= Rǫgnvaldr Guðrøðarson =

12th and 13th-century king in the British Isles

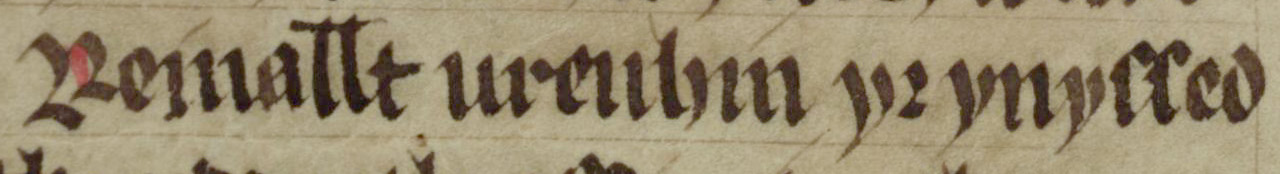
- Rǫgnvaldr's name and title as it appears on folio 154r of Oxford Jesus College 111 (the Red Book of Hergest): "Reinaỻt urenhin yr ynyssed".

King of the Isles
- Reign: 1187–1226
- Predecessor: Guðrøðr Óláfsson
- Successor: Óláfr Guðrøðarson
- Died: 14 February 1229; Tynwald
- Burial: St Mary's Abbey, Furness
- Issue: Guðrøðr Dond
- House: Crovan dynasty
- Father: Guðrøðr Óláfsson

Rǫgnvaldr Guðrøðarson (died 14 February 1229) ruled as King of the Isles from 1187 to 1226. He was the eldest son of Guðrøðr Óláfsson, King of Dublin and the Isles. (Note: Since the 1980s, academics have accorded Rǫgnvaldr various personal names in English secondary sources: Rachnald, Raghnall, Ragnald, Ragnall, Ragnvald, Ranald, Reginald, Reginaldus, Reinallt, Rhanallt, Rögnvald, Rognvald, Rögnvaldr, Rǫgnvald, Rǫgnvaldr, and Røgnvaldr. Likewise, academics have accorded Rǫgnvaldr various patronyms in such sources: Raghnall mac Godhfhraidh, Raghnall mac Gofhraidh, Raghnall mac Gofhraidh mhic Amhlaíbh Dheirg, Raghnall mac Gofraidh, Raghnall Ua Gofraidh an Mhearáin, Ragnaill mac Gofraidh, Ragnall Godredsson, Ragnall mac Gofraid, Ragnvald Godredsson, Reginald Godredsson, Rognvald Godredson, Rognvald Godredsson, Rognvald Guðrøðson, Rognvald Gudrodson, Rognvald Gudrødson, Rögnvald Guðrøðsson, Rognvald Gudrodsson, Rognvald Guðrøðsson, Rǫgnvaldr Guðrǫðarson, Rǫgnvaldr Guðrøðarson, Rögnvaldr Guðrøðarson, Rögnvaldr Guðrøðarsson, Rögnvaldr Guðrøðsson, and Rǫgnvald Guðrøðsson. Various forms of his name are recorded in Old Norse, Latin, Gaelic, and Welsh primary sources. It is unknown what form he would have felt most comfortable with, although one Latin charter of St Bees Priory renders his name "Ragdnaldus", an attempt at Latinising the Old Norse form of his name.) Although the latter may have intended for his younger son, Óláfr, to succeed to the kingship, the Islesmen chose Rǫgnvaldr, who was likely Óláfr's half-brother. Rǫgnvaldr went on to rule the Kingdom of the Isles for almost forty years before losing control to Óláfr.

The Crovan dynasty may have reached its zenith during Rǫgnvaldr's reign. Acclaimed in one near contemporary Scandinavian source as "the greatest warrior in the western lands", he lent military aid to William I, King of Scotland against the disaffected Haraldr Maddaðarson, Earl of Orkney and Caithness, and occupied Caithness for a short period of time at about the turn of the thirteenth century. Like his predecessors, Rǫgnvaldr was closely associated with the rulers of northern Wales. A daughter of his was betrothed to Rhodri ab Owain, a dynast of the ruling family of Gwynedd. In 1193, Rǫgnvaldr lent military aid to Rhodri against his rivals. Rǫgnvaldr was also involved in Irish affairs, as he was the brother-in-law of John de Courcy, one of the most powerful of the incoming Englishmen. With Courcy's eventual fall from power in the first decade of the thirteenth century, Rǫgnvaldr aided him in an unsuccessful attack on Courcy's rivals.

On numerous occasions from 1205 to 1219, Rǫgnvaldr bound himself to the English Crown by rendering homage to John, King of England and his successor, Henry III, King of England. In return for his vassalage, these English rulers promised to assist Rǫgnvaldr against any threats to his realm, whilst Rǫgnvaldr pledged to protect English interests in the Irish Sea zone. With the strengthening of Norwegian kingship in the first half of the century, the Norwegian Crown began to look towards the Isles, and in 1210 the region fell prey to a destructive military expedition. In consequence, Rǫgnvaldr rendered homage to Ingi Bárðarson, King of Norway. The resurgence of Norwegian authority threat may well have been the reason why Rǫgnvaldr submitted to Pope Honorius III in 1219, and promised to pay a perpetual tribute for the protection of his realm.

Óláfr's allotment in Rǫgnvaldr's island-kingdom appears to have been Lewis and Harris. When confronted by Óláfr for more territory, Rǫgnvaldr had him seized and incarcerated by the Scots. After almost seven years in captivity, Óláfr was released in 1214, and Rǫgnvaldr arranged for him to marry the sister of his own wife. Óláfr was able to have this marriage annulled, sometime after 1217, whereupon he married the daughter of a rising Scottish magnate. Outright warfare broke out between the half-brothers in the 1220s, and Óláfr's gains forced Rǫgnvaldr to turn to the powerful Alan fitz Roland, Lord of Galloway. Rǫgnvaldr and Alan bound themselves through the marriage of a daughter of Rǫgnvaldr to Alan's illegitimate son, Thomas. The prospect of a future Gallovidian king prompted the Manxmen to depose Rǫgnvaldr in favour of Óláfr. Although Rǫgnvaldr was initially aided against Óláfr by Alan and his family, Gallovidian military support dramatically diminished over time. On 14 February 1229, the forces of Rǫgnvaldr and Óláfr clashed for the last time, and Rǫgnvaldr himself was slain. His body was conveyed to St Mary's Abbey, Furness and buried.

== Sources ==
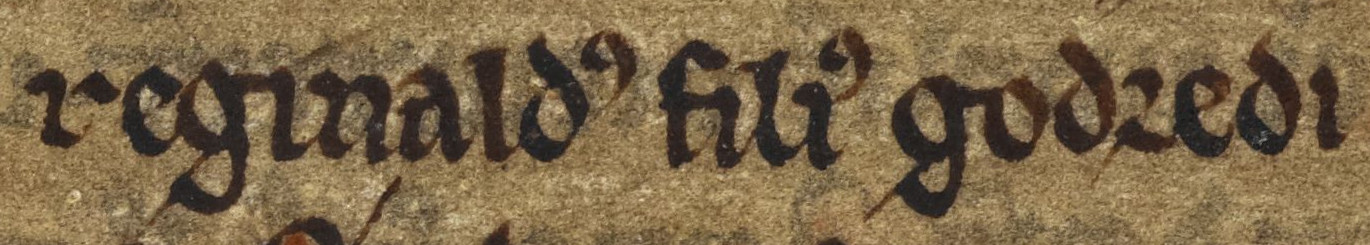
Rǫgnvaldr's name as it appears on folio 40v of British Library Cotton Julius A VII (the Chronicle of Mann): "Reginaldus filjus Godredi".

The main source for Rǫgnvaldr and his reign is the thirteenth- to fourteenth-century Chronicle of Mann, a historical account of the rulers of the Hebrides and Mann—the Crovan dynasty in particular—which survives in a Latin manuscript dating to the mid fourteenth century. Although the chronicle is the region's only contemporary indigenous narrative source, it is certainly not without its faults. Not only is its chronology suspect in parts, but it appears to be biased in favour of one branch of the dynasty over another—specifically the line of Rǫgnvaldr's rival half-brother over that of his own. Other important sources are royal acta of the dynasty. Of the twenty or so examples of such sources, six (all copies) were issued during Rǫgnvaldr's career. Numerous sources from outside the dynasty's domain—such as mediaeval chronicles and annals composed in England, Ireland, Scotland, Wales, and the Continent—also pertain to his life and times. Several Scandinavian sagas also provide useful information, although the historicity of such sources is debatable in certain circumstances. Also important is surviving correspondence between the dynasty and the English royal court, and the Vatican as well. In addition, certain Welsh genealogies, and a contemporary Irish praise-poem composed in Rǫgnvaldr's honour, also cast light upon Rǫgnvaldr's life and times. (Note: This anonymous poem, Baile suthach síth Emhna, is one of the earliest and most remarkable pieces of Gaelic praise-poetry, and one of the earliest Gaelic compositions to observe a strict dán díreach poetic metre. The poem evidences the multilingual nature of Rǫgnvaldr's court, and may reveal that Old Norse was to declining in the Isles. Its depiction of Rǫgnvaldr as a handsome young Viking, destined to become an Irish king, suggests that it was composed early in his career.)

== Antecedents and accession ==
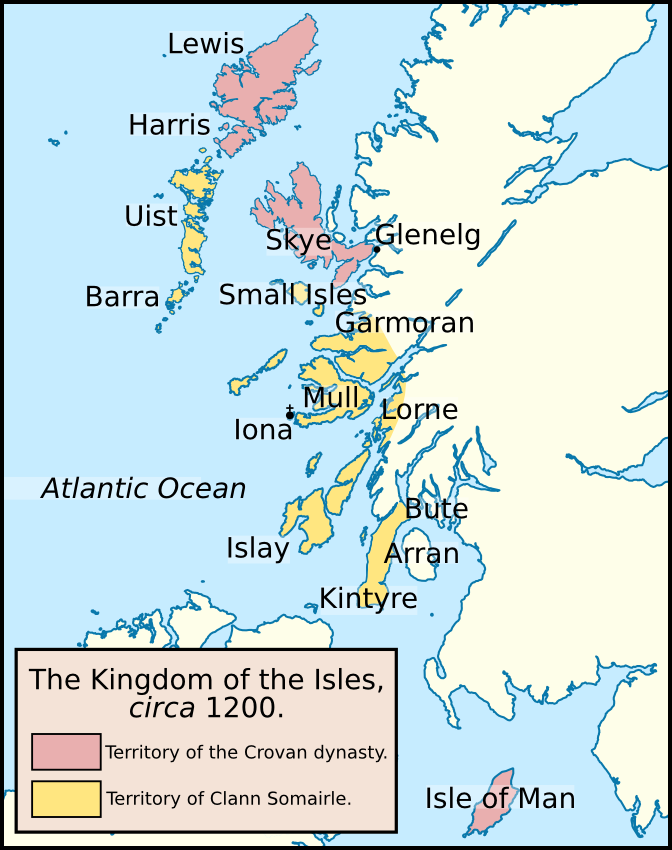
Map of the Kingdom of the Isles c.1200. The lands of the Crovan dynasty bordering those of the Meic Somairle.

Rǫgnvaldr was a son of Guðrøðr Óláfsson, King of Dublin and the Isles, and a member of the Crovan dynasty. (Note: The late mediaeval Welsh genealogical tract Achau Brenhinoedd a Thywysogion Cymru preserves a pedigree concerning Rǫgnvaldr himself. The pedigree runs: "Rhanallt m. Gwythryg ap Afloyd m. Gwrthryt Mearch m. Harallt Ddu m. Ifor Gamle m. Afloyd m. Swtrig". The "Gwrthryt Mearch" represents Guðrøðr Crovan, founder of the Crovan dynasty. The identities of the last four people in this pedigree are uncertain.) In the mid twelfth century, Guðrøðr Óláfsson inherited the kingship of the Isles, a region comprising the Hebrides and Mann. He soon faced internal opposition from his brother-in-law, Somairle mac Gilla Brigte, Lord of Argyll, who seized the Inner Hebridean portion of the kingdom in 1153. Three years later, Somairle seized the entire kingdom, and ruled the entirety of the Isles until his death in 1164. Although Guðrøðr Óláfsson regained the kingship, the territories lost to his brother-in-law in 1153 were retained by the latter's descendants, the Meic Somairle (or Clann Somairle).

Guðrøðr Óláfsson had one daughter and at least three sons: Affrica, Ívarr, Óláfr, and Rǫgnvaldr himself. (Note: There is evidence to suggest that Guðrøðr Óláfsson had another son named Ruaidrí.) Although nothing else is certain of Ívarr, Óláfr's mother appears to have been Findguala Nic Lochlainn, an Irishwoman whose marriage to Guðrøðr Óláfsson was formalised in 1176/1177, about the time of Óláfr's birth. When Guðrøðr Óláfsson died in 1187, the Chronicle of Mann claims that he left instructions for Óláfr to succeed to the kingship since the latter had been born "in lawful wedlock". Whether this is an accurate record of events is uncertain, as the Islesmen are stated to have chosen Rǫgnvaldr to rule instead, because unlike Óláfr, who was only a child at the time, Rǫgnvaldr was a hardy young man fully capable to reign as king.

Lavish, manly son of Gofraidh,
pleasant, noble son of Sadhbh.

— excerpt of Baile suthach síth Emhna outlining Rǫgnvaldr's parentage as a son of Guðrøðr and Sadb.

Although the chronicle seems to imply that Findguala was also Rǫgnvaldr's mother, at no point does the source state as much. In fact, there is evidence which strongly suggests that Rǫgnvaldr was the son of another woman. For example, the surviving fragments of a letter sent from Óláfr to Henry III, King of England in about 1228 reveal that Óláfr described Rǫgnvaldr as a bastard son of his father. Furthermore, the contemporary Gaelic praise-poem, Baile suthach síth Emhna, declares that he was a son of Sadb, an otherwise unknown Irishwoman who may have been an unrecorded wife or concubine of Guðrøðr. The likelihood that Rǫgnvaldr and Óláfr had different mothers may well explain the intense conflict between the two men in the years that followed. This continuing kin-strife is one of the main themes of Rǫgnvaldr's long reign.

Simplified family tree of Rǫgnvaldr illustrating degrees of kinship with the contemporary rulers of England, the Isles, Carrick, Galloway, Gwynedd, Kintyre, and Ulster. Rǫgnvaldr and the three Meic Somairle men who could have been the father of his wife are highlighted.

Henry I of England
Matilda	unknown	Fergus of Galloway	Guðrøðr; Crovan
Henry II of England	Gilla Brigte of Carrick	Uchtred of Galloway	Affraic	Óláfr of the Isles	unknown
John of England	Donnchad of Carrick	Roland of Galloway	Guðrøðr of the Isles	Ragnhildr	Somairle of the Isles
Henry III of England	Alan of Galloway	Thomas of Atholl	Rǫgnvaldr of the Isles	Óláfr of the Isles	Affrica	John de Courcy	Ragnall of Kintyre
Thomas	unknown	Guðrøðr Dond of the Isles	unknown	Rhodri of Gwynedd	Ruaidrí of Kintyre	Domnall

== Strained relations with Óláfr ==
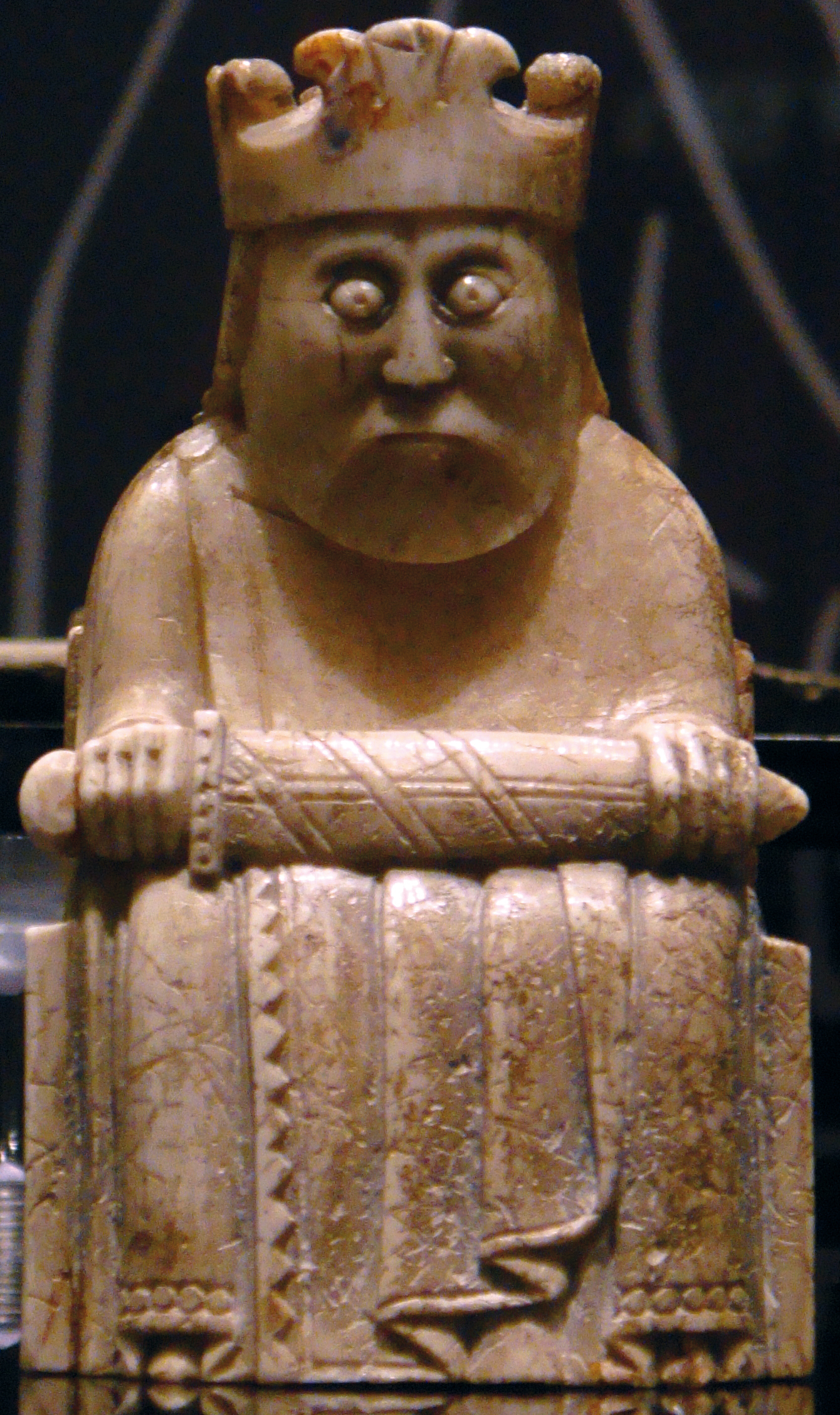
A king gaming piece of the Lewis chessmen. Comprising some four sets, the pieces are thought to have been crafted in Norway in the twelfth- and thirteenth centuries. They were uncovered in Lewis in the early nineteenth century.

According to the Chronicle of Mann, Rǫgnvaldr gave Óláfr possession of a certain island called "Lodhus". The chronicle disparagingly describes the island as being mountainous and rocky, completely unsuitable for cultivation, and declares that its small population lived mostly by hunting and fishing. In fact, Lewis is the northern part of the Outer Hebridean island of Lewis and Harris. Whilst the southern part—Harris—is somewhat mountainous, the northern part—Lewis—is rather flat and boggy. The chronicle, therefore, seems to have conflated the northern and southern parts of the island. In any case, the chronicle claims that, because of the impoverishment of his lands, Óláfr was unable to support himself and his followers, and that in consequence he led "a sorry life". The chronicle's otherwise perceptible prejudice against Rǫgnvaldr's branch of the Crovan dynasty, and its apparent bias in favour of Mann over the northernmost reaches of the realm, may also account for its denigrating depiction of Óláfr's allotted lands.

In consequence of this supposed poverty, the chronicle claims that Óláfr went to Rǫgnvaldr, who was also living in the Hebrides, and confronted him for more land. Rǫgnvaldr's stated response was to have Óláfr seized and sent to William I, King of Scotland, who kept him imprisoned for almost seven years. It may be more probable, however, that Rǫgnvaldr had taken action against Óláfr because the latter had approached the Norwegian Crown, and offered himself as a more palatable vassal-king in return for Norwegian support in deposing Rǫgnvaldr. In any case, the chronicle states that William died during the seventh year of Óláfr's captivity, and that William had ordered the release of all his political prisoners before his passing. Since William died in December 1214, Óláfr's incarceration appears to have spanned between about 1207 and 1214 or early 1215. Upon Óláfr's release, the chronicle reveals that the half-brothers met on Mann, after which Óláfr set off on a pilgrimage to Santiago de Compostela.

Excerpt from page 26 of Dublin Royal Irish Academy 23 E 29 (Baile suthach síth Emhna). This stanza about Rǫgnvaldr translates: "Thou hast inflicted a rout on Maelbheirn in defeat, and the fresh blows were as battle demons from thee; many the men in a glen prostrate in defeat from a bright slender blue-eyed noble battle-spirit".

At roughly this period, in 1209, the fifteenth- to sixteenth-century Annals of Ulster reports that the sons of Ragnall mac Somairle attacked Skye and slaughtered many of the Skyemen. It is unknown if this invasion of Rǫgnvaldr's realm was any way related to the slaying of Ragnall's brother, Áengus mac Somairle, and the latter's three sons, in the following year. What is certain, however, is that these, and other records concerning the Meic Somairle, reveal that the Crovan dynasty was not alone in introducing instability into the Isles. In fact, the elimination of Áengus and his sons appears to have had serious repercussions on not only the Meic Somairle succession, but Rǫgnvaldr's kingship in the Isles. (Note: There may be evidence of earlier conflict between the Meic Somairle and the Crovan dynasty. According to Hebridean tradition preserved by the seventeenth-century Sleat History, at one point during Ragnall's tenure his followers fought and slew a certain "Muchdanach", ruler of Moidart and Ardnamurchan, and thereby acquired the latter's lands. Muchdanach may be identical to a certain "Murcardus", a man described by the Chronicle of Mann as one whose "power and energy" were felt throughout the Kingdom of the Isles, and whose slaying is recorded in 1188, at about the time of Rǫgnvaldr's assumption of the kingship. The chronicle's brief account of Murcardus appears to reveal that he was a member of the kingdom's elite, but whether his killing was connected to Rǫgnvaldr's accession is unknown. If Muchdanach and Murcardus were indeed the same individual, the Sleat History would appear to preserve the memory of Meic Somairle intrusion into Garmoran, and the episode itself may be an example of feuding between the Meic Somairle and Crovan dynasty. Another source that may preserve evidence of conflict amongst the competing kindreds is Baile suthach síth Emhna. At one point, the poem declares that Rǫgnvaldr "brought a crushing defeat on Maelbheirn". If Maelbheirn represents a poetic term for Morvern, a region controlled by the Meic Somairle, it could indicate a battle was fought in the area. On the other hand, Maelbheirn may instead represent a personal name.)

== Relations with William of Scotland ==
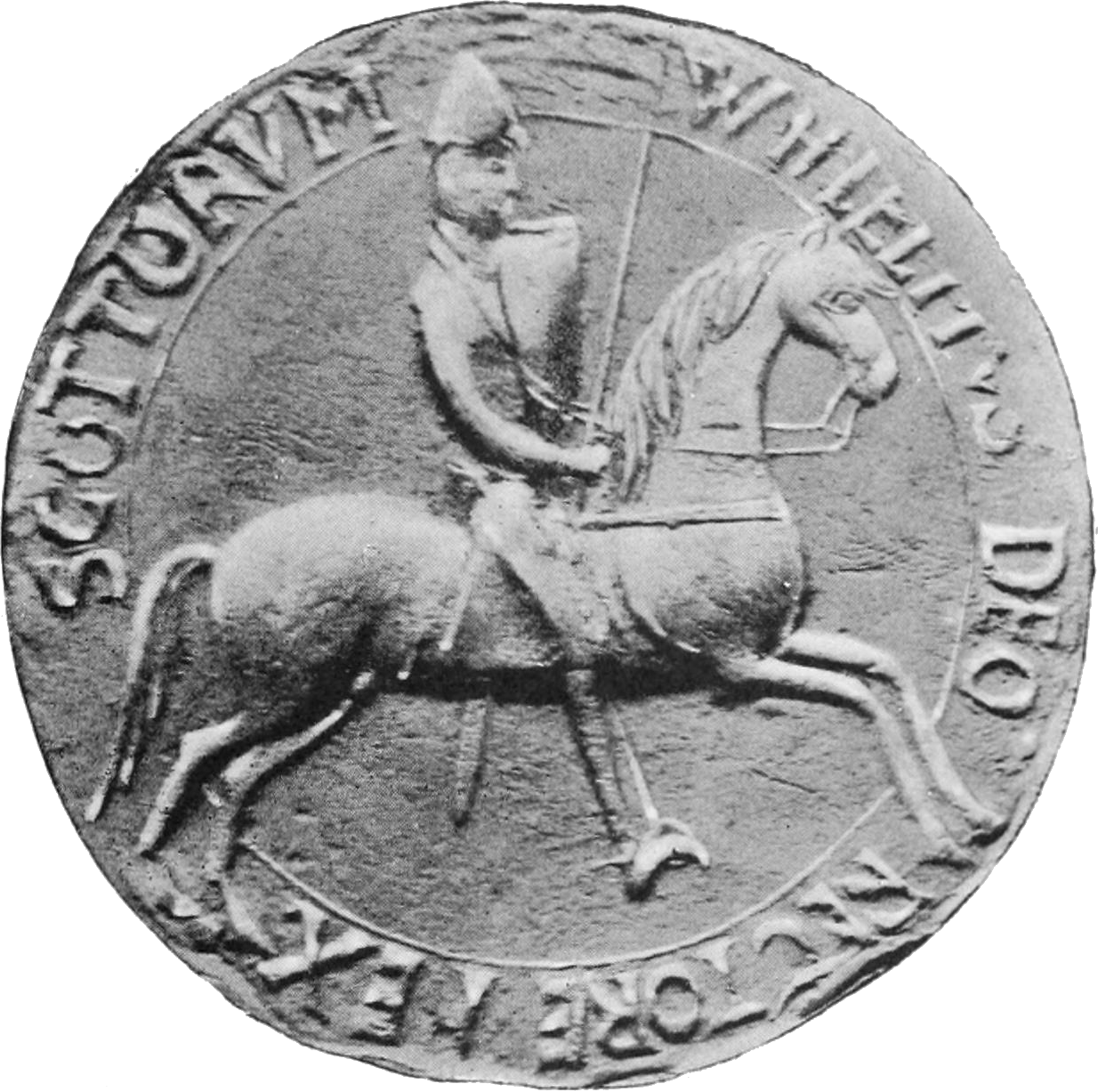
Seal of William I, King of Scotland.

There is earlier evidence of amicable relations between Rǫgnvaldr and William. The latter faced a series of revolts during his reign, with one particular problem being Haraldr Maddaðarson, Earl of Orkney and Caithness. At some point in the last half of the twelfth century, Haraldr Maddaðarson put aside his first wife, and married Hvarflǫð, described by the thirteenth-century Orkneyinga saga as the daughter of an Earl of Moray named Máel Coluim. It may well have been through Hvarflǫð that Haraldr Maddaðarson was drawn into conflict with the Scottish Crown. Whatever the case, a major continuing theme of Haraldr Maddaðarson's career was the constant assertion of Scottish and Norwegian royal authority into is domain, and his remarkable resistance to such interference.

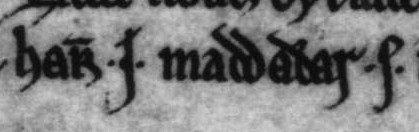
The name of Haraldr Maddaðarson, Earl of Orkney and Caithness as it appears on folio 56v of AM 47 fol (Eirspennill): "Haʀalldz I(arls) Maddaðar s(sonar)". Like Rǫgnvaldr, Haraldr Maddaðarson operated in a mixed Norse-Gaelic milieu, contending with Scottish and Norwegian kings alike.

In 1196, Haraldr Maddaðarson appears to have gained control of Moray. Although William was able to reassert authority in the north, and hand Caithness over to Haraldr Eiríksson, a more amiable applicant, Haraldr Maddaðarson managed to overcome the latter, and regained control of the earldom. It may have been at this point where Rǫgnvaldr entered the fray. According to Orkneyinga saga, once William learned that Haraldr Maddaðarson had taken control of Caithness, Rǫgnvaldr was tasked to intervene on behalf of the Scottish Crown. Having received the king's message, the saga records that Rǫgnvaldr gathered an armed host from the Isles, Kintyre, and Ireland, and went forth into Caithness, where he subdued the region. With the coming of winter, the saga records that Rǫgnvaldr returned to the Isles after having left three stewards in Caithness. When Haraldr Maddaðarson later had one of these stewards murdered, the saga states that William forced him into submission. The fact that Haraldr Maddaðarson only reasserted his authority action after Rǫgnvaldr's return to the Isles, coupled with the punishing fine that the former imposed upon the Caithnessmen once regaining control, suggests that Rǫgnvaldr had enjoyed support in the region.

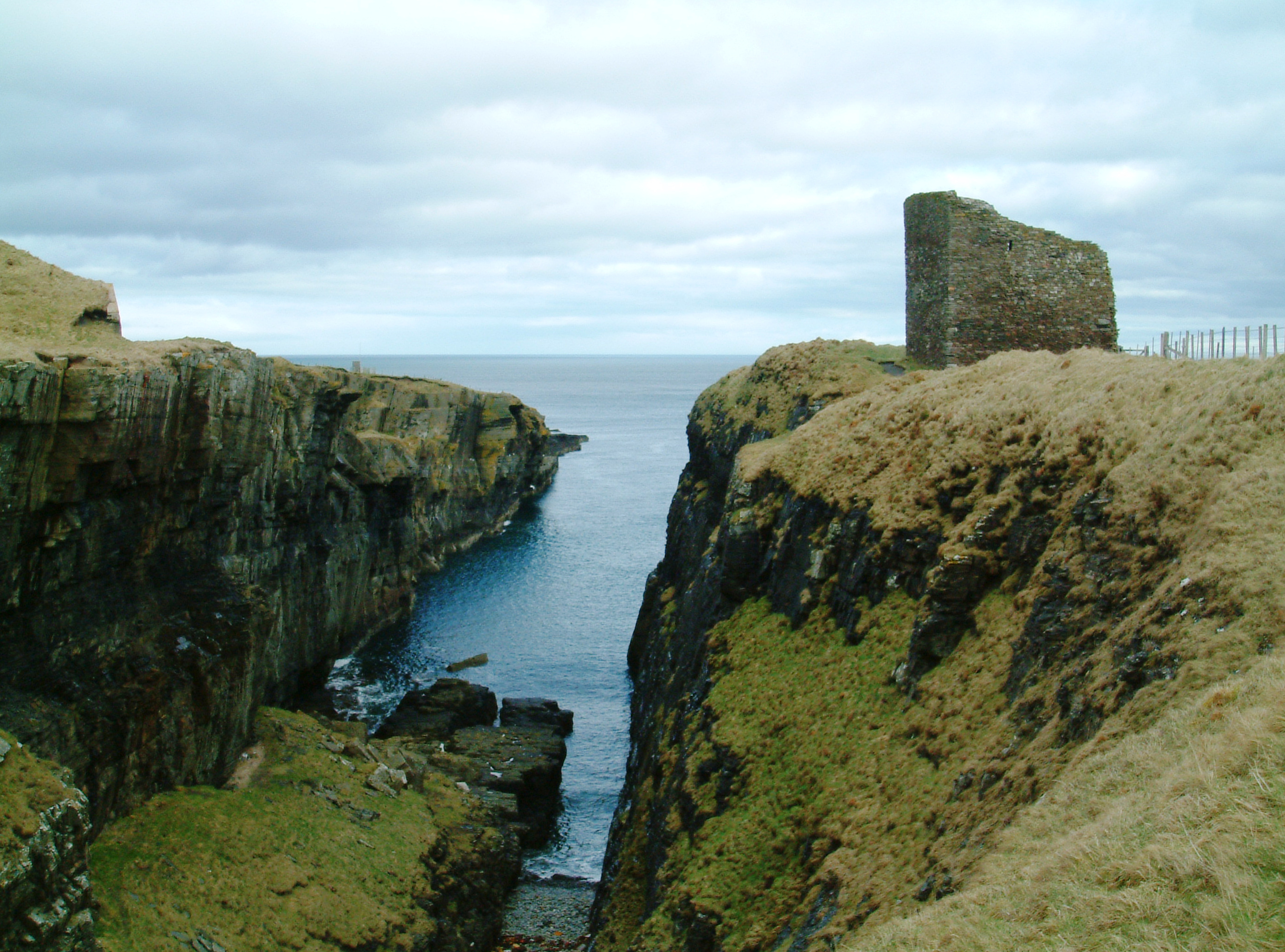
Ruinous Castle of Old Wick, a seemingly twelfth- or thirteenth-century fortress, was possibly the power centre of Haraldr Maddaðarson.

Rǫgnvaldr's involvement in Caithness is also noted by the contemporary English chronicler Roger de Hoveden. According to Roger's Chronica, after two rounds of negotiations between Haraldr Maddaðarson and William failed, Rǫgnvaldr intervened and bought Caithness from William. The precise date of Rǫgnvaldr's venture is uncertain, although it appears to have occurred in about 1200. Just prior to Rǫgnvaldr's involvement, Roger records that Haraldr Maddaðarson ventured into the Isles where he reinforced himself with an armed fleet, before returning to Orkney and Caithnes, and defeating Haraldr Eiríksson at Wick. If this part of Roger's account refers to military aid being received from Rǫgnvaldr's realm, the fact that Rǫgnvaldr and Haraldr Maddaðarson later became opponents would appear to reveal the fragility of certain of alliances. On the other hand, if Roger's account refers to the domain of the Meic Somairle, it could be evidence that Haraldr Maddaðarson was able to garner support from Rǫgnvaldr's rivals.

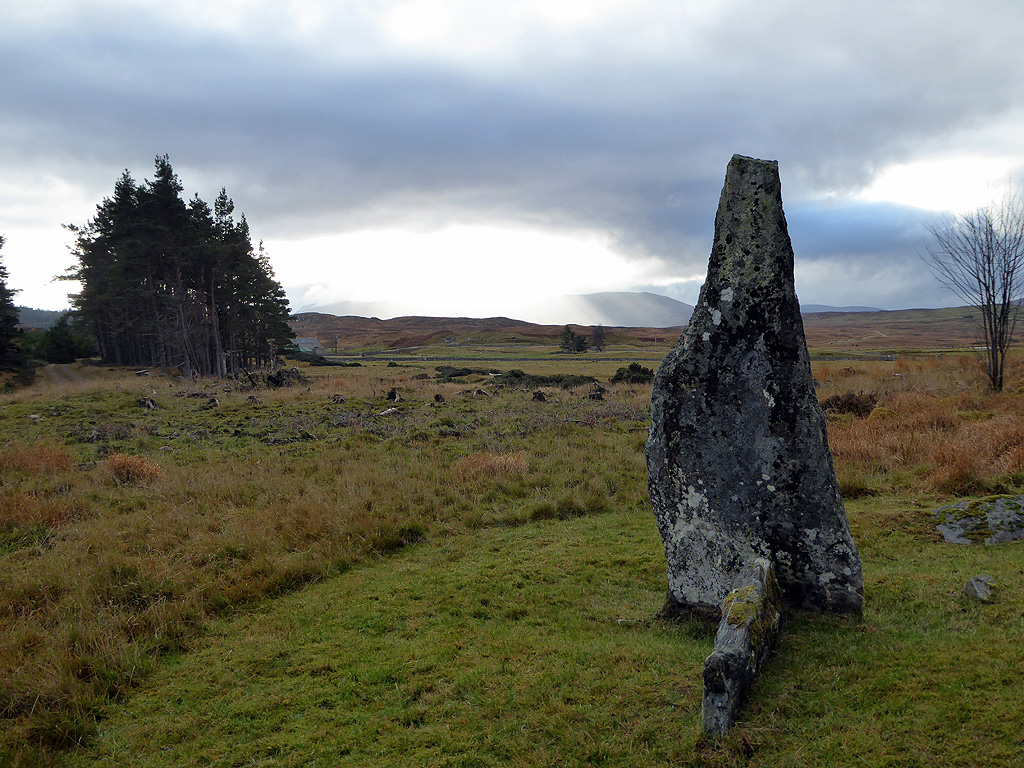
According to tradition, the stone circle Clach an Righ ("King's Stone"), near Syre, marks the site where Haraldr Maddaðarson was defeated by Rǫgnvaldr.

Although not descended from previous Orcadian earls, Rǫgnvaldr could perhaps be considered related to these Norwegian magnates by right of his paternal grandfather's marriage to Ingibjǫrg, daughter of Hákon Pálsson, Earl of Orkney. If this was indeed the case, William's act of using Rǫgnvaldr in Caithness may have been an example of the king playing one member of the jarlsaetten against another. The jarlsaetten were people who possessed a claim to an earldom, in accordance with Norse custom, by right of their descent from previous earls. In fact, William made use of the jarlsaetten when he had earlier granted Caithness to Haraldr Eiríksson, a grandson of Rǫgnvaldr Kali Kolsson, Earl of Orkney. On the other hand, the fact that Rǫgnvaldr possessed no known blood relationship with the earls could conversely be evidence that he was the first Scottish-backed ruler of Caithness without a personal connection to the Orcadian jarlsaetten. In any event, although it is not impossible that Rǫgnvaldr ruled as Earl of Caithness for a short time, surviving evidence does not record his installation as such, and only demonstrates that he was appointed to administrate the province.

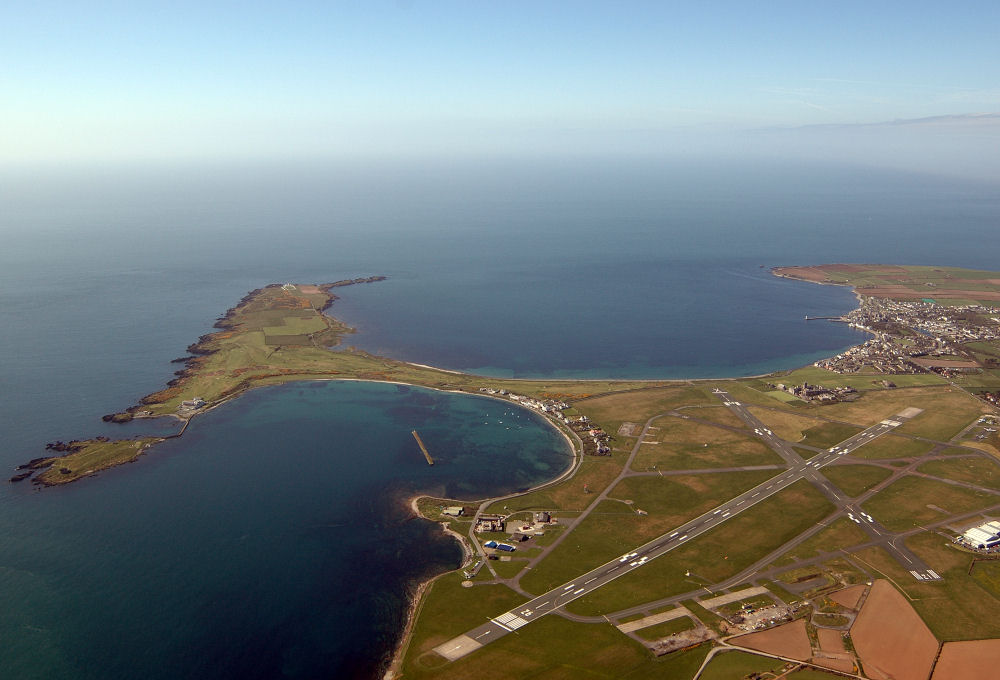
The Isle of Man Airport encompasses a site once called Ronaldsway. Rǫgnvaldr may well be the eponym of this place name.

Rǫgnvaldr's participation in league with the Scottish Crown could have stemmed from his kinship with the Constable of Scotland, Roland fitz Uhtred, Lord of Galloway, or perhaps resulted from a shared enmity towards the Meic Somairle. There is much confusion surrounding two twelfth-century magnates named Máel Coluim. One was Máel Coluim mac Áeda, Earl of Ross, whilst the other was Máel Coluim mac Alasdair, an illegitimate son of Alexander I, King of Scotland. The latter Máel Coluim attempted to seize the Scottish throne earlier in the twelfth century, and appears to have been related in marriage to Somairle's family. If Hvarflǫð's father was this Máel Coluim, it could explain an alliance between Haraldr Maddaðarson and the Meic Somairle. Such an alliance with Rǫgnvaldr's rivals could also explain the Scottish Crown's use of him against Haraldr Maddaðarson.

== Welsh connections ==
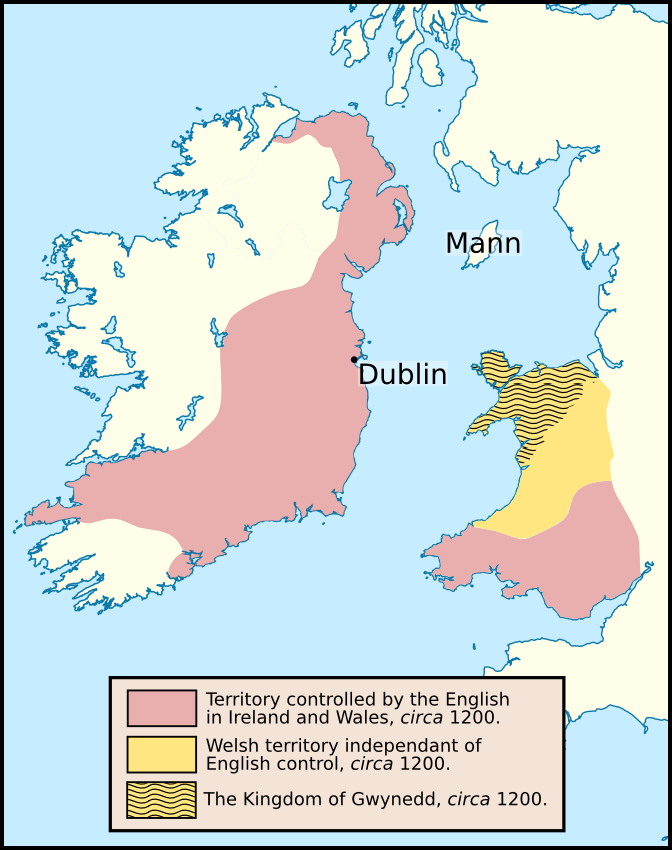
The Kingdom of Gwynedd, and the extent of English dominance in Ireland and Wales, c.1200.

From its earliest years, the Crovan dynasty forged alliances with the northern Welsh rulers of the Kingdom of Gwynedd. Some of the earliest evidence of Rǫgnvaldr's kingship concerns his involvement in northern Wales. During the late twelfth century, the region was wracked by vicious interdynastic warring. In 1190, one of Gruffudd's grandsons, Rhodri ab Owain Gwynedd, was ejected from Anglesey apparently by the sons of his own brother, Cynan ab Owain Gwynedd. The thirteenth- and fourteenth-century texts Brenhinedd y Saesson and Brut y Tywysogyon reveal that Rǫgnvaldr militarily supported Rhodri in his successful re-acquisition of Anglesey three years later. Another mediaeval Welsh text, the fourteenth-century O Oes Gwrtheyrn Gwrtheneu, refers to the year 1193 as haf y Gwyddyl ("the summer of the Gaels"), which could further evince the participation of Rǫgnvaldr and his troops.

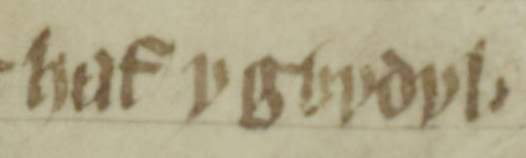
Excerpt from folio 254r of Oxford Jesus College 111: "haf y gỽydyl". This "summer of the Gaels" seems to refer the presence of Rǫgnvaldr's troops in Wales.

Rǫgnvaldr and Rhodri were also bound together by a marital alliance, as a papal letter, dated November 1199, indicates that a daughter of Rǫgnvaldr was betrothed to Rhodri. Although the precise date of the marriage is unknown, Rǫgnvaldr's military support of Rhodri in 1193 was almost certainly related to it. Rhodri died in 1195, and the same papal letter indicates that his widow was arranged to marry his nephew, Llywelyn ap Iorwerth, Prince of Gwynedd. The arrangement appears to have taken place in the context of Llywelyn's consolidation in Gwynedd. Like his uncle, Llywelyn appears to have intended to establish an alliance with the Islesmen in order strengthen his position in Wales. Although the arrangement may well evidence Rǫgnvaldr's power and influence in the region, Llywelyn clearly extricated himself from the arrangement in order to bind himself in marriage to a much stronger and more influential superpower, the English Crown. Although certain correspondence with the papacy reveals that the marriage between Llywelyn and Rǫgnvaldr's daughter had received papal approval in April 1203, another letter shows that the ratification was reversed on a technicality in February 1205. (Note: This papal letter states that evidence had been brought forth indicating that Rhodri's marriage had been consummated, whereas correspondence had maintained that the marriage was unconsummated. The letter further reveals that the girl's attendants, relatives, as well as the Bishop of the Isles, insisted in vain that her marriage to Rhodri had been unconsummated.) This ruling was clearly one of convenience for Llywelyn, as the latter was by this time married to Joan, an illegitimate daughter of John, King of England. (Note: Contemporary English records reveal that Llywelyn and Joan's betrothal took place in 1204. In 1226, Pope Honorius III declared Joan legitimate.) This may have been about the time when Rǫgnvaldr himself first entered into what would be an enduring relationship with the English Crown.

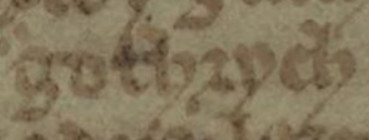
Rǫgnvaldr's father's name as it appears on page 198 of National Library of Wales Peniarth 20 (Brut y Tywysogyon): "Gothrych".

There may be further evidence of Rǫgnvaldr's Welsh connections. According to several non-contemporary Welsh genealogical tracts, the mother of Llywelyn ap Gruffudd, Prince of Wales was an otherwise unknown daughter of Rǫgnvaldr named Rhanullt. (Note: The personal name Rhanullt corresponds to the Old Norse Ragnhildr.) If correct, these sources could indicate that Llywelyn's father, Gruffydd ap Llywelyn Fawr married a daughter of Rǫgnvaldr in about 1220. Contemporary sources, however, show that Llywelyn's mother was Senana, an undoubted wife of Gruffydd. In yet another Welsh pedigree—one compiled by the herald and poet Lewys Dwnn—Rǫgnvaldr is stated have had an otherwise unknown son named Hywel. (Note: The pedigree runs: "Mam John ap Llewelyn, Elen v̄ Ffylib ap David ap Ierwerth ap Rȳs ap Mredydd ap Howel ap Reinallt vab brenin Manaw ne brenin y Gogledd".) Although the reliability of such late genealogical sources is suspect, Rǫgnvaldr's known dealings with leading Welsh dynasts could lend weight to the possibility that he had an otherwise unknown Welsh wife or concubine.

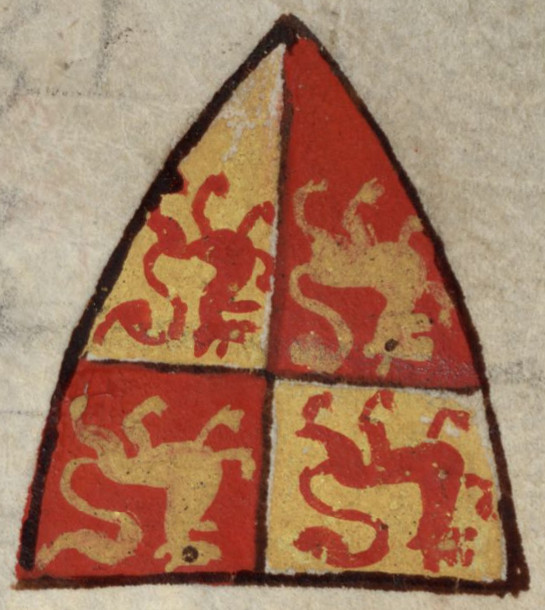
Coat of arms of Gruffydd ap Llywelyn Fawr as it appears on folio 170r of Cambridge Corpus Christi College 16 II (Chronica majora).

Rǫgnvaldr was also responsible for the Welsh translation of mediaeval texts dealing with Charlemagne and Roland. There are ten surviving manuscripts, dating no later than the seventeenth century, which preserve the thirteenth-century Cân Rolant, the Welsh version of La chanson de Roland. Along with the Welsh versions of the twelfth-century texts Historia Karoli Magni et Rotholandi and Le Pèlerinage de Charlemagne, Cân Rolant comprises part of the Welsh Charlemagne cycle. All but one of the ten manuscripts contain a colophon revealing that Rǫgnvaldr was the impetus behind the original translation. (Note: An excerpt of the colophon in National Library of Wales Peniarth 10 reads: "Hyt hynn y traetha yr Istoria a beris Reinallt vrenhin yr ynyssoed y athro idaw ythrossi ae hymchwelut o rwmawns yn lladin o weithredoed chiarlymaen nyt amgen oe amrysson ar ỽrenhines. ac yd aeth gaerussalem. ac oe gyurageu a hu gadarn. yr hynn nyt ymyrrawd turpin y draethu onadunt". This excerpt translates: "Thus far is related the History of Charlemagne's deeds which Reinallt King of the Isles had his clerk translate and turn from Romance into Latin, namely his quarrel with the Queen and his journey to Jerusalem and his conversion with Hugh the Mighty, which Turpin did not bother to relate".) The work appears to have taken place at some point after his accession, and possibly following the marriage of his daughter to Rhodri. The catalyst for the translations is uncertain. During the reign of his contemporary, Hákon Hákonarson, King of Norway, many Anglo-Norman manuscripts were translated into Old Norse, including those that became the thirteenth-century Karlamagnús saga. Historia Karoli Magni et Rotholandi and Le Pèlerinage de Charlemagne appear to have been known in Scandinavia by the twelfth century, and it is possible that Rǫgnvaldr became familiar with them whilst in Norway, leading him to commission a translation of his own. On the other hand, he could have also become familiar with the tales whilst in England. Rǫgnvaldr's familial links with the Welsh, and perhaps Cistercian connections between Mann and Wales, may account for his part in the translations into Welsh. The work itself was seemingly carried out at the Ceredigion monastery of Llanbadarn Fawr, once a centre of Welsh scholarship.

== Involvement in Ireland ==
Offspring of fleet-rich Lochlann,
offspring of bright Conn of the chains,
you'll seek a harbour behind Aran
while probing Ireland's cold shores.

— excerpt of Baile suthach síth Emhna; one of several parts associating Rǫgnvaldr with Ireland. (Note: "Lochlann" seems to represent Scandinavia, although it is not impossible that it instead refers to the Meic Lochlainn. "Conn of the chains" represents the legendary Irish king Conn Cétchathach. "Aran" appears to represent the Aran Islands off western Ireland, although another possibility may be Arran in the Firth of Clyde. One possibility is that the poem's declarations of descent from Lochlann, Conn, and Cormac refer to figures of the Uí Néill. This could mean that Rǫgnvaldr's mother was a member of the Uí Néill, and that her union with his father was undertaken in the context of an alliance with Muirchertach Mac Lochlainn, King of Cenél nEógain.)

Although Rǫgnvaldr is not mentioned in the Irish annals, other historical sources indicate that he indeed had Irish connections. For example, Orkneyinga saga notes that, when he lent military support to William in Caithness, Rǫgnvaldr led a large army drawn from Ireland. Also linking Rǫgnvaldr to Ireland is Henry III's summons to Rǫgnvaldr, dated 16 January 1218, commanding him to explain the "excesses committed upon the people of our Lord the King, as well in England as in Ireland". Baile suthach síth Emhna also reveals connections with the island. Although the poem undoubtedly exaggerates Rǫgnvaldr's feats, its claims of devastating raids into Ireland may not be complete fantasy, as evidenced by the summons.

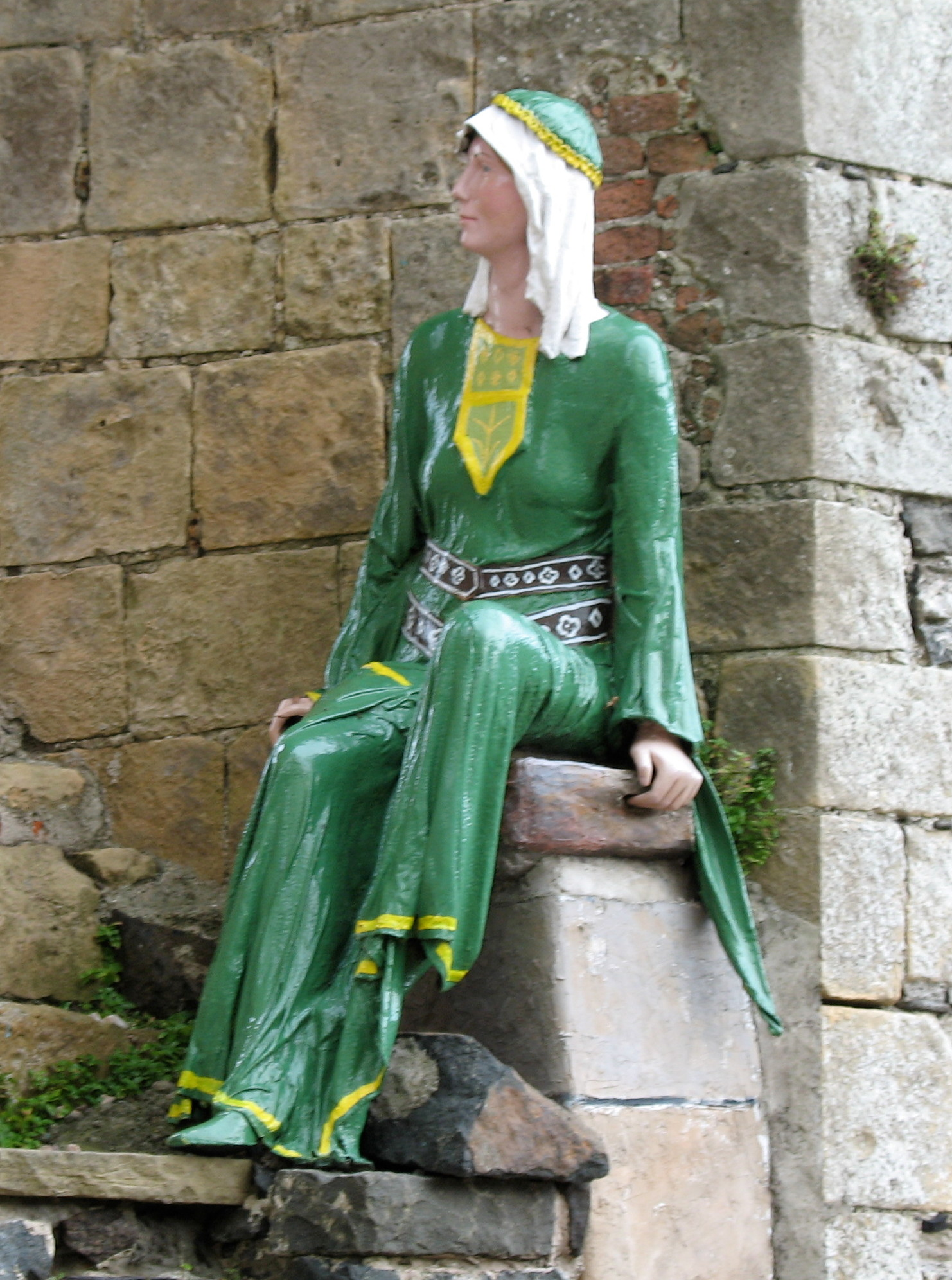
Mannequin of Rǫgnvaldr's sister, Affrica, at Carrickfergus Castle. The mannequin is looking through the window of the castle's great hall.

The poem also alludes to Rǫgnvaldr's right to the kingship of Tara, and appears to evince the prospect of seizing power in Dublin. Rǫgnvaldr's antecessors were certainly closely associated with the Norse-Gaelic Kingdom of Dublin. However, with the kingdom's collapse at the hands of English adventurers in 1170, and the ongoing entrenchment of the English throughout Ireland itself, the Crovan dynasty found itself surrounded by this threatening, rising new power in the Irish Sea zone. Despite the dynasty's original opposition to the English in Dublin, it did not take long to realign itself with this new power, as exemplified through a marital alliance between Rǫgnvaldr's sister, Affrica, and one of the most powerful incoming Englishmen, John de Courcy.

In 1177, Courcy led an invasion of Ulaid (an area roughly encompassing what is today County Antrim and County Down). He reached Down (modern day Downpatrick), drove off Ruaidrí Mac Duinn Sléibe, King of Ulaid, consolidated his conquest, and ruled his lands with a certain amount of independence for about a quarter of a century. Although the date of the marriage between Courcy and Affrica is uncertain, the union may well have attributed to his stunning successes in Ireland. The rulers of Ulaid and those of Mann had a bitter past-history between them, and it is possible that Courcy's marital alliance with the Crovan dynasty was the catalyst of his assault upon the Ulaid. In fact, Guðrøðr Óláfsson formalised his marriage to Findguala in 1176/1177, and thereby bound his dynasty with the Meic Lochlainn of Cenél nEógain, another traditional foe of the Ulaid. Courcy would have almost certainly attempted to use such alignments to his advantage, whilst Guðrøðr Óláfsson would have used Courcy's campaigning against the Ulaid as a means of settling old scores.

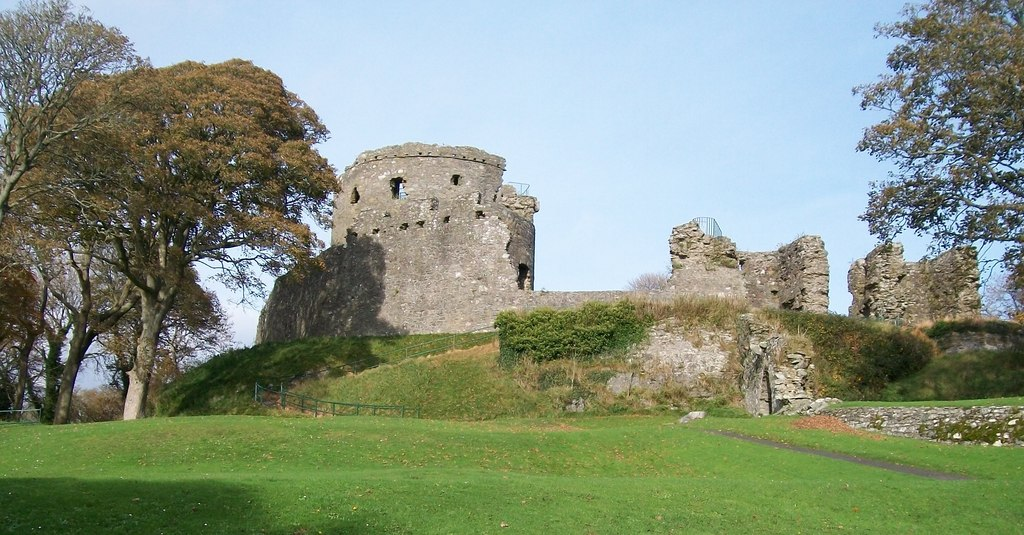
Ruinous late twelfth-century inner curtain wall, and early thirteenth-century keep of Dundrum Castle. Rǫgnvaldr's forces assisted those of Courcy against the castle in 1205.

Courcy's fall from power occurred in a series of conflicts with the English Crown between 1201 and 1204. By 1205 he was forced from Ireland altogether, and his lands were awarded to Hugh de Lacy. During Courcy's subsequent revolt within the year, he received military support from Rǫgnvaldr, his brother-in-law. The Chronicle of Mann specifies that Courcy's massive force was reinforced by Rǫgnvaldr with one hundred ships, and states that they laid siege to a certain castle of "Roth", before being beaten back with the arrival of Walter de Lacy. (Note: Although it is uncertain if this number is an accurate sum of Rǫgnvaldr's ships, if the total is even remotely accurate it would appear to represent a very large proportion of his royal fleet. The numbers could be evidence that Rǫgnvaldr's forces numbered between four thousand and six thousand men.) The expedition is also recorded by the sixteenth-century Annals of Loch Cé, which states that Courcy brought a fleet from the Isles to battle the Lacys. Although the expedition ultimately proved a failure, the source indicates that the surrounding countryside was plundered and destroyed by the invaders. The identity of the castle named by the chronicle is almost certainly Dundrum Castle, which was possibly constructed by Courcy before 1203. The defeat of 1205 marks the downfall of Courcy, who never regained his Irish lands.

== Relations with John of England ==
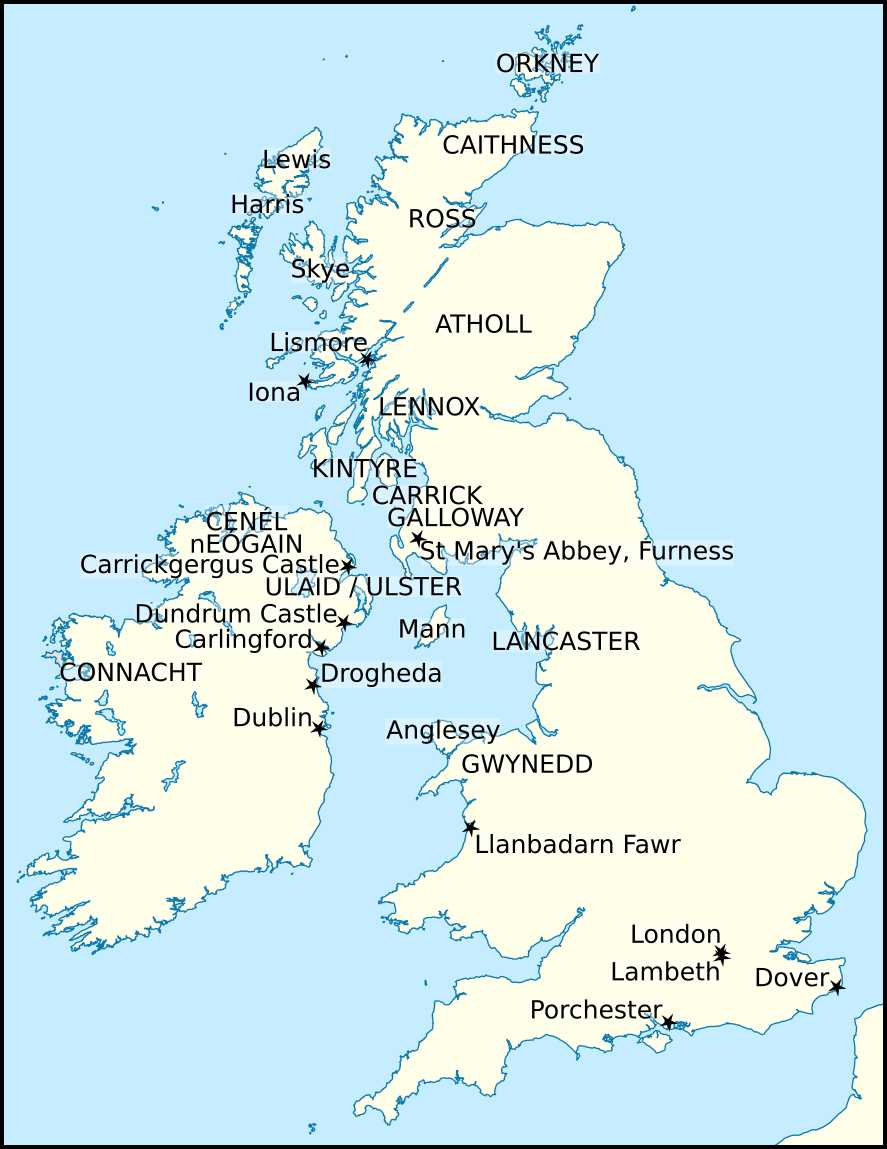
Locations in Britain and Ireland relating to the life and times of Rǫgnvaldr.

Rǫgnvaldr's involvement in Ireland, and his connection with Courcy, may have led to contact with the English kings John and Henry III. In fact, Courcy's final downfall may have been somewhat of a relief to Rǫgnvaldr, since it meant that he was no longer caught between conflicting loyalties he would owe to both the English Crown and brother-in-law. On 8 February 1205, the year of the attack on Dundrum, John took Rǫgnvaldr under his protection. Exactly a year later, John issued Rǫgnvaldr safe conduct for fifteen days to come to England for Easter (22 April 1206). A further record dated 28 April reveals that Rǫgnvaldr rendered homage to John during this Easter sojourn, and states that the latter ordered the Sheriff of Lancaster to assign thirty marcates of land to Rǫgnvaldr. (Note: A marcate is a piece of land worth one mark of gold or silver yearly.) Accordingly, the Lancashire Pipe Rolls reveal that the sheriff associated twenty librates of land with Rǫgnvaldr during the year spanning Michaelmas 1205 and Michaelmas 1206. (Note: A librate is a piece of land worth a pound a year.) Since the rolls do not name any estate associated with Rǫgnvaldr, he does not appear to have been assigned any lands, but rather a charge upon the ferm of the county. On 29 April, John ordered his treasurer to pay thirty marks to Rǫgnvaldr. About a year later, on 17 June 1207, John ordered the sheriff to assign Rǫgnvaldr with twenty liberates of land, a payment which is also confirmed by the Lancashire Pipe Rolls.

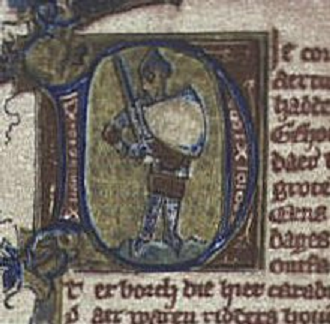
Fourteenth-century depiction of Fergus, Lord of Galloway as he is depicted in Leiden University Library Letterkunde 191 (Roman van Ferguut). Fergus was a grandfather of Donnchad mac Gilla Brigte, and a great-grandfather of Alan fitz Roland, Thomas fitz Roland, and Rǫgnvaldr himself. Donnchad, the FitzRolands, and Rǫgnvaldr were important agents of the English Crown in Ireland.

Rǫgnvaldr's increasing interaction with the English Crown after Courcy's fall suggests that the English king not only orchestrated Courcy's undoing, but purposely detached Rǫgnvaldr from the latter. Such an act not only considerably weakened Courcy, but lessened the chance of a Lacy counterstroke against Rǫgnvaldr that could potentially destabilise the Irish Sea region. In fact, the collapse of Rǫgnvaldr's marital alliance with Llywelyn ap Iorwerth took place at about the same time, and it is possible that this breakup was masterminded by the English as well.

In 1210, the Chronicle of Mann reports that John led five hundred ships to Ireland. Whilst Rǫgnvaldr and his men were absent from Mann, part of John's forces are recorded to have landed and ravaged it for a fortnight before departing with hostages. There does not appear to be any other evidence of possibly poor relations between Rǫgnvaldr and John at this time. Since the men were clearly on friendly terms between 1205 and 1207, John's assault on the island does not appear to be connected to Rǫgnvaldr's earlier campaigning with (the then-disgraced) Courcy. Instead, it is likely that the devastation was related to John's souring relations with the Lacy and the Briouze families. In 1208, William de Briouze, with his wife and family, fled from John to Ireland, where they were harboured by the Lacys. When John arrived in Ireland in 1210, the Briouzes fled towards Scotland, and were apprehended in Galloway by Courcy's close associate and Rǫgnvaldr's kinsman Donnchad mac Gilla Brigte, Earl of Carrick.

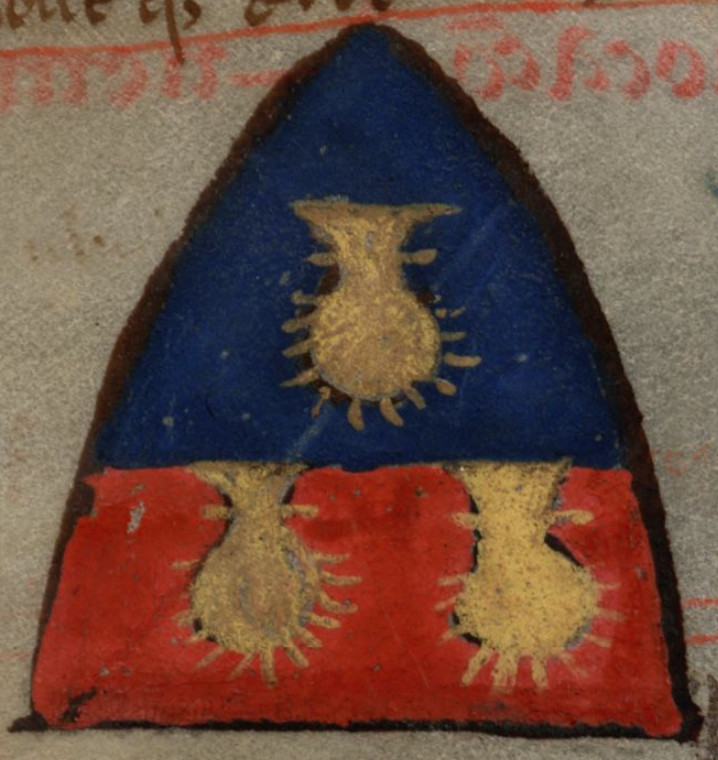
Coat of arms of William de Briouze as it appears on folio 33v of Cambridge Corpus Christi College 16 II.

A link between the flight of the Briouzes and Rǫgnvaldr appears in the thirteenth-century Histoire des ducs de Normandie et des rois d'Angleterre, which states that, whilst en route to Scotland just before their capture, the Briouzes stayed on Mann for four days. Although it is impossible to know for certain whether Rǫgnvaldr sanctioned the arrival of the fleeing Briouzes, their close connection with the Lacys, and Rǫgnvaldr's close connection with Courcy—a man who had been forced from his Irish lands by the Lacys—both strongly suggest that cooperation between Rǫgnvaldr and Briouze is unlikely. In any case, the English depredations on Mann are corroborated by other sources, such as the Annals of Loch Cé, and the continuation of twelfth-century Historia rerum Anglicarum, In his own account of events, John declared that he had learned of the capture of Briouze's wife and children whilst at Carrickfergus, a statement which may hint that the attack on Mann was punitive in nature. (Note: Another seemingly relevant source revealing English involvement on the island within the year is the administrative record of the English Crown's payment for the protection of an English supply on Mann.)

If the attack was indeed a case of retaliation it may not have been due to Rǫgnvaldr's own involvement with enemies of the English Crown. The fleeing Briouzes were also accompanied by Hugh himself, but unlike them he managed to elude capture, and was temporarily harboured in Scotland by Ailín II, Earl of Lennox. The Lacys' previous connections with Dublin and Ulster suggest that Hugh may have had supporters on Mann. In fact, his stay-over in Rǫgnvaldr's absence may have been enabled due to the fraternal discord between Rǫgnvaldr and Óláfr. A correlation between the Lacys and the struggle between Óláfr and Rǫgnvaldr may be exemplified by a 1217 royal order directed at Hugh's half-brother, William Gorm de Lacy, commanding him to restore Carlingford Castle, and repay the damages which he had caused in capturing it. The fact that Rǫgnvaldr received restoration of his nearby knight's fee in 1219 could indicate that these lands had also been overrun and seized by the Lacys.

== Divided loyalties: England and Norway ==
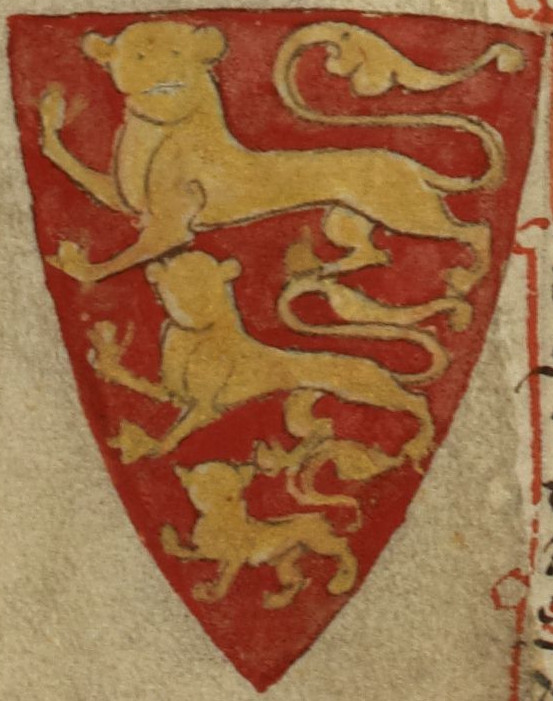
Coat of arms of Henry III, King of England as it appears on folio 100r of British Library Royal 14 C VII (Historia Anglorum).

In the years between the death of Magnús Óláfsson, King of Norway and the reign of Hákon, Norwegian power in the Isles was negligible due to an ongoing civil war in Norway. In the mid twelfth century, however, during his visit to Norway, Rǫgnvaldr's father appears to have become a vassal of Ingi Haraldsson, King of Norway. Certainly the twelfth-century Norman chronicler Robert de Torigni, Abbot of Mont Saint-Michel reported a mid-century meeting between Henry II, King of England, William, and the Bishop of the Isles, where it was stated that the kings of the Isles were obliged to pay the kings of Norway ten marks of gold upon the latter's accession.

Whilst bound to the English Crown in 1210, Rǫgnvaldr appears to have found himself the target of renewed Norwegian hegemony in the Isles. Specifically, the Icelandic annals reveal that a military expedition from Norway to the Isles was in preparation in 1209. The following year, the same source notes "warfare" in the Isles, and reveals that Iona was pillaged. These reports are corroborated by Bǫglunga sǫgur, a thirteenth-century saga-collection that survives in two versions. Both versions reveal that a fleet of Norwegians plundered in the Isles, and the shorter version notes how men of the Birkibeinar and the Baglar—two competing sides of the Norwegian civil war—decided to recoup their financial losses with a twelve-ship raiding expedition into the Isles. The longer version states that "Ragnwald" (styled "Konge aff Möen i Syderö") and "Gudroder" (styled "Konge paa Manö") had not paid their taxes due to the Norwegian kings. In consequence, the source records that the Isles were ravaged until the two travelled to Norway and reconciled themselves with Ingi Bárðarson, King of Norway, whereupon the two took their lands from Ingi as a lén (fief).

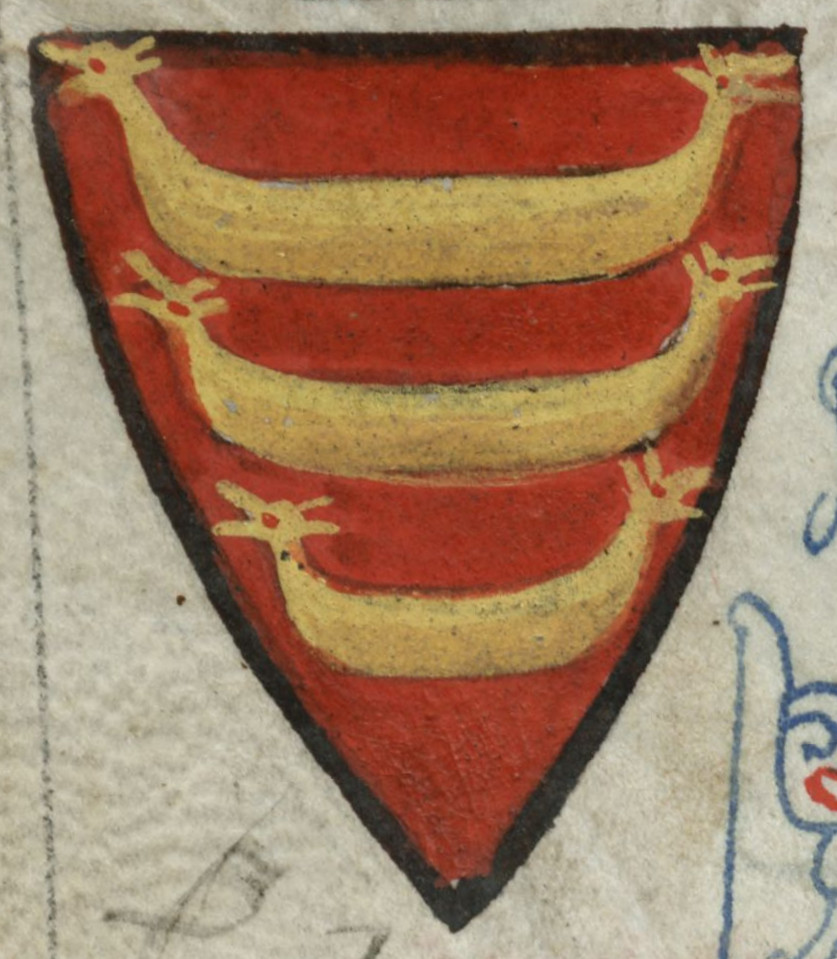
Coat of arms of Hákon Hákonarson as it appears on folio 217v of Cambridge Corpus Christi College 16 II.

The two submitting monarchs of Bǫglunga sǫgur probably represent Rǫgnvaldr and his son, Guðrøðr Dond. (Note: It is not impossible, however, that the named kings instead refer to Ragnall and Rǫgnvaldr. This identification rests on the fact that Ragnall and Rǫgnvaldr bore the same personal names—the Gaelic Ragnall is an equivalent of the Old Norse Rǫgnvaldr—coupled with the possibility that the source's "Gudroder" is the result of confusion regarding Rǫgnvaldr's patronym.) The skattr (tax) that Rǫgnvaldr and his son rendered to Ingi appears to be the same tribute that Robert noted in his account. The submission of the Islesmen appears to have been undertaken in the context of the strengthening position of the Norwegian Crown following the settlement between the Birkibeinar and Baglar, and the simultaneous weakening of the Crovan dynasty due to internal infighting. The destructive Norwegian activity in the Isles may have been some sort of officially sanctioned punishment from Norway due to Rǫgnvaldr's recalcitrance in terms of, not only his Norwegian obligations, but his recent reorientation towards the English Crown. The fact that Ingi turned his attention to the Isles so soon after peace was brokered in Norway may well indicate the importance that he placed on his relations with Rǫgnvaldr and his contemporaries in the Isles.

Rǫgnvaldr may have also used his journey as a means to safeguard the kingship against the claims of Óláfr. His presence there may explain his absence from Mann during the ravaging of the island by the English. In fact, Rǫgnvaldr's submission to Ingi could have been contributed to the English attack, as it may have given the English an incentive to devastate Rǫgnvaldr's lands because he had bound himself to John only a few years previous. Although John had originally installed Hugh as Earl of Ulster, he proceeded to dismantle the lordship after Hugh gave refuge to the Briouzes. The ravaging of Mann, therefore, may have been a further demonstration of English royal power directed at a disloyal vassal. If this was indeed the case, Rǫgnvaldr's submission to the Norwegian Crown—although apparently undertaken to safeguard his kingdom—clearly resulted in severe repercussions.

== Enduring links with England ==
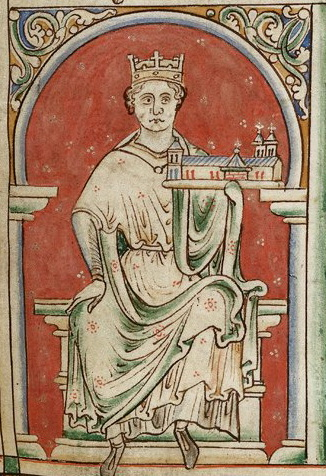
Thirteenth-century depiction of John, King of England as he appears on folio 9r of British Library Royal 14 C VII.

Numerous sources reveal that, in the years following the ravaging of Mann and plundering of the Isles, Rǫgnvaldr bound himself closer to the English Crown. Whilst at Lambeth on 16 May 1212, for instance, during what was likely his second visit to England in six years, Rǫgnvaldr formally swore that he was John's liegeman. Rǫgnvaldr's visit to England is corroborated by a record, dated 20 May, regarding the English Crown's payment of ten marks for conducting Rǫgnvaldr home. Further corroboration is provided by the record, dated 16 May, concerning the release of some of Rǫgnvaldr's men who had been held in custody at Porchester and Dover. (Note: The circumstances under which these men were detained is unknown.)

In another record, also dated 16 May, John authorised his seneschals, governors, and bailiffs in Ireland to come to Rǫgnvaldr's aid in the event that his territory was threatened by "Wikini or others", since Rǫgnvaldr had bound himself to do the same against John's own enemies. The record of "Wikini" or Vikings in this order may refer to the Norwegian raiders, like those who plundered the Isles in 1210. This particular source reveals that, not only was Rǫgnvaldr protected by John, but that he was also obligated to defend John's interests in the Irish Sea region. As such, Rǫgnvaldr's security was enhanced by English assistance, and John's influence was extended over the Isles at the expense of the Scots.

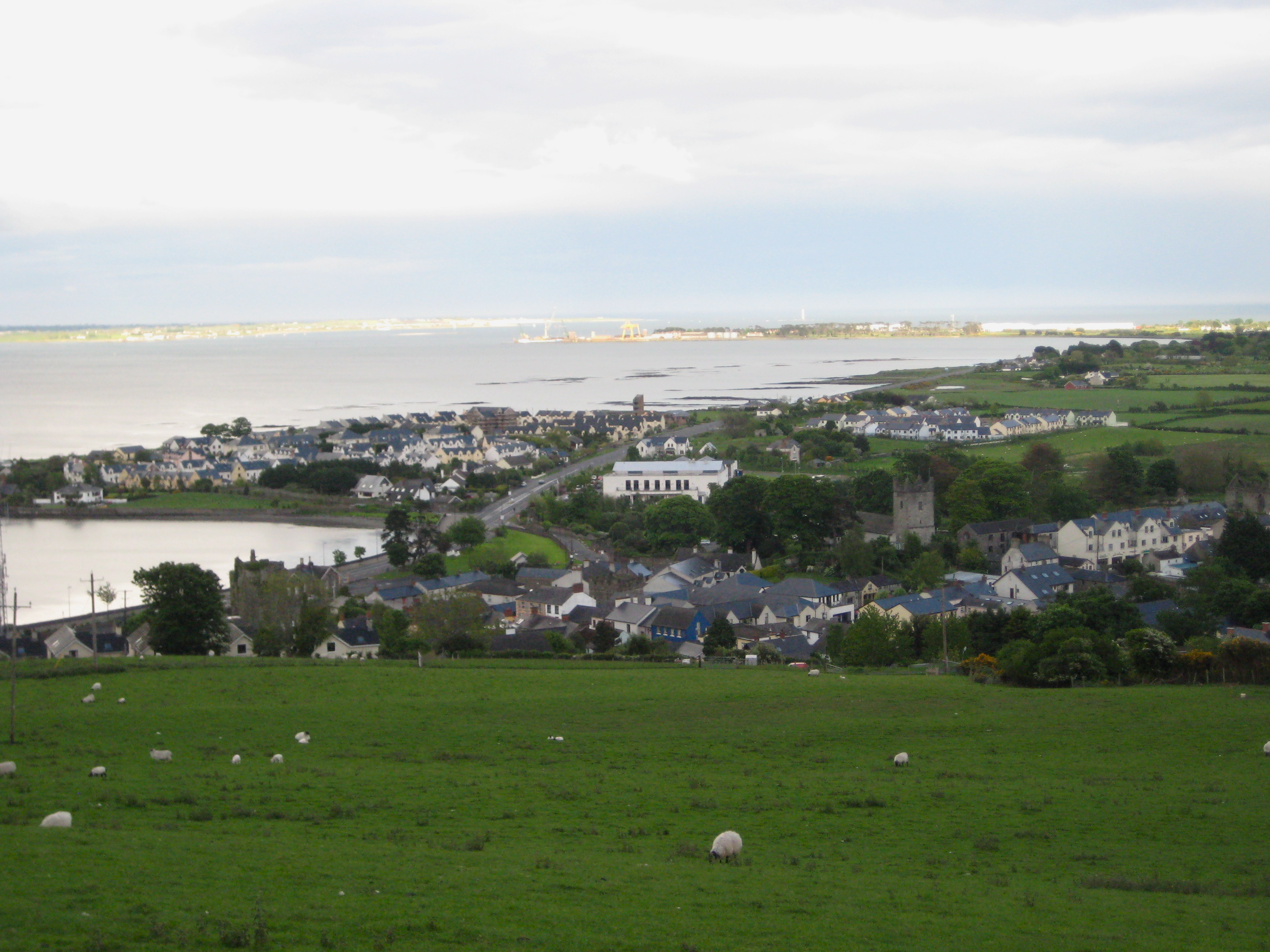
Carlingford, where Rǫgnvaldr was granted lands from the English Crown for the service of a knight. At the time, Carlingford was part of Ulster, however today it located in County Louth.

Yet another transaction dated 16 May, in return for the homage and service that he rendered to the English Crown, Rǫgnvaldr and his heirs received a grant consisting of one knight's fee of land at Carlingford, and one hundred measures of corn to be paid yearly at Drogheda for the service of a knight. The grant gave Rǫgnvaldr a valuable foothold in Ireland, and provided his powerful galley-fleet with an additional safe haven. The precise location of the territory granted to Rǫgnvaldr is unrecorded and unknown. Carlingford had until recently been a power centre of Hugh, and Rǫgnvaldr's grant may fit into the context of filling the power vacuum following the destruction of the Lacy lordship. (Note: At some point during his career, Rǫgnvaldr is recorded to have granted protection to the monks of St Mary's Abbey, Dublin.)

Rǫgnvaldr's gifts from the English Crown may fit into the context of John attempting to offset interference from the Philip Augustus, King of France. At about this time, the French Crown had orchestrated a Franco-Welsh alliance in an attempt to divert the English to deal with a Welsh uprising rather than focus their forces upon the Continent and France in particular. In fact, there is evidence that Norman ships were active off Wales in 1210. Although John had come to terms with Llywelyn ap Iorwerth in 1211, the following year the latter formed a concord with Philip. By May 1212, John succeeded in gaining the support of several foreign lords, such as the counts of Bar, Boulogne, and Flanders, the dukes of Brabant and Limburg, the Holy Roman Emperor, and Rǫgnvaldr himself. Despite these overtures, however, the Welsh uprisings of 1211 and 1212, as well as an English revolt in 1212, all succeeded in keeping English forces from invading France.

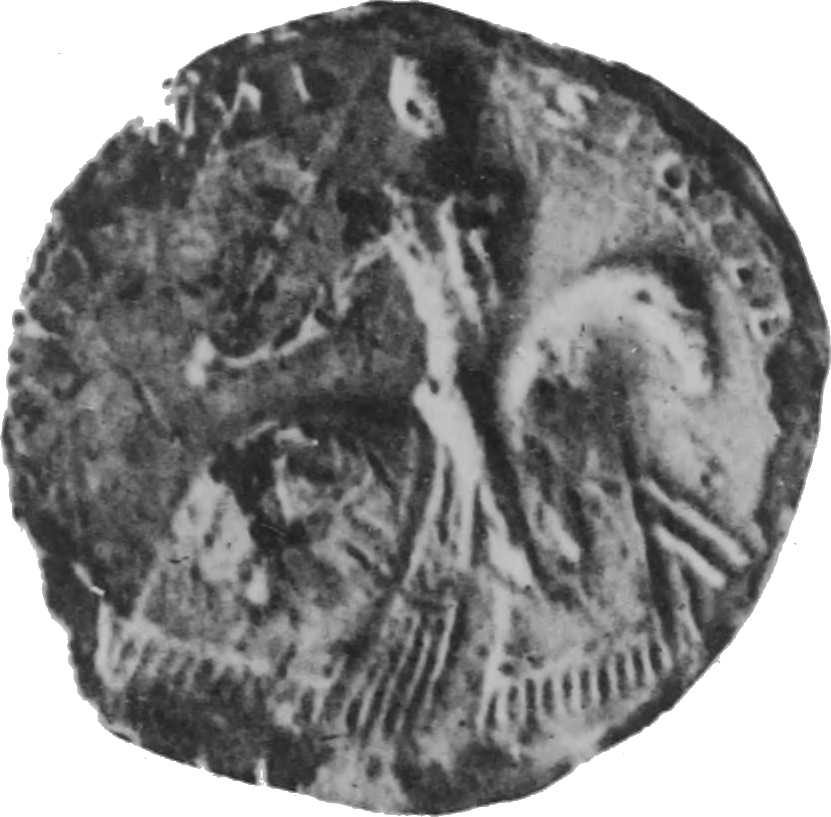
Seal of Alan fitz Roland, Rǫgnvaldr's kinsman and ally.

As a consequence of Rǫgnvaldr's vassalage to the English Crown, and his role as guardian of the English seaways, it is probable that Islesmen were involved in far fewer predatory actions along the English and Irish coasts. At about the same time, several south-western Scottish magnates received grants in the north of Ireland. These included three of Rǫgnvaldr's Meic Fergusa kinsmen: Alan fitz Roland, Lord of Galloway, Alan's brother Thomas fitz Roland, Earl of Atholl, and Donnchad. Such grants appear to have been part of a coordinated campaign of the English and Scottish kings to gain authority over outlying territories where royal influence was limited.

At that time King Rǫgnvaldr was the greatest fighting man in all the western lands. For three whole years he had lived aboard longships and not spent a single night under a sooty roof.

— excerpt of Orkneyinga saga celebrating Rǫgnvaldr's qualities as a sea-king.

A record dated 3 January 1214 appears to confirm the English Crown's intentions of protecting the Islesmen, as it prohibits certain "mariners of Ireland" from entering Rǫgnvaldr's territories at his loss. The English pledges of protection of Rǫgnvaldr and his Irish holdings suggest that he was under immediate pressure at this period. It is possible, therefore, that the 1211/1212 seaborne devastation of Derry by Thomas fitz Roland, and the unidentified sons of Ragnall—apparently Ruaidrí and Domnall—was undertaken in support of Rǫgnvaldr's interests in Ireland. In fact, Thomas fitz Roland and Ruaidrí ransacked Derry again in 1213/1214, and it is also possible that the raids were conducted in the interests of both the Scottish and English Crowns, and specifically aimed at limiting Irish support of the Meic Uilleim dissidents. If these attacks were indeed directed against political enemies of the Scottish and English Crowns, it is not improbable that Rǫgnvaldr and his forces were also involved.

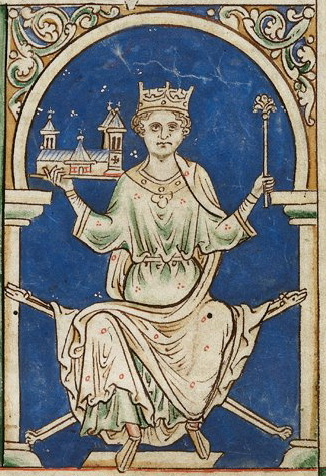
Thirteenth-century depiction of Henry III as he appears on folio 9r of British Library Royal 14 C VII.

John died in October 1216, and was succeeded by his young son, Henry III. On one hand, the English summons of Rǫgnvaldr, dated 16 January 1218, in which he was ordered to amend certain "excesses" committed upon Henry III's men in Ireland and England, could be evidence that Islesmen took advantage of the somewhat fractured English realm by plundering the coasts of England and Ireland. If this was indeed the case, there is no further evidence of any such depredations. On the other hand, the "excesses" could specifically relate to an instance reported by the Annals of Loch Cé, in which Irish herring-fishermen are stated to have committed violence on Mann, and were slain as a consequence of their actions. Later in May, the English Crown commanded that Rǫgnvaldr was to be given safe passage to England in order account for the misconduct of his men.

Whether Rǫgnvaldr actually travelled there that year is unknown, although various records reveal that he certainly did so the following year. For example, he was granted safe passage by the English Crown on 24 September 1219. Evidence of Rǫgnvaldr's activity in England survives in references of homage rendered to Henry III. One such record shows that, in late September, Rǫgnvaldr rendered homage to Henry III, and received the same fief that John had given him. (Note: This record shows that Henry III allowed Rǫgnvaldr the allowance of wheat and wine that John had originally gifted him. Numerous repeated orders, dated 17 June 1220, 4 November 1220, 8 August 1222, 12 March 1225, and 3 October 1226, could well be evidence that the justiciars were less than willing to dole out the grant.) In another record of his homage the English Crown added the qualification: "But if our enemies, or his, shall rebel against us, and him, to the loss of our or his land, then you are to be earnest in your help, for the defence of our land and of his, to our safety and convenience, so long as he shall keep himself faithful towards us". Therefore, whatever "excesses" Rǫgnvaldr's men had committed in the past, the surviving evidence reveals that by 1219 he was again amicably allied to the English king.

== Under the protection of the Pope ==
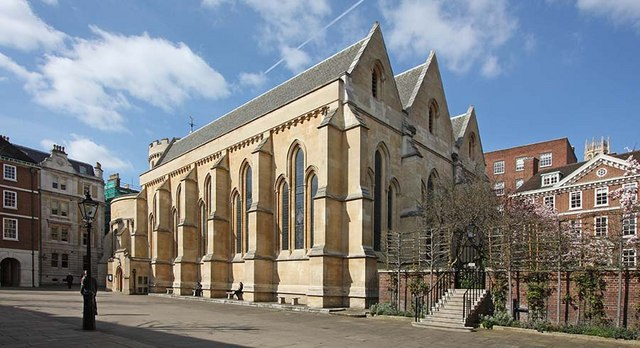
The Temple Church of London.

In September 1219, whilst in London at the Temple Church, Rǫgnvaldr surrendered Mann to the papacy, swore to perform homage for the island, and promised to pay twelve marks sterling in perpetuity as tribute. Rǫgnvaldr's submission was accepted, on behalf of Pope Honorius III, by the papal legate to England, Pandulf, Bishop-elect of Norwich. Such a submission was not unprecedented at the time. For example, John had surrendered his kingdom to the papacy through Pandulf about six years beforehand, whilst facing not only a major crisis from within his own realm, but an imminent invasion by Louis VIII, King of France from without.

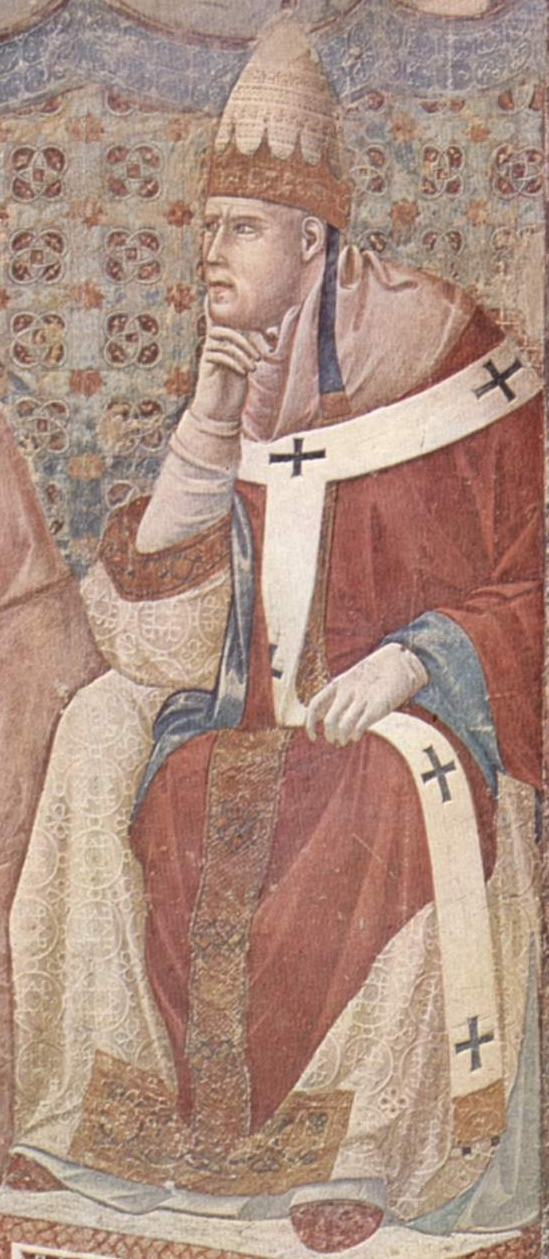
Late thirteenth-century fresco depicting of Pope Honorius III.

The precise impetus behind Rǫgnvaldr's submission is uncertain, although it may well have been related to the threat of ever-strengthening Norwegian kingship. Certainly Hákon had only acceded to the Norwegian kingship two years previously, and by the early part of his reign the civil warring within his realm began to wane. In his submission, Rǫgnvaldr stated that the kingdom was his by hereditary right, and that he held it without any obligation to anyone. This contradicts the statement by Bǫglunga sǫgur, which declare that he and his son swore loyalty to Hákon and took his kingdom in fief of the latter. The submission, therefore, may have been a means by which Rǫgnvaldr attempted to release himself from Norwegian overlordship. On 23 September 1220, Henry III commanded that the Irish justiciary and baronage should lend assistance to Rǫgnvaldr against his enemies. Furthermore, a royal order addressed to Henry III's administrators in Ireland, dated 4 November 1220, commanded Henry III's men to render military aid to Rǫgnvaldr, since the latter had provided evidence that Hákon was plotting to invade his island-kingdom. Not long after this enlistment of English support, the Annals of Loch Cé and the seventeenth-century Annals of the Four Masters report the death of Diarmait Ua Conchobair at the hands of Thomas fitz Roland in 1221. These sources state that Diarmait was in the process of assembling a fleet in the Isles to reclaim the kingship of Connacht. There is a possibility, however, that his actions in the Isles were connected to the Norwegian threat feared by Rǫgnvaldr. In fact, Diarmait's kinsman, Áed na nGall Ua Conchobair, appears to have attempted the procurement of Hákon's assistance at a later date. (Note: In 1224, Henry III's sister, Joan, Queen of Scotland, warned her brother that Hákon was rumoured to be preparing an invasion of Ireland in support of Hugh.)

Rǫgnvaldr's papal submission may have also been linked to his feud with Óláfr. For example, in the last hours of his life, John appealed to Pope Innocent III to ensure the succession of his young son, Henry III. Although the chronology of dissension between Rǫgnvaldr and Óláfr is not entirely clear, the hostilities which entangled Rǫgnvaldr's son broke out in the 1220s. Rǫgnvaldr, therefore, may have intended to secure, not only his own kingship, but also the future succession of his son. In any case, it is unknown how well Rǫgnvaldr kept his obligations to the papacy. The limited surviving evidence of communications between Mann and Rome appear to show that his commitments were not taken up by his successors. Nevertheless, centuries after his death, Rǫgnvaldr's deal with the papacy was commemorated by a fresco in the Vatican Archives. (Note: The fresco was noted in the eighteenth century, and seems to date to about the seventeenth century. It is part of a series of frescoes dealing with the grants of papal fiefs. It contains a Latin inscription which runs: "HONORIO III PONT MAX REGINALDUS REX INSULAE MONAE IN HIBERNICO MARI CORAM LEGATO PONTIFICIO REGNUM SUUM APOSTOLICAE SEDI DONAT".)

== Reunification and Scottish machinations ==
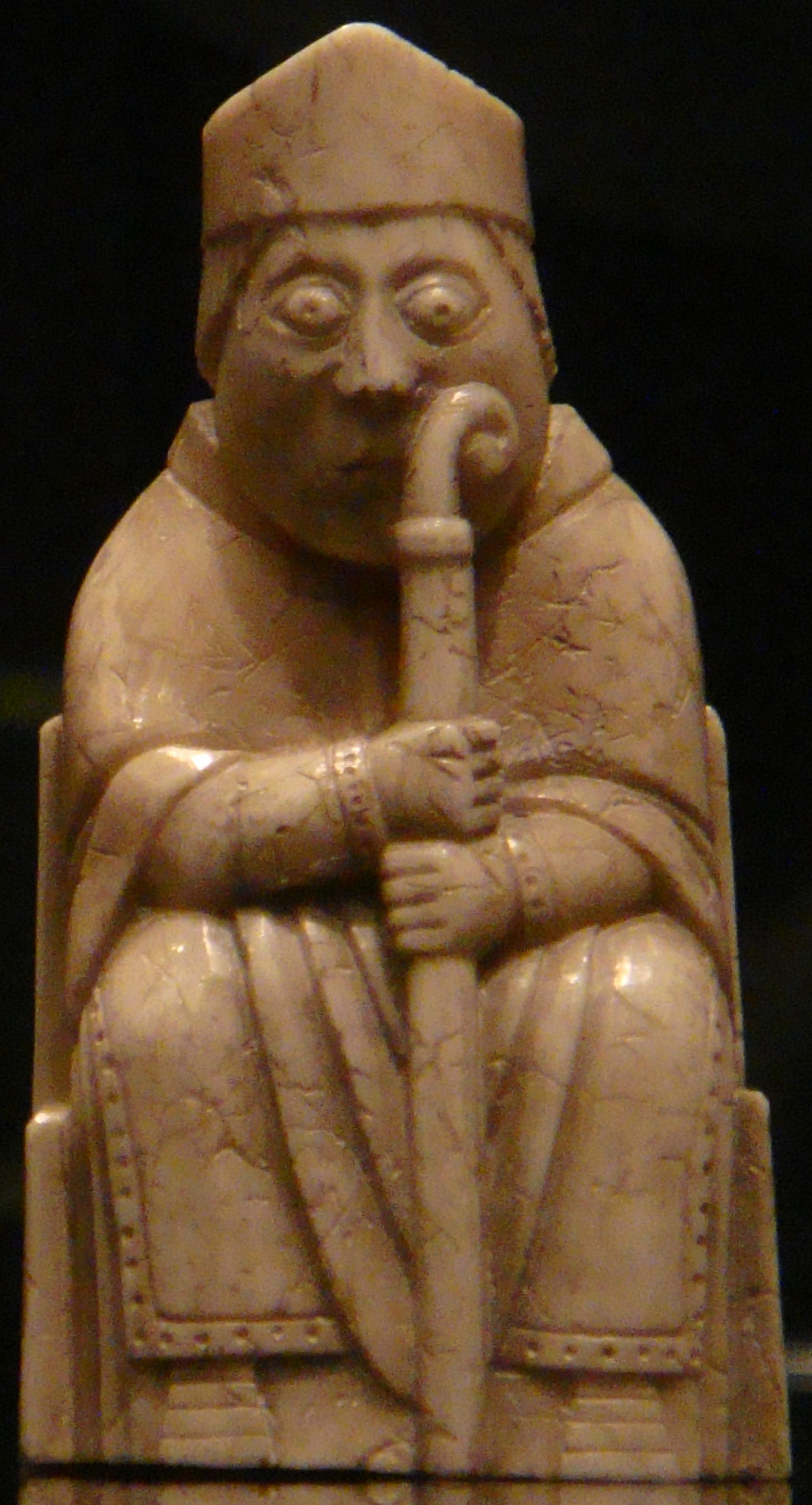
A bishop gaming piece of the Lewis chessmen. (Note: At some point in his reign, Rǫgnvaldr was apparently responsible for the foundation of the Cistercian nunnery at Douglas, as evidenced by a sixteenth-century record of a fifteenth-century inquisition. He is also confirmed his father's grant of commercial privileges to the Cistercian monastery of Holm Cultram, and granted the monastery of St Bees rights to some of the lands of Ormesham.)

Upon Óláfr's return from his pilgrimage, the Chronicle of Mann records that Rǫgnvaldr had him marry "Lauon", the sister of his own wife. Rǫgnvaldr then granted Lewis and Harris back to Óláfr, where the newly-weds proceeded to live until the arrival of Reginald, Bishop of the Isles. The chronicle claims that the bishop disapproved of the marriage on the grounds that Óláfr had formerly had a concubine who was a cousin of Lauon. A synod was then assembled, after which the marriage is stated to have been nullified. Although the chronicle alleges that Óláfr's marriage was doomed for being within a prohibited degree of kinship, there is evidence to suggest that the real reason for its demise was the animosity between the half-brothers. For example, Reginald and Óláfr appear to have been closely associated, as the chronicle notes that, not only was Reginald was a son of Óláfr's sister, but that Óláfr had warmly greeted Reginald when the latter arrived on Lewis and Harris. Furthermore, it was Reginald who had instigated the annulment. In fact, after the previous Bishop of the Isles died in 1217, Reginald and Nicholas de Meaux, Abbot of Furness had vied for the office of bishop. Whilst Reginald appears to have enjoyed the support of Óláfr, Rǫgnvaldr appears to have supported the bid of Reginald's rival, Nicholas.

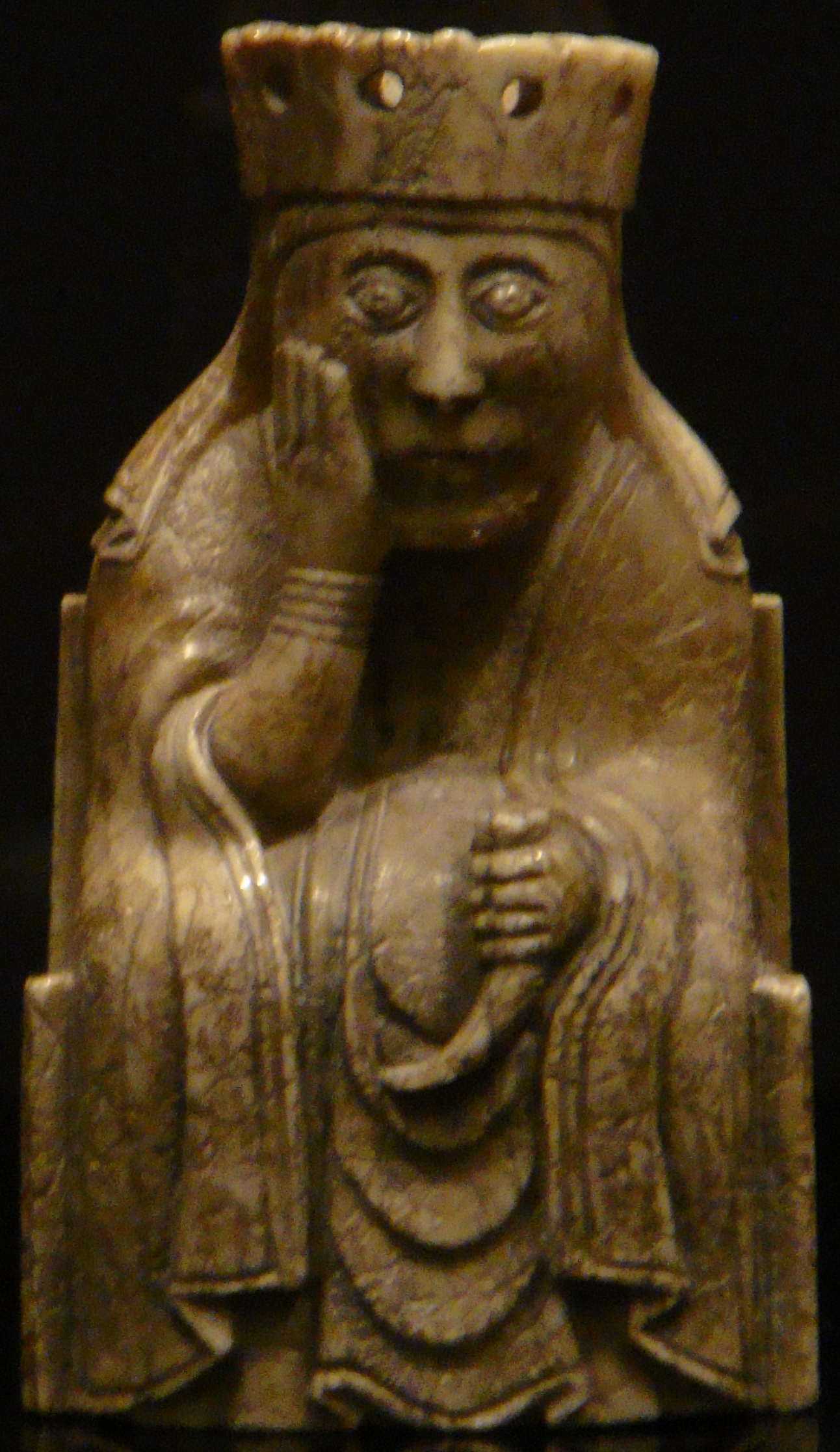
A queen gaming piece of the Lewis chessmen. Although the name of Rǫgnvaldr's wife is unknown, she is styled by the Chronicle of Mann as "regina Insularum" ("Queen of the Isles"). Almost nothing is known of queenship in the Isles.

The precise identity of the half-brothers' shared father-in-law is uncertain. The chronicle describes him as a nobleman from Kintyre, which suggests that he was a member of the Meic Somairle, since sources concerning this kindred link them with Kintyre more than any other region. The father-in-law, therefore, may well have been Rǫgnvaldr's first cousin Ragnall, or Ragnall's son Ruaidrí—both of whom appear to have been styled "Lord of Kintyre" in contemporary sources—or possibly Ragnall's younger son, Domnall. It is conceivable that the first union was undertaken before 1210, perhaps not long after 1200 considering the fact that Guðrøðr Dond—a product of Rǫgnvaldr's marriage—was apparently an adult by 1223 and had fathered at least one son by this date. (Note: One reason why the chronicle fails to name the father-in-law of Rǫgnvaldr and Óláfr could be that the chronicle is biased against him. Another possibility is that the chronicler may have simply not known his name. Likewise, the fact that the chronicle fails to name Lauon's sister—a woman alleged to have played a significant role in the kin-strife between Rǫgnvaldr and Óláfr—could be evidence of a specific bias against her.)

The unions themselves appear to have been orchestrated in an effort to patch up relations between the Meic Somairle and the Crovan dynasty, neighbouring kindreds who had bitterly contested the kingship of the Isles for about sixty years. In fact, it is possible that Rǫgnvaldr's kingship was formally recognised by Ruaidrí, the apparent leading Meic Somairle dynast since Áengus' death in 1210, who thereby established himself as a leading magnate within a reunified Kingdom of the Isles. Since the majority of Ruaidrí's territories appear to have been mainland possessions, it is very likely that the Scottish Crown regarded this reunification as a threat to its own claims of overlordship of Argyll. In fact, it is possible that the Scots' release of Óláfr in 1214 was intended to cause dynastic discord in the Isles. If that was indeed the case, then the Scottish Crown's machinations had temporarily come to nought because of Óláfr's reconciliation and arraigned marriage.

== Civil war and kin-strife ==
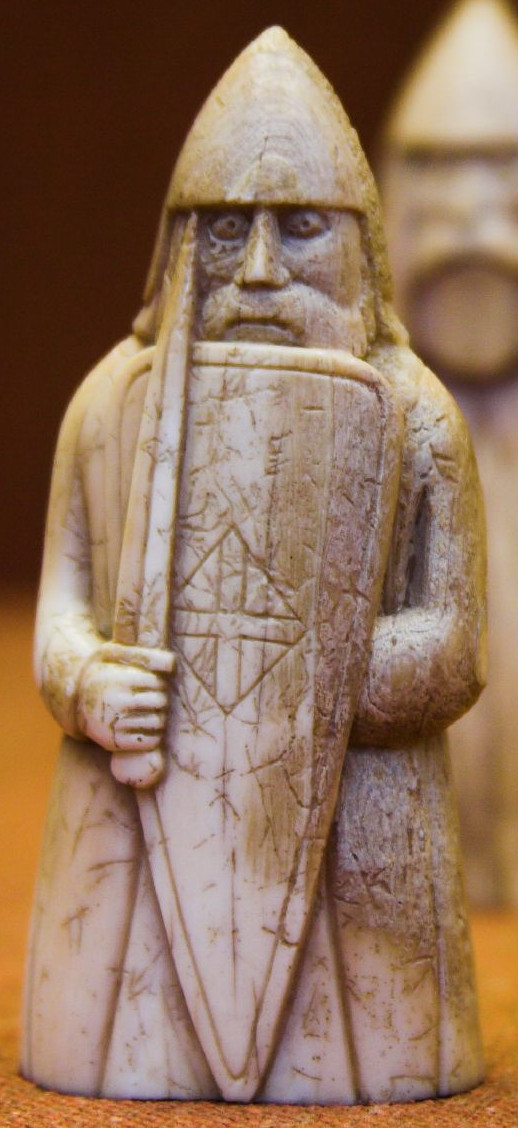
A rook gaming piece of the Lewis chessmen.

Once freed from his arranged marriage, the Chronicle of Mann states that Óláfr proceeded to marry Cristina, daughter of Ferchar mac an tSacairt. The latter emerges from historical obscurity in 1215, and by the mid 1220s—about the time of Cristina and Óláfr's marriage—Alexander II, King of Scotland rewarded Ferchar with the Earldom of Ross for meritorious service to the Scottish Crown. The collapse of Óláfr's previous Meic Somairle marriage took place at about the time that Ruaidrí was seemingly ejected from Kintyre by the forces of Alexander II, King of Scotland in 1221–1222. Óláfr's subsequent realignment with Ferchar—Alexander's protégé—not only appears to evince Óláfr's recognition of the shift of power in north-western Scotland, but may also signal Rǫgnvaldr's loss of support from the Scottish Crown.

If the chronicle is to be believed, Óláfr's separation from Lauon enraged her sister, who surreptitiously tricked her son, Guðrøðr Dond, into attacking Óláfr. Following what he thought were his father's orders, Guðrøðr Dond gathered a force on Skye and proceeded to Lewis and Harris, where the chronicle records that he laid waste to most of the island. Óláfr is said to have only narrowly escaped with a few men, and to have fled to the protection of his father-in-law on the mainland in Ross. Óláfr is stated to have been followed into exile by Páll Bálkason, a sheriff on Skye who refused to take up arms against Óláfr. The chronicle then indicates that the two landed on Skye, and learned where Guðrøðr Dond was stationed, and defeated him in battle. The latter's captured followers were put to death, whilst Guðrøðr Dond himself was blinded and castrated. Although the chronicle maintains that Óláfr was unable to prevent this torture, the Icelandic annals record that Óláfr was indeed responsible for his nephew's plight.

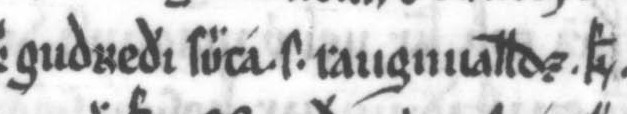
The name of Guðrøðr Dond as it appears on folio 163v of AM 47 fol: "Gudʀeði Svarta s(yni) Raugnualldz konungs". Although Hákonar saga Hákonarsonar (including this excerpt) accords him an epithet meaning "black", the Chronicle of Mann accords him another meaning "brown".

Mutilation and killing of high status kinsmen during power-struggles was not an unknown phenomenon in the peripheral-regions of the British Isles during the High Middle Ages. (Note: According to the twelfth-century Descriptio Kambriæ, in an English account of succession disputes among the Welsh, "the most frightful disturbances occur in their territories as a result, people being murdered, brothers killing each other and even putting each other's eyes out, for as everyone knows from experience it is very difficult to settle disputes of this sort".) In only the century-and-a-half of its existence, at least nine members of the Crovan dynasty perished from mutilation or assassination. As such, there is reason to regard this vicious internecine violence as the Crovan dynasty's greatest weakness. The tribulations inflicted upon Guðrøðr seem to exemplify Óláfr's intent to wrest what he regarded as his birthright from Rǫgnvaldr's bloodline. It is unknown why Rǫgnvaldr had not similarly neutralised Óláfr when he had the chance years before in 1208, although it may have had something to do with international relations. For example, it is possible that his act of showing leniency to Óláfr had garnered Scottish support against the threat of Norwegian overlordship. In any case, the neutralisation of Guðrøðr Dond appears to mark a turning point in the struggle between the Óláfr and Rǫgnvaldr.

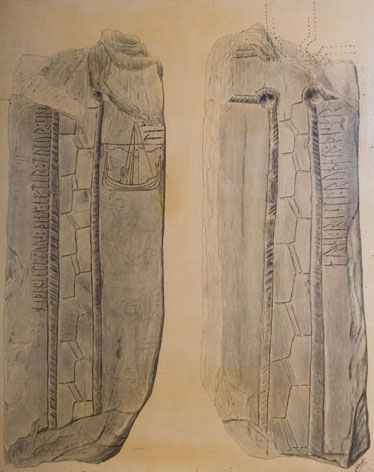
Image a

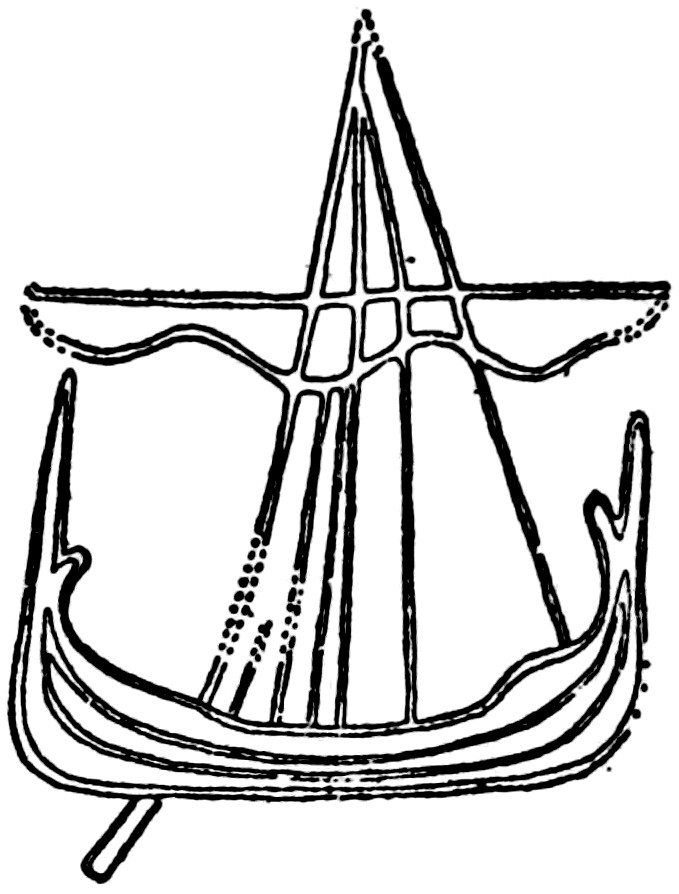
Image b

Maughold IV (image a; detail, image b), a Manx runestone displaying a contemporary sailing vessel. The power of the kings of the Isles laid in their armed galley-fleets. If the contemporary Baile suthach síth Emhna is to be believed, Rǫgnvaldr's own vessel was named Black Swan, or The Swan. (Note: The inscription of the vessel may date to about the time of the Crovan dynasty, possibly from about the eleventh- to the thirteenth century. The vessel appears to be similar to those that appear on seals borne by members of the dynasty.)

Roughly about this point in time, correspondence between Joan, Queen of Scotland and her brother, Henry III, reveals that the Norwegian Crown was rumoured to have been planning a naval expedition west-over-sea. Although Joan's letter places this campaign in the context of a threat to English interests in Ireland, it may be more likely that Hákon's attention was focused upon the escalating situation in the Isles. One possibility is that the queen's correspondence is evidence that Óláfr had appealed to Hákon for supported against Rǫgnvaldr.

The kin-strife largely took place on Skye and Lewis and Harris, islands that were clearly important within the kingdom. In fact, there is evidence to suggest that the kingdom's northern territories were granted by reigning kings to heir-apparents or disaffected dynasts. For example, during the eleventh-century reign of the dynasty's founder, Guðrøðr Crovan, the northern portion of the realm may have been governed by Guðrøðr Crovan's succeeding son, Lǫgmaðr. The fact that Rǫgnvaldr was residing in the Hebrides when his father died in 1187 may indicate that, despite the chronicle's claims to the contrary, Rǫgnvaldr was indeed the rightful heir to the kingship. Furthermore, since Rǫgnvaldr's son is recorded on Skye, the possibility exists that he resided there as his father's heir-apparent. Rǫgnvaldr's grant of Lewis and Harris to Óláfr may, therefore, indicate that Óláfr was at least temporarily regarded as Rǫgnvaldr's rightful successor. On the other hand, it is also possible that Rǫgnvaldr's grant was given in the context of appeasing a disgruntled dynast passed over for the kingship. In any event, it is apparent that such territorial fragmentation would have severely weakened the realm.

== Contested episcopate ==
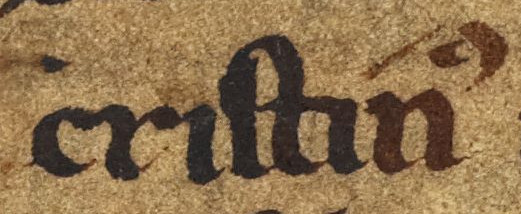
The name of Cristinus, Bishop of the Isles as it appears on folio 50v of British Library Cotton Julius A VII: "Cristinus". Cristinus seems to have been a Meic Somairle appointee, and was evidently replaced by a bishop aligned with the Crovan dynasty early in Rǫgnvaldr's reign.

The ecclesiastical jurisdiction within Rǫgnvaldr's realm was the far-flung Diocese of the Isles. Like the Kingdom of the Isles itself, the origins of the diocese may well lie with the Uí Ímair imperium. In the mid twelfth century, during the reign of Rǫgnvaldr's father, the diocese came to be incorporated into the newly established Norwegian Archdiocese of Niðaróss. In effect, the political reality of the Diocese of the Isles—its territorial borders and nominal subjection to Norway—appears to have mirrored that of the Kingdom of the Isles. Before the close of the twelfth century, however, evidence of a new ecclesiastical jurisdiction—the Diocese of Argyll—begins to emerge during ongoing contentions between the Meic Somairle and the Crovan dynasty.

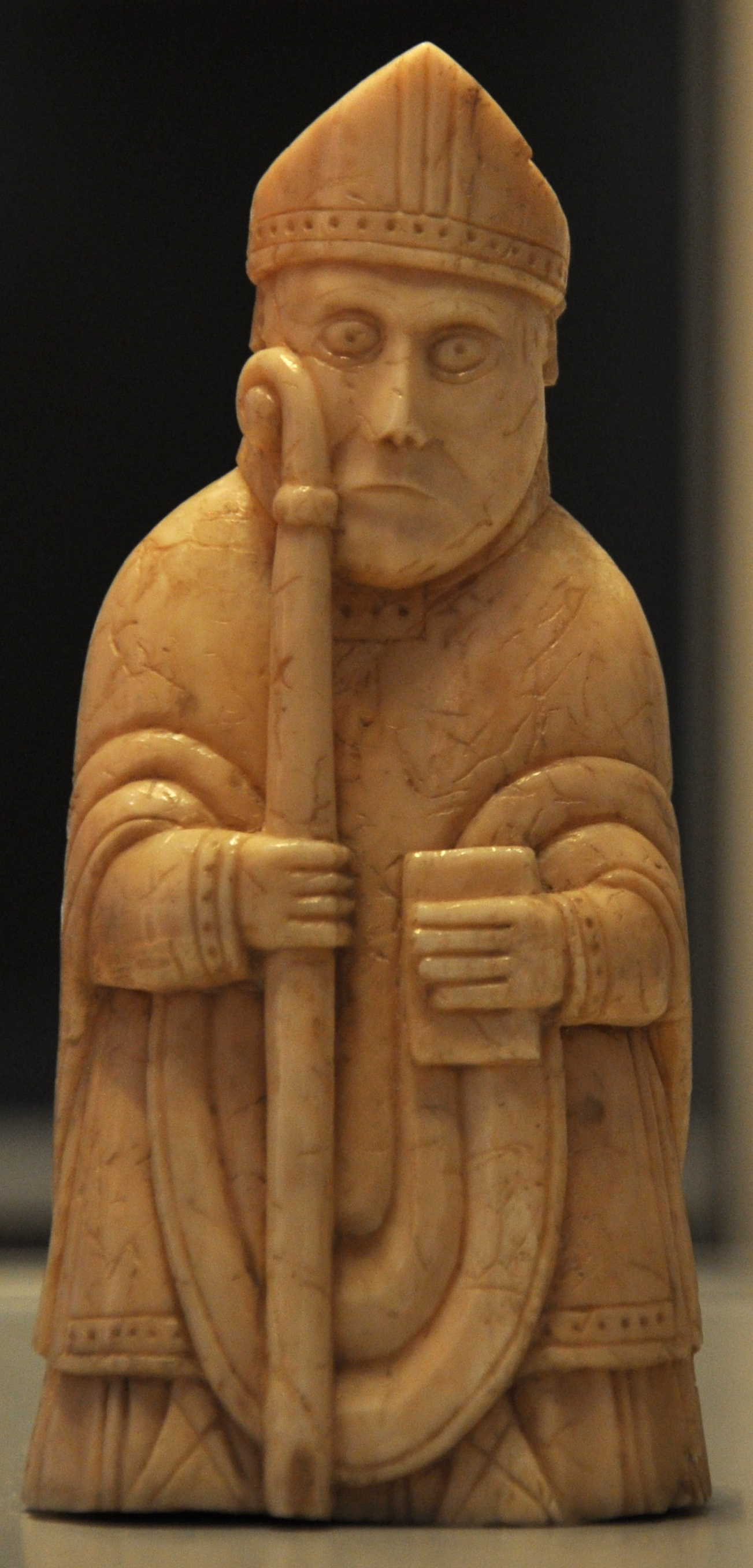
A bishop gaming piece of the Lewis chessmen. The mitre depicted on this piece is that of a mid twelfth- to late twelfth-century bishop. The pieces are likely to have been crafted in Niðaróss (now known as Trondheim). Some of the pieces may have been gifts from the Archbishop of Niðaróss to the Bishop of the Isles during the reign of Rǫgnvaldr's father.

In the early 1190s, the Chronicle of Mann reveals that Cristinus, Bishop of the Isles, an Argyllman who was probably a Meic Somairle candidate, was deposed and replaced by Michael, a Manxman who appears to have been backed by Rǫgnvaldr. The tenure of Cristinus seems to have spanned at least two decades during a sustained period of Meic Somairle power in the Isles. His downfall, however, came about at the time of the Crovan dynasty's resurgence under the then-recently enthroned Rǫgnvaldr.

After Michael's death in 1203, a certain Koli is recorded to have been consecrated in 1210. The situation between this span of years is uncertain. On one hand, it is possible that the see was vacant between these years. On the other hand, Koli could have been elected bishop in 1203, but only consecrated in 1210. Another possibility is that the see was administered from Lismore—the future seat of the Diocese of Argyll—under the ultimate authority of Áengus, the aforementioned Meic Somairle dynast slain in 1210.

There is also a possibility that Koli's consecration was connected to the attack on Iona in 1209/1210. Not only does the Norwegian expedition appear to have compelled Rǫgnvaldr and his son to submit to the Norwegian Crown in 1210, but it also made landfall in Orkney, and brought back to Norway the joint Orcadian earls and their bishop. The entire undertaking, therefore, may have been designed to reassert Norwegian overlordship over both secular and ecclesiastical authorities in Norwegian satellites overseas. If correct, the voyage would seem to have been orchestrated by both Ingi and his chief prelate, Þórir Guðmundarson, Archbishop of Niðaróss. Although the Meic Somairle controversially refounded Iona at the turn of the century, and further secured its independence from the Diocese of the Isles by placing it under the protection of the papacy, the Norwegian sack of the island may not have been a sanctioned act One possibility is that a visit to the island by the Norwegian delegation disastrously deteriorated into otherwise unplanned violence.

The next bishop after Koli was Reginald. Although Reginald's rival for the episcopate, Nicholas, is recorded to have gained the support of the communities of Furness and Rushen, he does not appear to have ever occupied the see. In fact, Nicholas appears to have spent much of his time in Rome, since correspondence from the papacy to Walter de Gray, Archbishop of York, concerning Nicholas' final resignation, states that the latter had long been exiled from his see because "the lord of the land and others" were "altogether opposed to him". As early as November 1219, papal correspondence reveals that the pope had urged the leading men of the Isles to accept Nicholas' episcopacy.

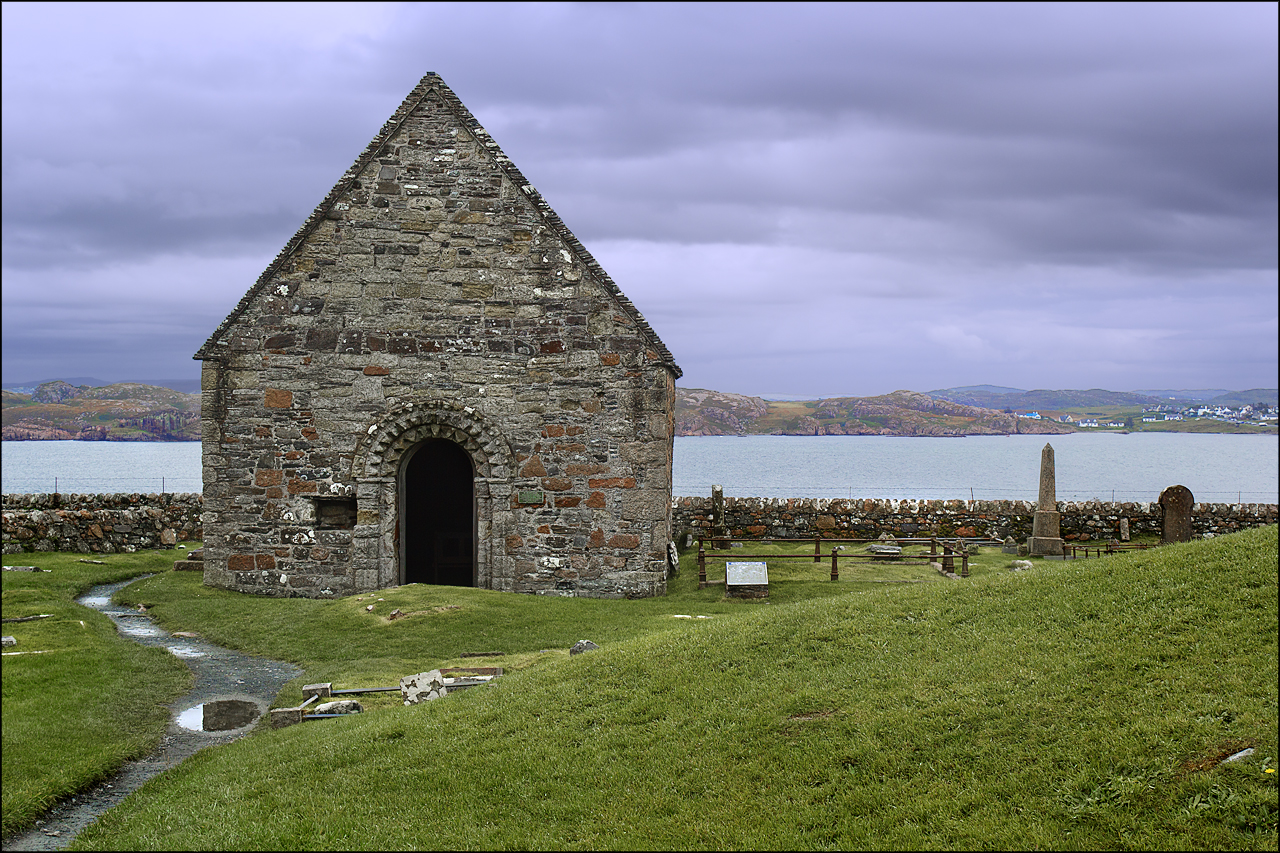
St Oran's Chapel, the oldest intact building on Iona, dates to the mid twelfth century, and may have been built by either the Meic Somairle or the Crovan dynasty.

Rǫgnvaldr's remarkably warm relations with the papacy, and his deteriorating relationship with Óláfr, could be evidence that the papal correspondence in support of Nicholas was directed at Óláfr instead of Rǫgnvaldr. Further indication of Rǫgnvaldr's support of Nicholas may be his renewal of the rights of St Mary's Abbey, Furness to elect the Bishop of the Isles. (Note: The monks of Furness were granted the right to elect a Bishop of the Isles by Rǫgnvaldr's grandfather. In 1194/1195, Pope Celestine III confirmed these rights to Furness.) The English Crown's warning to Óláfr about harming the monks of Furness could betray some sort of grievance with the community, whilst Rǫgnvaldr's burial at Furness appears show evidence his own affinity with the community. The controversy over the appointment of bishops, therefore, appears to have been yet another aspect of ongoing kin-strife within the Crovan dynasty. In fact, the final resignation of Nicholas in 1224 corresponds to the realignment of the kingdom between Rǫgnvaldr and Óláfr, and the whole dispute coincides with the Óláfr's gradual successes against Rǫgnvaldr. In any case, Reginald's successor was a man named John who apparently died in an accident not long afterwards. The next bishop was Simon, a man consecrated in 1226 by the Archbishop of Niðaróss, and whose tenure outlived both Rǫgnvaldr and Óláfr.

== Alliance with Alan of Galloway ==
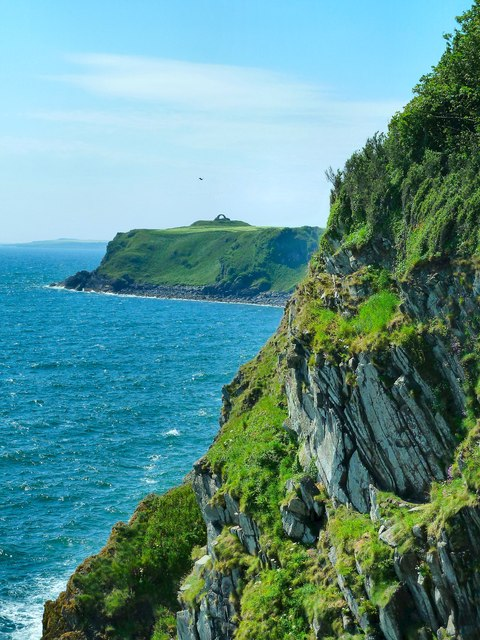
Ruinous Cruggleton Castle from a distance. The fortress was likely the western power centre of Alan fitz Roland, Lord of Galloway.

In 1224, the year following the defeat of Rǫgnvaldr's son, the chronicle reveals that Óláfr took hostages from the leading men of the Hebridean portion of the realm, and with a fleet of thirty-two ships, landed on Mann at Ronaldsway, where he confronted Rǫgnvaldr directly. It was then agreed that the kingdom would be split between the two: with Rǫgnvaldr keeping Mann itself along with the title of king, and Óláfr retaining a share in the Hebrides. (Note: Rǫgnvaldr may be the eponym of Ronaldsway, a place name derived from the Old Norse personal name Rǫgnvaldr and vað ("ford"). The site was once a landing place for Castle Rushen and Castletown, but is now the site of Isle of Man Airport. The chronicle's account of Óláfr's landing is the earliest date accorded to the place name. The same source's account of hostilities on Mann, between the half-brothers in the years to come, suggests that Ronaldsway was by then a power centre of Rǫgnvaldr on the island. Rǫgnvaldr could have initiated construction of nearby Castle Rushen to consolidate his control there. The record of Óláfr's landing at Ronaldsway suggests that there was some sort of defensive site there. Another surviving place name perhaps relevant to Rǫgnvaldr is Totronald on Coll. This place name is ultimately derived from the same personal name, and Old Norse element tupt ("piece of ground", "homestead", "ruins"). Two other place names, both lochans, also preserve the personal name on the island. At one point, Baile suthach síth Emhna acclaims Rǫgnvaldr as "King of Coll".) With Óláfr's rise at Rǫgnvaldr expense, the latter turned to Alan, one of Scotland's most powerful magnates. Alan and Rǫgnvaldr were certainly closely connected. Both were great-grandsons of Fergus, Lord of Galloway; both had received Ulster lands from the English at about the same time; and it is possible that connections between the Isles and Galloway had led to Rǫgnvaldr's involvement with the Scottish Crown in Caithness.

In a letter from Alan to Henry III, dated the year of the partitioning between the half-brothers, Alan mentioned that he was preoccupied with his army and fleet, travelling from island to island. This statement may well evince the beginning of the joint military operations, conducted by Alan and Rǫgnvaldr against Óláfr, assigned by the chronicle to the following year. According to the latter source, however, the campaigning came to nought because the Manx were unwilling to battle against Óláfr and the Hebrideans. This record appears to show that Alan portrayed his actions in the Isles as related to his conflict with the Lacys in Ireland. As such, the correspondence could be further evidence that the Lacys' Ulster ambitions were aligned with Óláfr in the Isles.

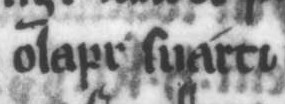
The name of Rǫgnvaldr's rival half-brother, Óláfr, as it appears on folio 163r of AM 47 fol (Eirspennill): "Olafr suárti".

Also in 1224, the thirteenth-century Hákonar saga Hákonarsonar reports that Hákon was visited by a certain Gillikristr, Óttar Snækollsson, and many Islesmen, who presented the king with letters concerning certain needs of their lands. One possibility is that these needs refer to the violent kin-strife and recent treaty between the half-brothers. The saga may therefore reveal that the Norwegian Crown was approached by either representatives of either side of the inter-dynastic conflict, or perhaps by neutral chieftains caught in the middle. (Note: Another possibility is that the visiting delegation was concerned with the threat of Scottish aggression in the Isles, following the Scottish Crown's conquest of Kintyre in 1221/1222.) Further attempts to quell the infighting by way of the Norwegian Crown may have been undertaken in 1226, when it is remarked by the same source that Simon, Bishop of the Isles met with Hákon.

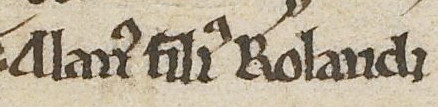
Alan's name as it appears on folio 28v of British Library Cotton Faustina B IX (the Chronicle of Melrose): "Alanus filius Rolandi".

A short time later, perhaps in about 1225 or 1226, the chronicle reveals that Rǫgnvaldr oversaw the marriage of a daughter of his to Alan's young illegitimate son, Thomas. Unfortunately for Rǫgnvaldr, this marital alliance appears to have cost him the kingship, since the chronicle records that the Manxmen had him removed from power and replaced with Óláfr. The recorded resentment of the union could indicate that Alan's son was intended to eventually succeed Rǫgnvaldr, who was perhaps about sixty years-old at the time, and whose grandchildren were presumably still very young. In fact, it is possible that, in light of Rǫgnvaldr's advanced age and his son's mutilation, a significant number of the Islesmen regarded Óláfr as the rightful heir. Such an observation could well account for the lack of enthusiasm that the Manxmen had for Alan and Rǫgnvaldr's campaign in the Hebrides. Since Thomas was likely little more than a teenager at the time, it may well have been obvious to contemporary observers that Alan was the one who would hold the real power in the kingdom. From the perspective of the Scottish Crown, it is conceivable that Alan's ambitions in the Isles were encouraged by the prospect of Alan's son becoming a dependable client-king on Mann, and the potential to further extend and strengthen Scottish royal authority along the western seaboard, bringing stability to the war-torn region. As for Alan—a man who faced the probability that Galloway would be partitioned between his legitimate daughters on his eventual death—the marital alliance may have been conducted as a means to ensure a power base for Thomas, whose illegitimacy threatened to exclude him from inheriting his father's domain under the feudal laws of the English and Scottish realms.

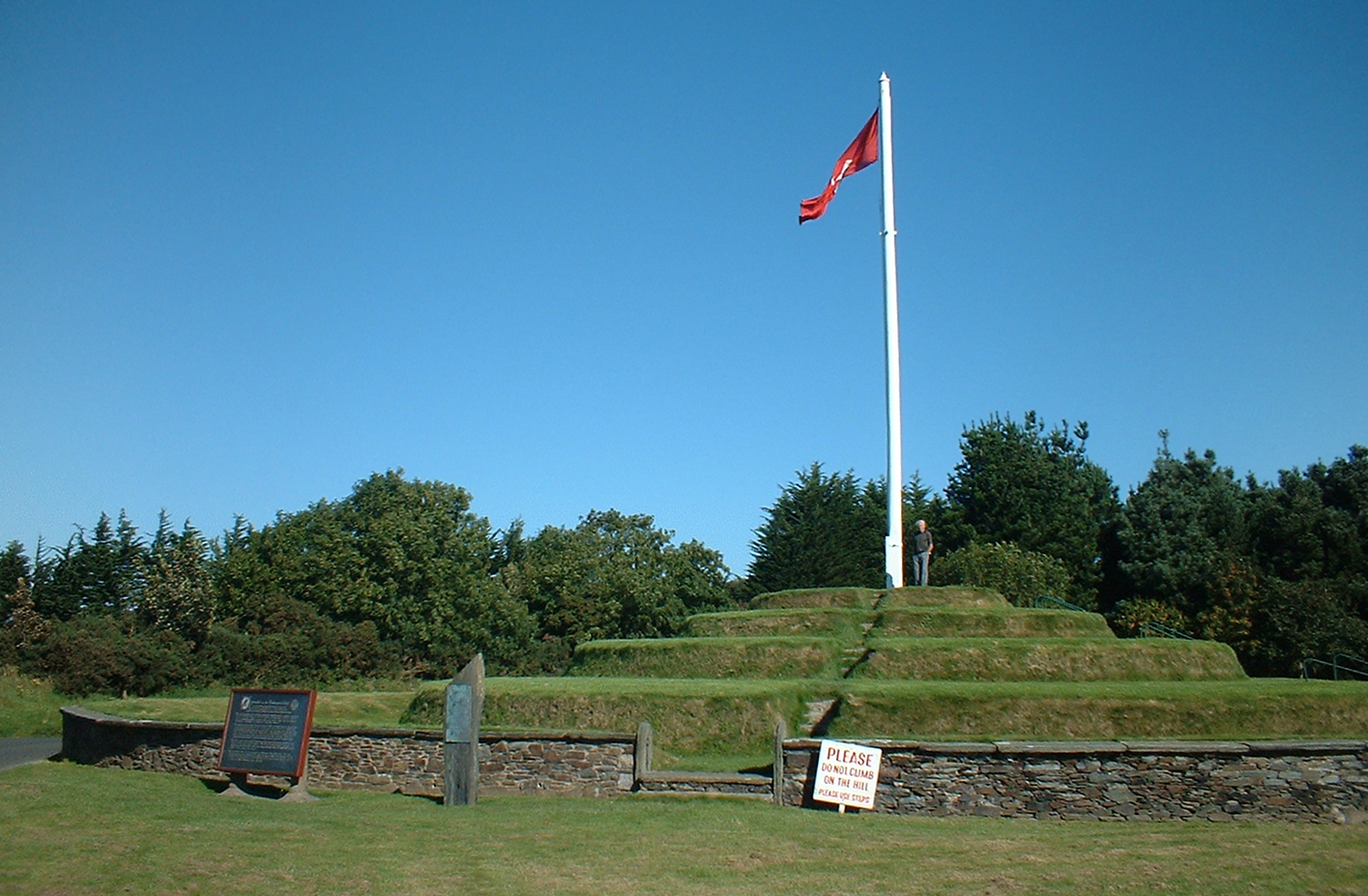
Tynwald Hill, near St John's may have been a national assembly site of the Kingdom of the Isles. It may well have been the place where the Islesmen publicly inaugurated their kings, proclaimed new laws, and resolved disputes. Be that as it may, much of the visible site dates only to the eighteenth-, nineteenth-, and twentieth century. Tynwald was the site of the final conflict between Óláfr and Rǫgnvaldr.

At this low point of his career, the deposed Rǫgnvaldr appears to have gone into exile at Alan's court in Galloway. In 1228, whilst Óláfr and his chieftains were absent in Hebrides, the chronicle records of an invasion of Mann by Rǫgnvaldr, Alan, and Thomas fitz Roland. The attack appears to have resulted in the complete devastation of the southern half of the island, since the chronicle declares that it was almost reduced to a desert. The chronicle's report that Alan installed bailiffs on Mann, with instructions to collect tribute from the island and send it back to Galloway, may reveal the price Rǫgnvaldr had to pay for Alan's support in the affair. In fact, Rǫgnvaldr's role in the takeover is unrecorded. Suffering serious setbacks at the hands of his enemies, Óláfr reached out for English assistance against his half-brother, as evidenced by correspondence between Henry III and Óláfr in which the latter alluded to aggression dealt from Alan. Eventually, after Alan vacated Mann for home, Óláfr and his forces reappeared on the island, and routed the remaining Gallovidians; and thus, the chronicle declares, peace was restored to Mann.

In the same year, English records reveal that Henry III attempted to broker a peace between the half-brothers, and gave Óláfr safe passage to England. This correspondence may have led to Óláfr's temporary absence from Mann that year. It could also roughly mark the point when Rǫgnvaldr finally lost English support. Although the English Crown technically recognised Óláfr's kingship in correspondence sent to him the year before, the aggressive tone directed at him suggests that the preferred dynast may well have Rǫgnvaldr at that point in time. (Note: There are several other sources evidencing Rǫgnvaldr's amiable relationship with Henry III in the 1220s. On 4 November 1220, for instance, Rǫgnvaldr was confirmed of his knight's fee by the English king. In 1222, and again in October 1226—the year of his overthrow—Rǫgnvaldr's English privileges were also renewed.)

== Final confrontation and death ==
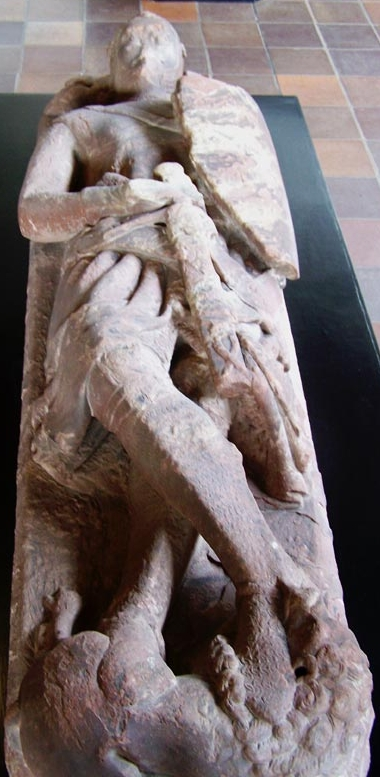
This mediaeval effigy, found at St Mary's Abbey, Furness, has been dubiously associated with Rǫgnvaldr since the nineteenth century.

In what was likely early January 1229, the chronicle records that Rǫgnvaldr caught the forces of Óláfr unaware, as Rǫgnvaldr sailed from Galloway with five ships, and launched a nocturnal raid upon the harbour at St Patrick's Isle, near what is today the town of Peel. During this assault, the chronicle records that Rǫgnvaldr had all of the ships of Óláfr and his chieftains destroyed. Although the chronicle's description of the attack alludes to Gallovidian involvement, as it states that the expedition originated from Galloway, the fact that Rǫgnvaldr commanded only five ships suggests that this support may have been waning. This does not necessary indicate that Alan abandoned Rǫgnvaldr's cause, however, as Alan may well have been engaged in campaigning against the ongoing Meic Uilleim insurrection against the Scottish Crown. Even if this was the case, Rǫgnvaldr may have also considered Alan's involvement a detriment at this stage.

Rǫgnvaldr followed up on his assault by establishing himself in the southern part of Mann, as the chronicle records that he won over the support of the southerners. Meanwhile, Óláfr is stated to have assembled his forces in the north of Mann, indicating that the island was divided between the two men for much of January and February, before what would be their final confrontation. According to the chronicle, Rǫgnvaldr and Óláfr led their armies to Tynwald. (Note: The chronicle's account of this episode and another dating to 1237 are the earliest records of the place name.McDonald (2007b) p. 174; Broderick (2003).) The derivation of this place name—from the Old Norse elements þing ("assembly") and vǫllr ("field", "meadow")—reveals that it was an assembly site, which in turn suggests that negotiations may have been intended.

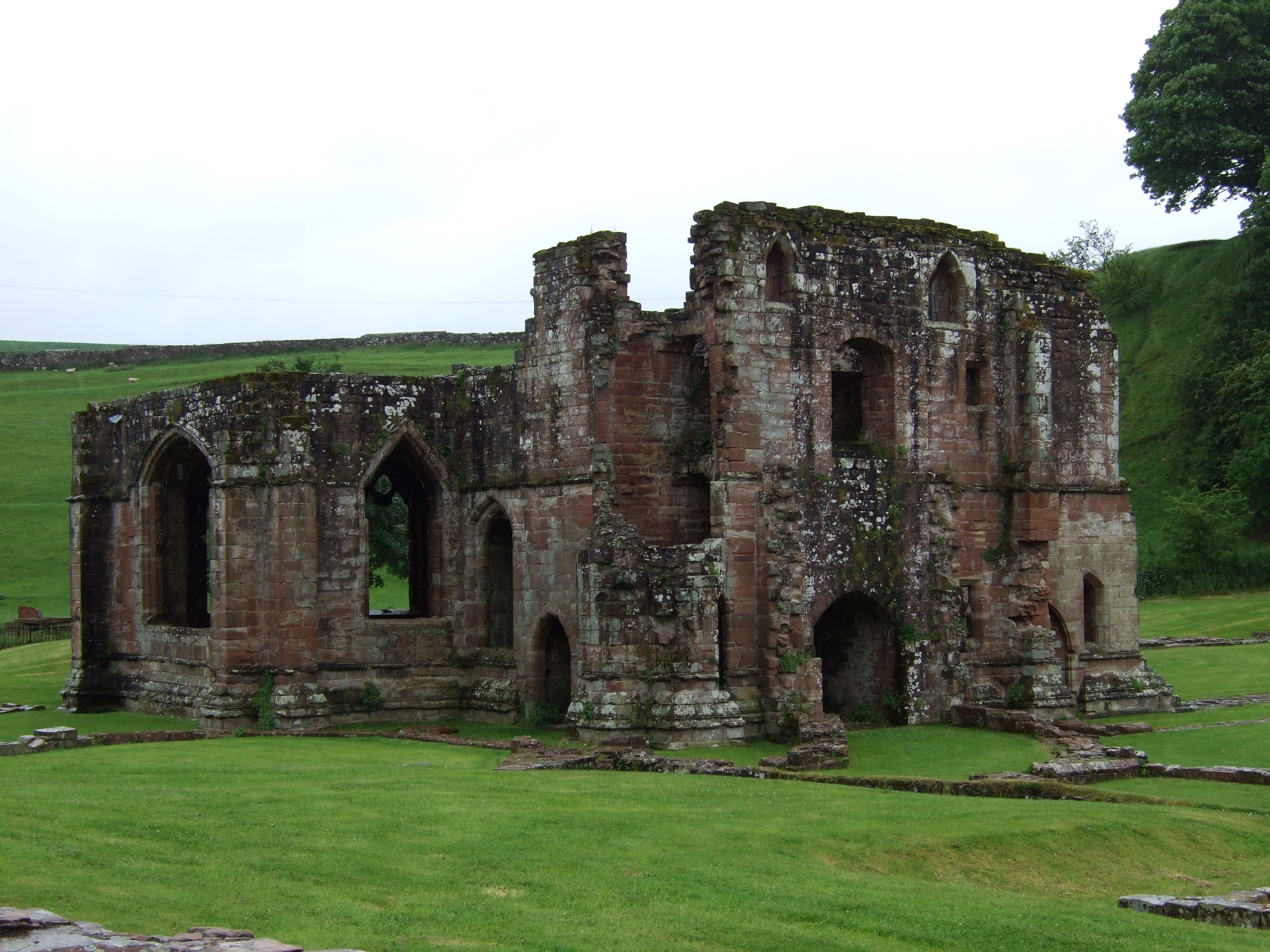
Ruinous St Mary's Abbey, Furness, where Rǫgnvaldr was laid to rest.

On 14 February, the festival of St Valentine, the chronicle records that Óláfr's forces launched an attack upon Rǫgnvaldr at Tynwald, where Rǫgnvaldr's troops were routed and he himself was slain. Whilst Rǫgnvaldr's fall is laconically corroborated by the Icelandic annals, other sources appear to suggest that his death was due to treachery. The fourteenth-century Chronicle of Lanercost, for example, states that Rǫgnvaldr "fell a victim to the arms of the wicked"; whilst the Chronicle of Mann states that, although Óláfr grieved at his half-brother's death, he never exacted vengeance upon his killers. The chronicle states that the monks of Rushen took Rǫgnvaldr's body to Furness, where he was buried at the abbey in a place that he had chosen beforehand. (Note: Although it is unknown where Rǫgnvaldr's paternal-grandfather was buried, his own father was buried on Iona. Óláfr, and two of his sons, were buried at Rushen.) A particular sandstone effigy of an armed, mail-clad warrior, found in the north aisle of the abbey, has been associated with Rǫgnvaldr since the first half of the nineteenth century. Such an association is nevertheless dubious at best.

== Ancestry ==
Ancestors of Rǫgnvaldr Guðrøðarson

8. Guðrøðr Crovan, King of Dublin and the Isles (died 1095) (Note: Guðrøðr Crovan's ancestry is uncertain, although he very well may have been an Uí Ímair dynast.)
4. Óláfr Guðrøðarson, King of the Isles (died 1153)
2. Guðrøðr Óláfsson, King of Dublin and the Isles (died 1187)
10. Fergus, Lord of Galloway (died 1161) (Note: Fergus' ancestry is uncertain.)
5. Affraic
22. Henry I, King of England (died 1135)
11. name unknown (Note: Affraic's mother was an illegitimate daughter of Henry I, King of England (died 1135).)
1. Rǫgnvaldr Guðrøðarson, King of the Isles (died 1229)

== Citations ==
Rǫgnvaldr Guðrøðarson Crovan dynasty Died: 14 February 1229
Regnal titles
Preceded by Guðrøðr Óláfsson	King of the Isles; 1187–1226	Succeeded by Óláfr Guðrøðarson
