= O Oes Gwrtheyrn =

Medieval Welsh chronicle

O Oes Gwrtheyrn Gwrtheneu (From the Age of Vortigern the Most Slender) is a fourteenth-century Welsh chronicle. The work spans the age from Vortigern to the reign of John, King of England.
