= Crovan =

Crovan may refer to:

- Godred Crovan (died 1095), Norse-Gaelic ruler of the kingdoms of Dublin and the Isles
- Crovan dynasty, ruling family of islands off north-west Britain in the 11th–13th centuries
