= Haraldr Guðrøðarson =

King of the Isles
- Reign: 1249–1250
- Predecessor: Rǫgnvaldr Óláfsson
- Successor: Magnús Óláfsson
- House: Crovan dynasty
- Father: Guðrøðr Rǫgnvaldsson

Haraldr Guðrøðarson was a mid thirteenth-century King of the Isles. He was the son of Guðrøðr Rǫgnvaldsson, King of the Isles, son of Rǫgnvaldr Guðrøðarson, King of the Isles. Haraldr Guðrøðarson and his predecessors were members of the Crovan dynasty, and ruled an island-kingdom that encompassed the Isle of Man and portions of the Hebrides, variously known as the Kingdom of the Isles or the Kingdom of Mann and the Isles.

In the early thirteenth century, Haraldr Guðrøðarson's paternal grandfather, Rǫgnvaldr Guðrøðarson, fought over the kingship with his younger half-brother, Óláfr Guðrøðarson. The kin-strife between the two was continued by their descendants, and in time included Haraldr Guðrøðarson himself. Rǫgnvaldr Guðrøðarson was slain in 1229, whereupon Óláfr took up the kingship. In 1231, Óláfr co-ruled a split kingdom with Rǫgnvaldr Guðrøðarson's son aforesaid son, Guðrøðr Rǫgnvaldsson. On the latter's death in the same year, Óláfr ruled the entire kingdom until his own death in 1237, whereupon he was succeeded by his son, Haraldr Óláfsson, who was in turn succeeded by another son of Óláfr, Rǫgnvaldr Óláfsson.

In 1249, Rǫgnvaldr Óláfsson was slain by a knight who appears to have been an accomplice of Haraldr Guðrøðarson. Immediately following the assassination, Haraldr Guðrøðarson first appears in the mediaeval Chronicle of Mann, the main historical source for the Crovan dynasty, when it records that he took control of the island-kingdom and replaced the chieftains of the old regime with followers of his own choosing. Although he was recognised as the legitimate ruler of the kingdom by Henry III, King of England at first, he was later summoned to Norway by Hákon Hákonarson, King of Norway, for his seizure of the kingdom. Upon his removal from Mann, Haraldr Guðrøðarson is not heard from again. In his absence, Magnús Óláfsson, yet another son of Óláfr, unsuccessfully attempted to seize Mann with Hebridean and Norwegian military support. The leadership of the Manx defenders in this action may have been adherents to Haraldr Guðrøðarson's cause. Even so, Magnús returned two years later and succeeded to the kingship, becoming the last of the sea-kings of the Crovan dynasty.

== Background ==
Haraldr Guðrøðarson was a member of the Crovan dynasty, a family of sea-kings who ruled the Isle of Man and parts of the Hebrides from the late eleventh century to the mid thirteenth century. He was the son of Guðrøðr Rǫgnvaldsson, King of the Isles, who was in turn a son of Rǫgnvaldr Guðrøðarson, King of the Isles. Although the latter monarch may have managed to rule a somewhat independent kingdom, surrounded by formidable Norwegian, Scottish, and English monarchs, his successors fell under the shadow of Hákon Hákonarson, King of Norway, and rendered tribute to the latter in recognition of Norwegian overlordship.

Rǫgnvaldr Guðrøðarson and his younger half-brother, Óláfr Guðrøðarson, warred over the dynasty's island-kingdom in the early thirteenth century, until the former was slain battling Óláfr in 1229. Rǫgnvaldr Guðrøðarson's aforesaid son, Guðrøðr Rǫgnvaldsson, took up his father's claim to the throne, and at his height co-ruled the kingdom with Óláfr in 1231. Guðrøðr Rǫgnvaldsson was slain in 1231, however, and Óláfr ruled the entire island-kingdom peacefully afterwards until his own death in 1237. Óláfr was succeeded by his son, Haraldr Óláfsson, who later travelled to Norway and married a daughter of Hákon, but lost his life at sea on his return voyage in 1248.

In the year of Haraldr Óláfsson's drowning, two prominent members of Clann Somhairle, Eóghan Mac Dubhghaill, Lord of Argyll, and his second cousin Dubhghall mac Ruaidhrí, travelled to Hákon in Norway and requested the title of king in the Hebrides. Hákon subsequently bestowed the title upon Eóghan, and in 1249, upon learning of Haraldr Óláfsson's death, Hákon sent Eóghan westward to take control of the Hebrides. In May 1249, Haraldr Óláfsson's brother, Rǫgnvaldr Óláfsson, formally succeeded to the kingship.

Simplified family tree concerning the patrilineal descendants of Guðrøðr Óláfsson, Haraldr Guðrøðarson's paternal great-grandfather. Except for Ívarr, only kings descended from Guðrøðr Óláfsson are shown.

Guðrøðr (died 1187)
Rǫgnvaldr (died 1229)	Ívarr	Óláfr (died 1237)
Guðrøðr (died 1231)	Haraldr (died 1248)	Rǫgnvaldr (died 1249)	Magnús (died 1265)
Haraldr (fl. 1249)

== Haraldr Guðrøðarson's ascension ==
Image a

Image b

Image c

Locations relating to Haraldr Guðrøðarson's life and times. Image a shows the British Isles in relation to Iceland and Norway. Image b illustrates specific locations associated with the Crovan dynasty in England, Ireland, and Scotland. Image c concerns Mann itself.

The thirteenth- to fourteenth-century Chronicle of Mann records that, on 30 May 1249, Rǫgnvaldr Óláfsson was slain in a meadow near the Church of the Holy Trinity at Rushen, and later buried at the Church of St Mary at Rushen. The chronicle names one of Rǫgnvaldr's killers as a certain knight named Ívarr, and identifies the others as the latter's followers. Immediately following Rǫgnvaldr's death, Haraldr Guðrøðarson makes his first appearance in the chronicle, as it records that he then seized the kingship.

The chronology of events surrounding Rǫgnvaldr's death suggests that Haraldr Guðrøðarson and Ívarr were allies. Moreover, a letter of Henry III, King of England, dated April 1256, further supports the likelihood of an alliance, as the letter commands Henry's men not to receive the Haraldr Guðrøðarson and Ívarr who "wickedly slew" Rǫgnvaldr. The identity of Ívarr is uncertain. His designation as a knight may indicate that he was an élite of some sort. One possibility is that he may have been a member of the Crovan dynasty, and possibly a descendant of Guðrøðr Óláfsson. Certainly, a man of the name is known to have been a son of Guðrøðr Óláfsson, although nothing more is known of him, and it is unlikely that a man born before 1187 would have been active in 1249. The chronicle makes no mention of the knight's ancestry, and this may be evidence that he was not related to the Crovan dynasty in any meaningful way. It is likely that he is identical to the "domino Yuor' de Mann" ("Lord Ívarr of Mann") who is recorded in one of Haraldr Óláfsson's charters of 1246. (Note: By the thirteenth century, the Latin term dominus increasingly referred to an individual's knightly status.)

Following Haraldr Guðrøðarson's takeover, the chronicle records that he then drove out all of the chiefs and nobles of the old regime who had been supporters of the deceased Haraldr Óláfsson, and then replaced them with men whom the latter had previously exiled.

An example of the chronicle's bias against the descendants of Rǫgnvaldr Guðrøðarson is one of the two miracle narratives preserved by this source. The story in question is about a miracle attributed to St Mary, which may have been incorporated into the chronicle in order to discredit the reign of Haraldr Guðrøðarson. Whatever the case, the story deals with an aged chieftain named Domnall, who is described as a close friend of Haraldr Óláfsson, and regarded by the latter as worthier than others. The chronicle relates how Domnall and his young son were forced to flee from Haraldr Guðrøðarson to the sanctuary of the Church of St Mary at Rushen. The latter, however, is stated to have tricked them into leaving the church-grounds, whereupon they were immediately seized. It was in this time of need, so the story says, that Domnall's prayers to St Mary were answered, and that it was through her divine intervention that he and his son escaped from their imprisonment. The chronicle states that Domnall himself recounted the story to the chronicle's compilers. The account itself seems to have been used as means to portray Haraldr Guðrøðarson as a distrustful oath-breaker, and thereby further discredit the line of Rǫgnvaldr Guðrøðarson; conversely, the connection between Haraldr Óláfsson and the divinely favoured Domnall may have been intended to imply legitimacy in regards to Óláfr's line. Although the identities of Domnall and his son are uncertain, there is reason to suspect that they are identical to Domhnall mac Raghnaill, the eponym of Clann Domhnaill, and his son, Aonghus Mór.

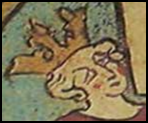
Image a

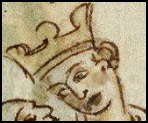
Image b

Haraldr Guðrøðarson dealt with the formidable Hákon Hákonarson, King of Norway (image a), and Henry III, King of England (image b).

Haraldr Guðrøðarson may have attempted to strengthen his hold on the kingdom by entering into negotiations with Henry; and was, for a time at least, regarded as a legitimate ruler by that English king, as a license of safe-passage granted by him, valid from 28 December 1249 to 29 September 1250, acknowledges Haraldr Guðrøðarson's kingship, and gives him free pass to travel to the English court.

== Forced exile ==
Haraldr Guðrøðarson's reign was not a long one. In 1250, the chronicle records that he was summoned by letter to the Norwegian royal court because Hákon was displeased at how Haraldr Guðrøðarson had wrongfully seized the kingship which was not his by right. The chronicle notes that the Norwegian king intended that Haraldr Guðrøðarson should never return to Mann, and he was consequently kept from returning to the island-kingdom. Nothing further is heard from him.

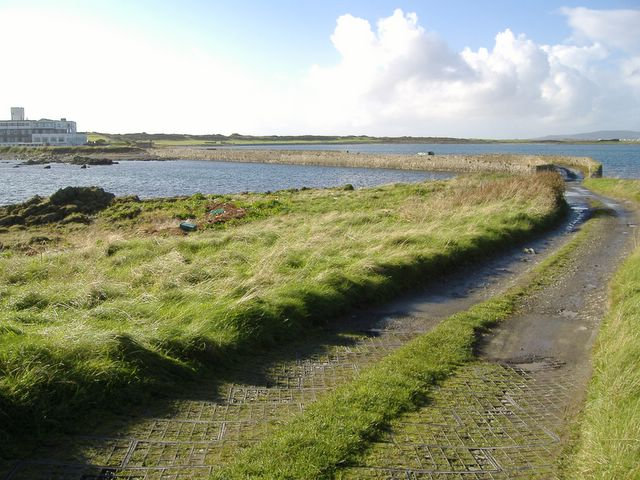
Looking south-west from St. Michael's Isle across the tidal causeway to mainland Mann.

In the same year, the chronicle records that Magnús Óláfsson—yet another son of Óláfr—and Eóghan arrived on Mann with a force of Norwegians. (Note: One of Eóghan's daughters is known to have been married to Magnús, at the time of the latter's death in 1265.) The exact intentions of the invaders are unknown for certain. It is possible that they may have intended to install Magnús as king. At the very least, Eóghan was likely looking for some form of compensation, as he had previously been forcefully dispossessed of his mainland Scottish lordship by Alexander II, King of Scots for his refusal to renounce his allegiance to Hákon. The chronicle states that the invaders made landfall at Ronaldsway, and entered into negotiations with the Manx people; although, when it was learned that Eóghan styled himself "King of the Isles" the Manxmen took offence and broke off all dialogue. The chronicle describes how Eóghan had his men form-up on St Michael's Isle, an island that was attached to Mann by a tidal causeway, and that the Manxmen formed-up on the mainland, on the beach opposite the island. When the tide began to recede, the chronicle states that Eóghan and those men closest to him boarded their ships, although much of his force remained stationed on the island. As evening drew near, the chronicle records that an accomplice of Ívarr led an attack upon the island and routed Eóghan's forces there. The next day, the chronicle states that the invading forces left the shores of Mann.

Ívarr's connection to the Manx attack on the invading forces of Eóghan and Magnús may suggest that there was still considerable opposition on Mann by adherents of Haraldr Guðrøðarson to the prospect of Magnús' kingship there. Two years later, the Chronicle of Mann and the fourteenth-century Chronicle of Lanercost record that Magnús returned to Mann and with the consent of the Manxmen began his reign. There are indications that opposition to Magnús, and thus possibly support of Haraldr Guðrøðarson, continued into the mid 1250s. For example, the chronicle records that Hákon bestowed upon Magnús the title of king in 1254; and further notes that, when Magnús' opponents heard of this bequeathment, they became dismayed and their hopes of overthrowing him gradually faded away. Furthermore, Henry's 1256 letter, which orders his men not to receive Haraldr Guðrøðarson and Ívarr, may indicate that the two were still alive and active at the time. Whatever the case, Magnús, the last reigning king of the Crovan dynasty, ruled unchallenged as King of Mann and the Isles until his death in 1265.

== Ancestry ==
Ancestors of Haraldr Guðrøðarson

16. Óláfr Guðrøðarson (died 1153)
8. Guðrøðr Óláfsson (died 1187)
17. Affraic inghean Fearghusa (Note: Haraldr Guðrøðarson's paternal great-great-grandfather, Óláfr Guðrøðarson, is known to have had at least two wives: Ingibjǫrg, daughter of Hákon Pálsson, Earl of Orkney, and Affraic, daughter of Fearghus, Lord of Galloway. It is most probable that Guðrøðr's mother was Affraic. Ingibjǫrg was likely Óláfr's first wife.)
4. Rǫgnvaldr Guðrøðarson (died 1229)
9. Sadb (Note: The identity of the mother of Rǫgnvaldr Guðrøðarson is uncertain, although the existing evidence points towards Sadb, a woman who is described as Rǫgnvaldr's mother in a Gaelic panegyric composed in his honour. Sadb's identity is otherwise unknown, although she is considered to have been an Irishwoman, and is likely to have been an unrecorded concubine of Rǫgnvaldr's father.)
2. Guðrøðr Rǫgnvaldsson (died 1231)
1. Haraldr Guðrøðarson (died 1249)

== Citations ==
Haraldr Guðrøðarson Crovan dynasty
Regnal titles
Preceded by Rǫgnvaldr Óláfsson	King of the Isles; 1249–1250	Succeeded by Magnús Óláfsson
