= Páll Bálkason =

Hebridean lord

Páll, son of Bálki
- Died: 1231; Isle of Lewis
- Opponent: Gofraid Donn
- Children: 1 son
- Parent: Bálki
- Relatives: Foster father of Leod

Páll, son of Bálki, or Paal Baalkeson, (Note: He name appears as Pol filius Boke (Latin) in the mediaeval Chronicle of Mann; as Paal Baccas in the 19th century Bannatyne manuscript; as Pol, son of Bok in late 18th century MacLeod tradition.) was a 13th-century Hebridean lord who was an ally of Olaf the Black, king of Mann and the Isles. He was long remembered in Gaelic tradition and is traditionally the progenitor of certain families with roots in the Hebrides. Páll is recorded as being a "sheriff" of Skye, a post which had earlier been held by another Páll, son of Bálki, who was possibly an ancestor. This earlier sheriff was said to have been a close friend of Godred II, King of Mann and the Isles.

== Background ==
Much of the contemporary knowledge of Páll comes from his appearances in the mediaeval Chronicle of Mann and later MacLeod tradition. Within the Chronicle of Mann he is named as Paul filius Boke, and is titled as a vicecomes of Skye. This title has usually been translated into English as "sheriff", since it is the regular form of "sheriff" in later times in Scotland. According to W.D.H. Sellar, it is more likely that vicecomes refers to a Norse title, such as syslumadh or armadhr (Gaelic: armann). His title appears to show that he was the official representative of the kings of Man on Skye. In later Gaelic tradition, Páll is portrayed as a "hermit"; it has been suggested that this description may actually refer to this Norse title.

The post of "sheriff" had at one time been earlier been held by another Páll, son of Bálki who was possibly an ancestor of Páll. (Note: Early 20th-century historian W.C. Mackenzie thought the earlier Páll could have been Páll's father. R.C. MacLeod thought he was likely Páll's grandfather.) This earlier sheriff was said to have been a close friend of Godred II of Mann and the Isles. The early 20th-century historian W.C. Mackenzie related how Somerled had his sights set on becoming king in the Hebrides; his own son, Dugald, was paraded through the Hebrides and proclaimed king, with the local chieftains called upon to support his claim. Most of the chieftains, however, refused to give their support, including Páll's predecessor, Páll, son of Bálki. Upon refusing to swear his allegiance to Dugald, this Páll, son of Bálki fled to the Isle of Man, where he alerted the king of Somerled's treachery. Godred II immediately sent a fleet to the Hebrides to crush the insurrection; however, Somerled was waiting for him, and the opposing fleets met in battle. Both sides fought into the night; by morning Godred II and Somerled agreed to a truce and agreed to divide the Hebrides between them. Somerled retained the islands south of Ardnamurchan and Godred II retained those to the north. Mackenzie stated that this treaty dates to the year 1156 and marks the date on which the South Isles passed permanently from the dominion of the Kings of Mann.

== Sources ==
=== Chronicle of Mann ===
The Chronicle of Mann describes how Páll was an ally of Olaf the Black, brother to Reginald, King of Mann and the Isles. The chronicle relates that Reginald gave Olaf the Outer Hebridean Isle of Lewis. The island was, however, thinly populated and the land was mostly unfit for cultivation. After a while Olaf determined that he could no longer support himself and his followers; he then asked his brother for further lands. Reginald then had Olaf seized and sent to William of Scotland, where he was kept imprisoned for almost seven years. On the seventh year the king of Scots died and Olaf was subsequently released. Olaf returned to his brother on Mann, and then set off on a pilgrimage; upon his return, the two brothers got on amicably, with Reginald setting up a marriage between Olaf and Lauon, sister to his own wife. After the marriage between Olaf and Lauon the couple proceeded to Lewis, where they lived. Some time later, Reginald, Bishop of the Isles (and nephew to Olaf), the island. The bishop disapproved of Olaf's marriage on the grounds that Olaf had a concubine who was a cousin of Lauon. A synod was assembled the marriage was nullified. Olaf later married Christina, daughter of Fearchar, Earl of Ross. The nullification of the marriage enraged Lauon's sister, the Queen of the Isles. In bitterness, the queen sought to sow discord between Olaf and her husband. The queen wrote secretly to her son, Godred, who was on Skye. The letter was written in the king's name; it ordered Godred to seize and kill Olaf. Godred then gathered a force on Skye and proceeded to Lewis where he laid waste to most of the island. Olaf, however, managed to narrowly escape with a few men and fled to the protection of his father-in-law.

The chronicle describes Páll as having power and energy which "were felt throughout the whole kingdom of the Isles". It states that Páll refused to consent to the murder of Olaf and that he fled Godred to reside with Olaf who was then safe under the protection of the Earl of Ross. Páll and Olaf then entered into a pact of friendship; together they went to Skye, where they learned Godred was staying on a certain island called "the island of Saint Columba", without much protection or many attendants. The two lords then gathered as many men as possible and under the cover of darkness, they brought five ships from the closest point of the shore, which was about two furlongs from the island. When morning came, Godred and his few followers were shocked to find themselves surrounded by enemies. At nine o'clock, Olaf and Páll attacked the island with their full force; every one of Godred's men who could not find protection within the grounds of a church were summarily put to death. Godred was seized, blinded and castrated, against Olaf's wishes. The chronicle states that he was unable to prevent the mutilation and torture of his nephew on account of Páll's predecessor, Bálki. The chronicle dates the event to the year 1223. This act is confirmed in contemporary Icelandic Annals, which also state that despite his injuries, Godred was appointed by Haakon, king of Norway, as king in the Hebrides. Not long afterwards, Godred had Páll killed in the Hebrides.

=== Hákonar saga Hákonarsonar ===
Páll is mentioned within the 13th century Icelandic saga Hákonar saga Hákonarsonar. He is recorded as being active in the year 1223; and his death is recorded in the year 1231. The saga also states that at the time of his death, he had a son, Bálki, who was by that time a grown warrior.

=== History of the MacDonalds ===
The story of Godred Donn's blinding and castration was long remembered in Gaelic tradition. An account of it appears in the 17th-century manuscript history, History of the MacDonalds, written by the Sleat senachie, Hugh MacDonald. This account is, however, quite garbled. It dates the event about 80 years out of sync. This account states that "Olay" and Somerled "killed Godfrey Du, or the Black, by putting out his eyes, which was done by the hermit MacPoke, because Godfrey Du had killed his father formerly". Sellar noted that for MacDonald's "Olay" and "Olay the Red", one should read Olaf the Black; for "Godfrey Du", one should read Godred Donn; and for "the hermit MacPoke", one should read Páll, son of Bálki.

=== MacLeod tradition circa 1767 ===
In 1767, a memorial was drawn up for the chief of Clan MacLeod, which contained a traditional account of the clan. This tradition states that Leod was fostered by Pol, son of Bok, who was sheriff of Skye. Pol gave Leod Harris and Leod later married the daughter of McCraild Armuinn and doing so received estates on Skye.

=== Bannatyne manuscript ===
The Bannatyne manuscript dates to about the year 1830. Páll appears in this manuscript as "Paal Baccas". He is stated to have owned the Skye estates of Sleat, Trotternish, Waternish, and Snizort; as well as Outer Hebridean Harris. The manuscript also notes that during this era, the northern part of North Uist was considered part of the lands of Harris, and that he owned this northern part of Uist as well. The lands he held had originally been ruled by several Gaelic and Norse families, though they were since then won by his ancestors. In consequence, the local populations acknowledged his authority over themselves. The manuscript also states that Paal Baccas had a natural son; when Paal Baccas died in 1231, he did not leave his lands to this son, and instead left all of his estates to Leod—eponymous ancestor of the MacLeods. According to the manuscript, no one opposed Leod's claim to these lands.

== Location of the "island of Saint Columba" ==
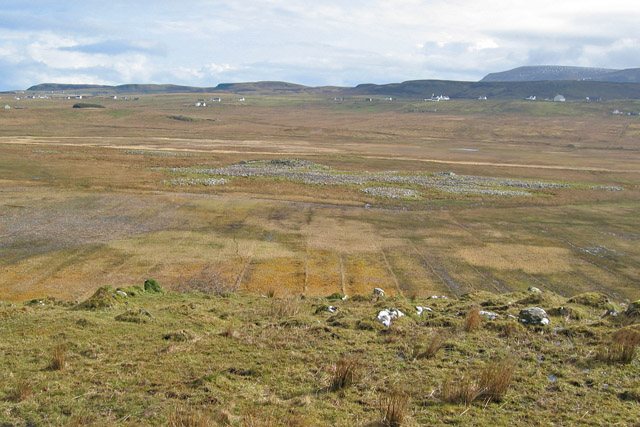
Eilean Chaluim Chille, on Skye. The (former) island sits in a now drained loch. The island was long associated with a man now considered to be Páll, son of Bálki.

It has sometimes been stated that the "Saint Columba's Isle" mentioned to in the Chronicle of Mann, may in fact represent the Inner Hebridean island of Iona, which is known in Scottish Gaelic as Ì Chaluim Chille. There have been several other islands suggested—all of which are located on, or near, Skye. One such location is the "Island of St. Colm", near Portree at Skeabost; suggested by historian Alick Morrison. Sellar, however, noted that Morrison gave no evidence in support of this location. Another proposed location is the "Island of St Columba", which is situated in the middle of the river Snizort; and which is located only few hundred yards from the sea. This island was for a time, the site of a mediaeval cathedral; it is also the site of the traditional burial grounds of the MacNeacails of Scorrybreac. Sellar proposed another location, which he considered to be a much more likely candidate for the isle where Olaf and Páll attacked Godred Donn. This was Eilean Chaluim Chille, at Kilmuir, Skye. This island was originally in the middle of Loch Chaluim Chille, located at grid reference NG37706885; though the long was drained in the 18th century. Sellar asserted that this location fit perfectly with the location described in the Chronicle of Mann. He also noted that the island was associated in local tradition with a man who is now thought to represent Páll.

== Legacy ==
Páll has long been remembered in Gaelic tradition. One tradition, still recounted in the early 20th century in the vicinity of Kilmuir, concerned a man described as Fear Caisteal Eilean Chaluim Chille ("the man of the castle of Eilean Chaluim Chille")—a man considered to represent the historical Páll. The Bannatyne manuscript states that Paal Baccas had a natural son, from whom descended a family that held the island of Berneray and other lands on Harris under the MacLeods. It continues that the family was once powerful and numerous, but it fell into decline until only a few remained. The manuscript names this family as Clan Vic Phaich and states that they prided themselves in their descent from Paal Baccas. This Berneray family is today surnamed MacKillop; yet they are known in Scottish Gaelic as MacPhàic. (Note: The surname MacKillop is an Anglicised form of the Gaelic MacFhilib; in English this Gaelic name means "son of Philip".) Matheson stated that their traditional Gaelic name presumably referred to Bálki, father of Páll; or perhaps to a son of Páll who was also named Bálki. Matheson proposed that the MacPhails, originally from the Sand district on North Uist, and those from Carloway on Lewis, derived their surname from Páll. There is a township on the northern tip of the Island called Baile Mhicphail (Macphail's village).

The four relevant pedigrees concerning the ancestry of Leod (click to enlarge).

According to Matheson, the MacLeods are male-line descendants of Páll's father. Matheson proposed that three of the four genealogies relevant to Leod's ancestry (pictured right), show that Leod was the grandson of Bálki; that the names Raice, Raoige, Raisi were garbled Gaelic forms of the Old Norse name Bálki. (Note: This name was originally a byname, related to the Norwegian balk ("confusion"), or from the Old English balca ("balk").) Matheson added more weight to his argument by noting that the 17th century Gaelic poet Duncan Macrae of Inverinate, referred within a song to the MacLeod chief Roderick MacLeod of Dunvegan (chief 1693–1699) as éighre Shìol Phàic (the "heir of the seed of Bálki"). Matheson speculated that if Leod, founder of Clan MacLeod, was the nephew of Páll, then this may help explain why MacLeod tradition states that Paal Baccas left his estates to Leod, instead of his own (illegitimate) son. Matheson's proposal was, however, met with considerable criticism from his peers. The three Gaelic names singled out by Matheson are not considered to represent Bálki. Sellar proposed the names represented the Gaelic Raingce; while A.P. MacLeod proposed they equated the very rare Old Norse name Ragi. (Note: The Old Norse Ragi is derived from the Old West Norse ragr ("cowardly", "homosexual").) The current consensus is that Matheson could not have been correct in his proposed relationship between Leod and Páll's father; meaning that Macrae of Inverinate's "heir of the seed of Bálki" must have referred to a non-male-line descent.

== Bibliography ==
Notes

References

- Munch, Peter Andreas (1874). Chronica regvm Manniæ et insvlarvm: The Chronicle of Man and the Sudreys (1874 ed.). Douglas: Printed for the Manx society. - Total pages: 266
