= Rǫgnvaldr Óláfsson (died 1249) =

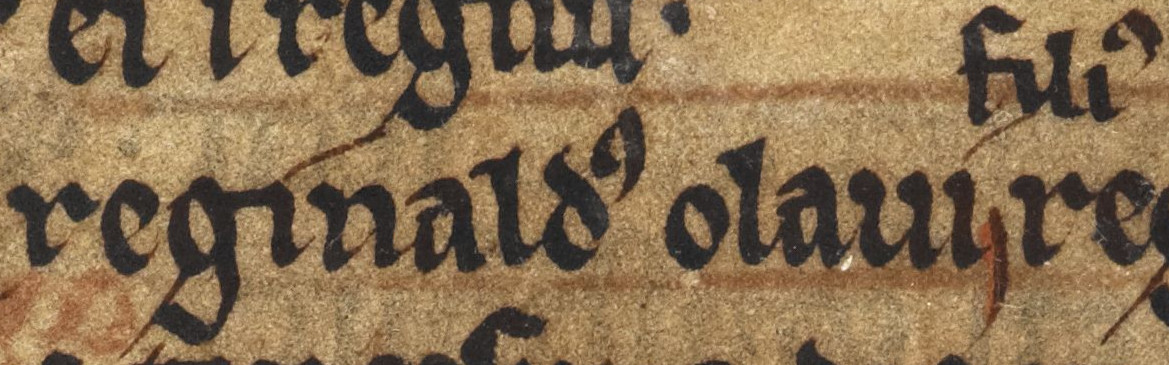
- Rǫgnvaldr Óláfsson's name as it appears on folio 47r of British Library Cotton Julius A VII (the Chronicle of Mann): "Reginaldus Olavi filius".

King of Mann and the Isles
- Reign: 6 May 1249 – 30 May 1249
- Predecessor: Haraldr Óláfsson
- Successor: Haraldr Guðrøðarson
- Died: 30 May 1249
- Burial: Rushen Abbey
- House: Crovan dynasty
- Father: Óláfr Guðrøðarson
- Mother: Cairistíona inghean Fearchair

Rǫgnvaldr Óláfsson (died 30 May 1249) (Note: Since the 1990s, academics have accorded Rǫgnvaldr various personal names in English secondary sources: Ragnall, Ragnvald, Ranald, Reginald, Rognvald, Rögnvaldr, and Rǫgnvaldr. Likewise, academics have accorded Rǫgnvaldr various patronyms in English secondary sources: Ragnall mac Amlaíb Duib, Reginald Olafsson, and Rǫgnvaldr Óláfsson.) was a mid-thirteenth-century King of Mann and the Isles who was assassinated after a reign of less than a month. As a son of Óláfr Guðrøðarson, King of Mann and the Isles, Rǫgnvaldr Óláfsson was a member of the Crovan dynasty. When his father died in 1237, the kingship was assumed by Haraldr Óláfsson. The latter was lost at sea late in 1248, and the following year Rǫgnvaldr Óláfsson succeeded him as king.

Only weeks after gaining the kingship, Rǫgnvaldr Óláfsson was slain by a knight named Ívarr and his accomplices. The kingship was then seized by Haraldr Guðrøðarson, Rǫgnvaldr Óláfsson's first cousin once removed, suggesting that the killers and the new king had colluded together. The assassination, therefore, appears to have been a continuation of the vicious family feud that had engulfed the Crovan dynasty since the late twelfth century, when Rǫgnvaldr Óláfsson's father and Haraldr Guðrøðarson's grandfather first contested the kingship of the Isles.

== Background ==
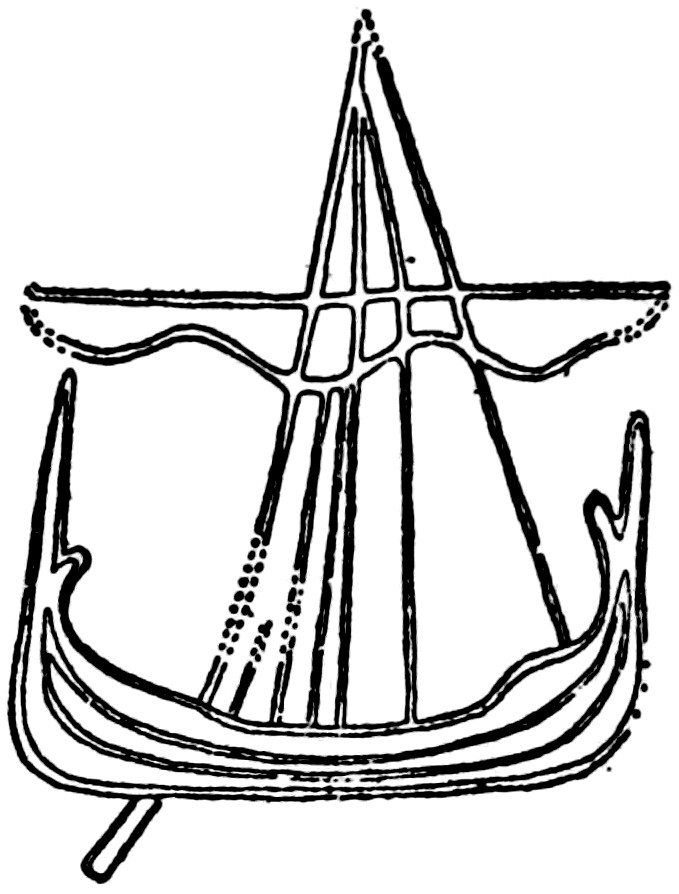
Detail from Maughold IV, a Manx runestone displaying a contemporary sailing vessel. The power of the kings of the Isles laid in their armed galley-fleets.

Rǫgnvaldr Óláfsson was one of several sons of Óláfr Guðrøðarson, King of Mann and the Isles, and thus a member of the Crovan dynasty. Although Óláfr is known to have had two wives, and no contemporaneous source names the mother of his children, there is evidence suggesting that their mother may have been Óláfr's second wife: Cairistíona, daughter of Fearchar mac an tSagairt, Earl of Ross. Specifically, the thirteenth- to fourteenth-century Chronicle of Mann states that, when Óláfr died in 1237, he was succeeded by his fourteen-year-old son, Haraldr Óláfsson. This source therefore dates Haraldr Óláfsson's birth to 1223, about the time when Óláfr and Fearchar allied themselves in marriage. The ancestral origins of Fearchar's family are unknown, although he appears to have been a native of eastern Ross. The Norse-Gaelic Crovan dynasty, founded by Rǫgnvaldr Óláfsson's paternal great-great-grandfather, held royal power in the Isles from the late eleventh to the mid thirteenth century. This realm was known in Old Norse as Suðreyjar, a term that means "Southern Islands", in reference to the Hebrides and Mann. Various documentary sources, in the form of contemporary chronicles and sagas, reveal that during the dynasty's tenure of power, the kings of the Isles tended to acknowledge the authority of the kings of Norway.

From the later twelfth- to the mid thirteenth century, the dynasty suffered from bitter factionalism and vicious kin-strife. Rǫgnvaldr Óláfsson's father, Óláfr, was a younger son of Guðrøðr Óláfsson, King of Dublin and the Isles. According to the chronicle, before his death in 1187, Guðrøðr Óláfsson instructed that Óláfr should succeed to the kingship. The latter was only a child at the time, however, and the Islesmen instead inaugurated Rǫgnvaldr Guðrøðarson, Guðrøðr Óláfsson's eldest albeit illegitimate son. As the first quarter of the thirteenth century began to wane, contentions between the half-brothers broke out into outright war. By the turn of the first quarter of the century, Óláfr managed to put aside the wife that Rǫgnvaldr Guðrøðarson had assigned him; and afterwards married Cairistíona, thereby gaining her father's military assistance. As time wore on, Óláfr gained the upper-hand in the struggle, and at one point had Rǫgnvaldr Guðrøðarson's son, Guðrøðr Dond, blinded and castrated. The bitter conflict between the half-brothers ended with Rǫgnvaldr Guðrøðarson's treacherous death in 1229. For a brief period in 1230/1231, Óláfr co-ruled the kingdom with Guðrøðr Dond. When the latter was slain in 1231, Óláfr ruled the entire kingdom without any internal opposition until his own death in 1237.

The main documentary source for the kings of the Crovan dynasty is the Chronicle of Mann, the only contemporary indigenous narrative-source concerning these men. The source itself survives in the form of a fourteenth-century Latin manuscript, which is in turn a copy of a chronicle probably first commissioned and composed during the reign of Magnús Óláfsson, King of Mann and the Isles. About fifteen percent of the chronicle is devoted to the strife between the half-brothers, and much of the rest of this source deals with the after-effects of the conflict. Although the chronicle's account of the half-brothers' struggle appears to be somewhat neutral, its treatment of their descendants is clearly slanted in favour of Óláfr's sons. In fact, it was only during the reign of Óláfr's son Magnús, that the former's sons finally overcame Rǫgnvaldr Guðrøðarson's descendants once and for all. The chronicle, therefore, may have been composed to further legitimise king's descended from Óláfr. In consequence, even the chronicle's claim that Óláfr's father had chosen him as his successor may be suspect.

Simplified pedigree of the Crovan dynasty depicting the degree of kinship between Rǫgnvaldr and contemporaneous members of the family.

Guðrøðr (died 1187)
Rǫgnvaldr (died 1229)	Ívarr	Óláfr (died 1237)
Guðrøðr Dond (died 1231)	Haraldr (died 1248)	Rǫgnvaldr (died 1249)	Magnús (died 1265)
Haraldr (fl. 1249)

== Ascension and assassination ==
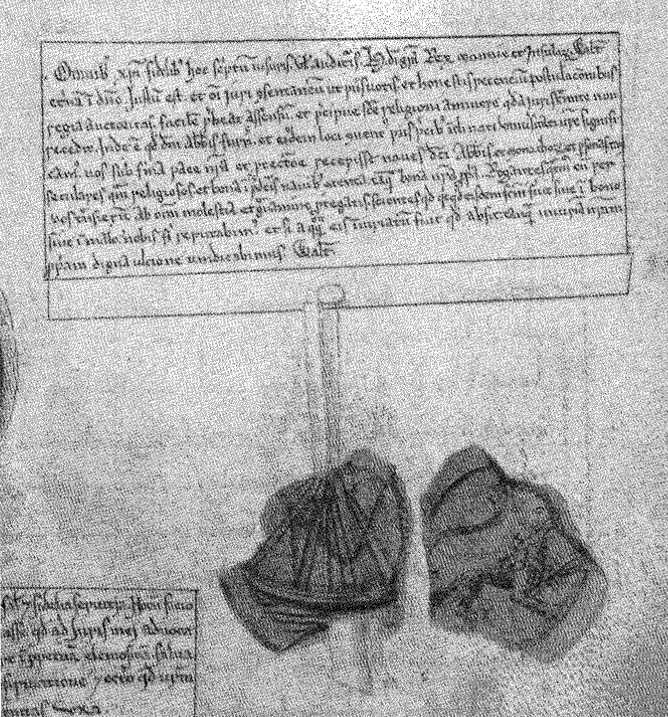
Seventeenth-century illustration of a charter and seal of Haraldr Óláfsson, Rǫgnvaldr Óláfsson's brother and royal predecessor. (Note: The original seal and charter were destroyed in a fire at the Cottonian Library in the first half of the eighteenth century. The seal shows a galley on one side and a lion on the other. The galley is similar to that shown on the Hedin Cross.)

Having succeeded his father, the chronicle reveals that Haraldr Óláfsson was soon ousted from power by representatives of Hákon Hákonarson, King of Norway. After unsuccessfully repulsing these men, Haraldr Óláfsson voyaged to Norway, where he stayed for about three years, and thus reconciled himself with Hákon, who in turn reinstalled him as king in the Isles. In 1247, the thirteenth-century Hákonar saga Hákonarsonar states that Haraldr Óláfsson again journeyed to Norway, where he married Hákon's daughter, Cecilía, in the winter of 1247/1248. On the newly-weds' return voyage in the autumn of 1248, the chronicle and saga report that their ship foundered off Shetland, with all aboard lost.

Upon learning of the catastrophe, Hákon immediately directed Eóghan Mac Dubhghaill to temporarily take up the kingship of the Isles on his behalf. According to the Chronicle of Mann, Rǫgnvaldr Óláfsson assumed the kingship of the Isles on 6 May 1249. This could mean that he and Eóghan shared a degree of authority in the Isles. In any case, Rǫgnvaldr Óláfsson's reign was an extremely short one, lasting hardly a month, as the chronicle states that he was slain on 30 May 1249. (Note: The Chronicle of Lanercost reports that Rǫgnvaldr Óláfsson reigned twenty-seven days, from 6 May to 1 July—the latter date is apparently a mistake for 1 June.) Rǫgnvaldr Óláfsson's body was then interred at Rushen Abbey, the site of his father's final resting place. (Note: Rǫgnvaldr Óláfsson's younger brother, Magnús, was also buried at Rushen Abbey.) Following the killing, the chronicle reports that the kingship was seized by Haraldr Guðrøðarson, a grandson of Rǫgnvaldr Guðrøðarson.

Although the chronicle names Rǫgnvaldr Óláfsson's killers as a knight named Ívarr and his followers, the precise identity of Ívarr is uncertain. One man bearing the same name was Rǫgnvaldr Óláfsson's paternal uncle, Ívarr Guðrøðarson. Although the latter is noted by the chronicle, in an entry concerning his father's demise, nothing more is known of him, and it is unlikely that someone born before 1187 would have been active in 1249. The chronicle's Latin designation of "milite" ("knight") to Rǫgnvaldr Óláfsson's killer may be evidence that he was a member of the elite. The fact that this Ívarr is not accorded a patronym of any sort, however, suggests that he was not a member of a prominent family (such as the Crovan dynasty). In fact, he appears to be identical to the "domino Yuor' de Mann" ("Lord Ívarr of Mann"), who witnessed a Latin charter of Haraldr Óláfsson in 1246. (Note: By the thirteenth century, the Latin term dominus increasingly referred to an individual's knightly status.) Ívarr's identity aside, the chronology of events surrounding Rǫgnvaldr Óláfsson's killing suggests that Haraldr Guðrøðarson and Ívarr were allies. A particular letter of Henry III, King of England, dated April 1256, commanding his men not to receive Haraldr Guðrøðarson and Ívarr—the men whom the letter states "wickedly slew" Rǫgnvaldr Óláfsson—further evidences an alliance between the two.

In light of Ívarr's possible collusion with Haraldr Guðrøðarson, the slaying of Rǫgnvaldr Óláfsson may be evidence that the continuing strife between the rival branches descended from the half-brothers, Rǫgnvaldr Guðrøðarson and Óláfr, continued well into the mid thirteenth century. In fact, the killing is the last recorded example of regicide in the Norse-Gaelic realm, and may partly evidence the Europeanisation of the peripheral regions of the British Isles during the twelfth- and thirteenth centuries. As it turned out, the reign of Rǫgnvaldr Óláfsson's successor was short-lived, since Haraldr Guðrøðarson was recalled to Norway in 1250, for having unjustly seized the kingship. Once in Norway, the latter was detained from returning to the Isles, and is not heard of again. Within two years, Rǫgnvaldr Óláfsson's brother, Magnús, was installed in the kingship. The latter reigned until his death in 1265, and was the last member of the Crovan dynasty to rule as king in the Isles. An after-effect of the inter-dynastic warring within the Crovan dynasty was the partitioning of the kingdom between rival factions. For example, from about 1187 to 1226, and for a brief period in 1229, the kingdom was divided between the half-brothers; and for a brief period in 1230/1231 it was divided between Óláfr and his nephew, Guðrøðr Dond. Although Haraldr Óláfsson appears to have reigned over a united kingdom, the years between his death and the installation of Magnús in 1252 is a murky period indeed, and it is possible that the kingdom was divided between rival factions during this brief span of years. Rǫgnvaldr Óláfsson was evidently survived by a daughter, Maria. In 1305, a grandson of this woman pursued a claim to Mann.

== Ancestry ==
Ancestors of Rǫgnvaldr Óláfsson (died 1249)

16. Guðrøðr Crovan, King of Dublin and the Isles (died 1095)
8. Óláfr Guðrøðarson, King of the Isles (died 1153)
4. Guðrøðr Óláfsson, King of Dublin and the Isles (died 1187)
18. Fearghus, Lord of Galloway (died 1161)
9. Affraic inghean Fearghusa
19. unnamed (Note: Affraic's mother, whose name is unknown, was an illegitimate daughter of Henry I, King of England (died 1135).)
2. Óláfr Guðrøðarson, King of the Isles (died 1237)
20. Muirchertach Mac Lochlainn, High King of Ireland (died 1166)
10. Niall Mac Lochlainn, King of Cineál Eoghain (died 1176)
5. Fionnghuala Nic Lochlainn
1. Rǫgnvaldr Óláfsson, King of Mann and the Isles (died 1249)
6. Fearchar mac an tSagairt, Earl of Ross (died c.1251)
3. Cairistíona inghean Fearchair

== Citations ==
Regnal titles
Preceded by Haraldr Óláfsson	King of Mann and the Isles; 1249	Succeeded by Haraldr Guðrøðarson
