= Haraldr Óláfsson =

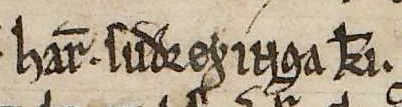
- Haraldr's name and title as it appears on folio 115r of AM 45 fol (Codex Frisianus): "Haralldi Suðreyinnga konvngi".

King of Mann and the Isles
- Reign: 1237–1248
- Predecessor: Óláfr Guðrøðarson
- Successor: Rǫgnvaldr Óláfsson
- Born: 1222 or 1223
- Died: 1248; Sumburgh Head
- Spouse: Cecilía of Norway
- House: Crovan dynasty
- Father: Óláfr Guðrøðarson

Haraldr Óláfsson (born 1223 or 1224; died 1248) was a thirteenth-century King of Mann and the Isles, and a member of the Crovan dynasty. (Note: Since the 1990s, academics have accorded Haraldr various patronymic names in English secondary sources: Arailt mac Amhlaíbh, Aralt mac Amlaíb Duib, Harald Olafsson, Harald Óláfsson, Harald Olavsson, and Haraldr Óláfsson.) He was one of several sons of Óláfr Guðrøðarson, King of the Isles, although the identity of his mother is uncertain. When his father died in 1237, Haraldr succeeded to the kingship as a fourteen-year-old, and held the kingship for about a decade afterwards.

Early in his reign, Haraldr was forced to contend with an apparent coup perpetrated by a kinsman and perhaps an otherwise unknown younger brother. Following this, Haraldr was then ejected from Mann by envoys of his father's overlord, Hákon Hákonarson, King of Norway, who probably took action against Haraldr because the former had refused to render him homage. Unable to overcome Hákon's supporters in the Isles, Haraldr eventually submitted to Hákon in Norway, and remained there for about two or three years before being restored in the Isles.

Unlike his immediate royal predecessors, who appear to have favoured the title rex insularum, Haraldr appears to have preferred rex mannie et insularum. Three charters from Haraldr's reign are known, two of which are recorded to have borne a waxen seal, depicting a galley on one side and a lion on the other. Haraldr reigned during a period of competing claims to overlordship of the Isles by the English, Norwegian, and Scottish Crowns. Like his father before him, and a younger brother after him, Haraldr was knighted by Henry III, King of England. The act itself brought Haraldr closer within the orbit of the English Crown. Late in 1247, however, Haraldr returned to Norway and married Hákon's daughter, Cecilía, and thereby bound himself closer to the Norwegian Crown. Whilst attempting to return to the Isles in the autumn of 1248, the newly-wed's ship was lost at sea south of Shetland in a tidal race known as Sumburgh Roost. News of Haraldr's demise appears to have reached Mann by the spring of 1249, whereupon his younger brother, Rǫgnvaldr, succeeded to the kingship.

Haraldr was evidently a popular and capable king who appears to have garnered much of his support from the Hebridean portion of his realm. His untimely death, however, led to the continuation of the vicious kin-strife which had wracked the Crovan dynasty during his father's floruit. The chaos brought about by Haraldr's demise appears to have contributed to the invasion of Argyll, and near conquest of the Hebrides, by Alexander II, King of Scotland.

== Background ==
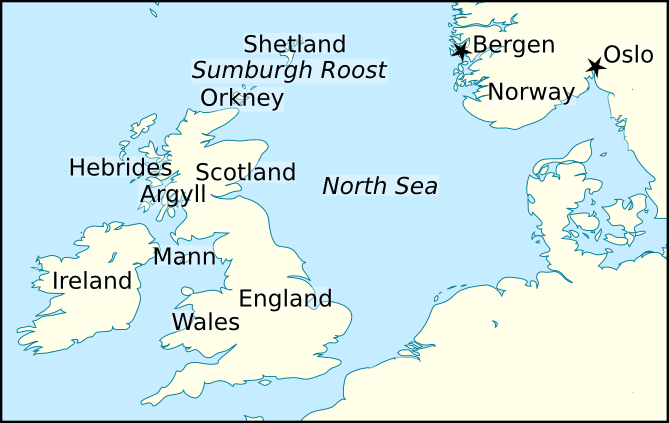
Locations relating to Haraldr.

Haraldr was a son of Óláfr Guðrøðarson, King of the Isles, and a member of the Crovan dynasty. The identity of Haraldr's mother is less certain. Óláfr is known to have had two wives. His first marriage was to "Lauon", a woman who was likely a member of Clann Somhairle, possibly a daughter of either Ruaidhrí mac Raghnaill or Domhnall mac Raghnaill, or else a daughter of their father, Raghnall mac Somhairle. Óláfr's second wife was Cairistíona, daughter of Fearchar mac an tSagairt. Although no contemporaneous source names Haraldr's mother, the thirteenth- to fourteenth-century Chronicle of Mann states that Óláfr died in 1237, and specifies that Haraldr was fourteen-years-old at the time. This would place his birth in about 1222 or 1223, at about the time that Óláfr married his second wife, indicating that either woman could have been Haraldr's mother.

Haraldr reigned during an apparent lull in an ongoing and vicious struggle over the kingship fought between two rival branches of the Crovan dynasty. This kin-strife had its origins in the late twelfth century, on the death of Haraldr's paternal grandfather, Guðrøðr Óláfsson, King of Dublin and the Isles, after which the king was succeeded by Rǫgnvaldr Guðrøðarson. Although the latter was Guðrøðr Óláfsson's eldest son, and had the support of the Islesmen, Rǫgnvaldr Guðrøðarson's mother was an uncanonical wife or concubine. Haraldr's father, on the other hand, was the product of canonically recognised marriage, and may well have been Guðrøðr Óláfsson's chosen successor. After a period of imprisonment, Rǫgnvaldr had Óláfr marry Lauon, the sister of his own wife. Óláfr, however, managed to have the union nullified, and married Cairistíona. Tensions between the half-brothers turned to outright warfare in the 1220s, in which Rǫgnvaldr's son, Guðrøðr Dond, was captured and mutilated by Óláfr. Rǫgnvaldr was slain battling Óláfr in 1229, after which the latter gained complete control of the kingdom. In the 1230s, during a period of heightened tensions between the Norwegian and Scottish realms, Óláfr and Guðrøðr Dond temporarily shared control of the Crovan dynasty's partitioned realm. When the latter was killed in 1231, Óláfr assumed control of the entire kingdom, and ruled it peacefully until his own death.

Simplified pedigree of the Crovan dynasty depicting the degree of kinship between Haraldr and contemporaneous members of the family.

Guðrøðr (died 1187)
Rǫgnvaldr (died 1229)	Óláfr (died 1237)
Guðrøðr Dond (died 1231)	Haraldr (died 1248)	Rǫgnvaldr (died 1249)	Magnús (died 1265)
Haraldr (fl. 1249)

Haraldr also ruled during a period of competing claims to the overlordship of the Isles, a region comprising the Hebrides and Mann, known in the Norse world as Suðreyjar (the "Southern Islands") due to its geographical position in relation to Norway itself. Since the reign of Magnús berfœttr, King of Norway, a king who conquered Orkney, the Isles, and possibly Dublin before his death in 1103, the Norwegian Crown appears to have claimed ultimate authority in the Isles. In fact, on several occasions during the reigns of Haraldr's royal predecessors, leading Islesmen sought recognition and protection from Norwegian monarchs. The ruler of Norway during Haraldr's floruit was Hákon Hákonarson, King of Norway, a formidable ruler who spent the latter part of his reign focused on foreign policy and strengthening royal authority throughout far-flung Norse colonies such as the Isles. At the same time the Scottish Crown, in the person of Alexander II, King of Scotland, consolidated control over Scotland's western seaboard, and moved to extend Scottish influence further into the Isles. Meanwhile, Henry III, King of England also had an interest in the Isles, and worked to bring the Crovan dynasty closer under the orbit of the English Crown.

== Accession and overlordship ==
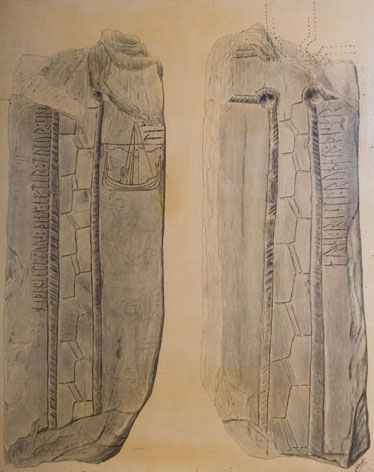
Image a

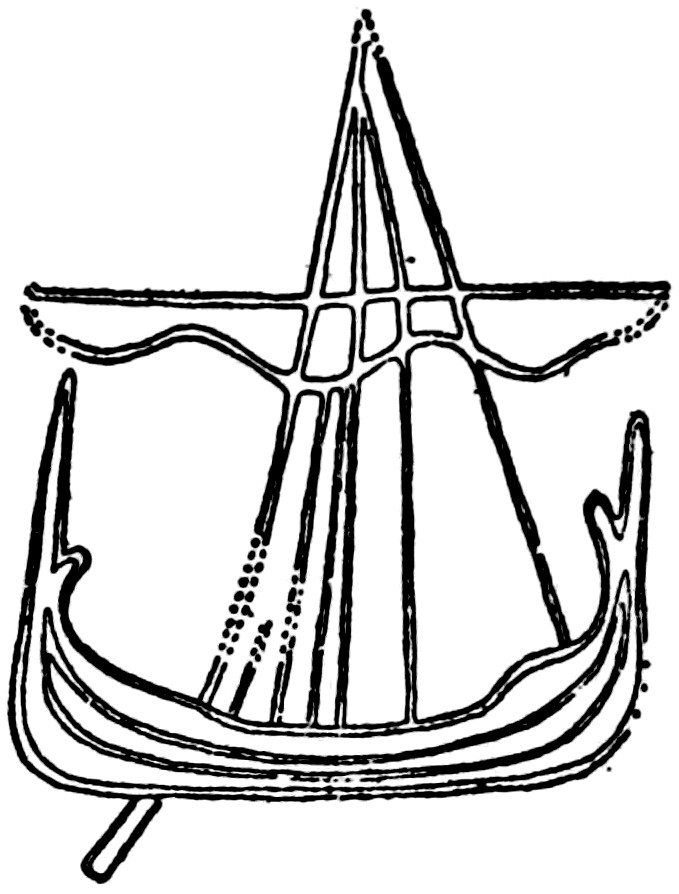
Image b

Maughold IV (image a; detail, image b), a Manx runestone displaying a contemporary sailing vessel. The power of the kings of the Isles laid in their armed galley-fleets. (Note: The inscription of the vessel may date to about the time of the Crovan dynasty, possibly from about the eleventh- to the thirteenth century. The vessel appears to be similar to those that appear on seals borne by members of the dynasty.)

After his father's death, Haraldr succeeded to the kingship. Unlike the reign of his father, who temporarily ruled a partitioned kingdom, and endured years of near catastrophic kin-strife, Haraldr appears to have ruled a whole kingdom, and his kingship does not seem to have suffered from serious dynastic discord. Haraldr's young age at the time of his accession, and the fact that he had a potential rival in the person of Haraldr Guðrøðarson, suggests that Haraldr had been designated successor during his father's lifetime. Not long after his accession, the Chronicle of Mann records that he sailed into the Hebridean portion of the kingdom, and left a kinsman named Lochlann as governor on Mann. Lochlann's tenure on the island led to factional strife, and when Haraldr made his return the following spring, the chronicle states that Lochlann fled the island for Wales, taking with him his foster-son, Guðrøðr Óláfsson. There, somewhere along the northern Welsh coast, the chronicle claims that their ship was lost, with Lochlann and his foster-son amongst the dead. Quite why Lochlann was compelled to flee his sovereign is uncertain. The chronicle states that a friend of Haraldr had been slain in the uprising quelled by Lochlann, possibly indicate that the latter fled in fear of the king. Another possibility is that Lochlann led a coalition opposed to Haraldr. Quite why Lochlann chose to Wales as his destination is also unknown, although the Crovan dynasty certainly had diplomatic and familial connections with the Welsh. In fact, a transaction between Llywelyn ap Gruffudd and Ralph de Mortimer that concerns the lands of Maelienydd and Gwerthrynion, and appears to date to 1241, makes note of a witness named "Godredo filio regis Mannie". The precise identity of this man is uncertain. One possibility is that he is identical to Lochlann's foster-son. If the chronicle is in error in its account of the maritime demise of Guðrøðr Óláfsson, and he is indeed identical to the like-named Manx prince on record in Wales, his activities outside the kingdom of his forefathers may have been a consequence of the troubles following the Haraldr's accession. The chronicle's account of the flight to Wales may, therefore, reveal that Lochlann tried and failed to replace Haraldr with an otherwise unknown younger son of Óláfr. If so, the episode would appear to be yet another example of the Crovan dynasty enduring internal strife.

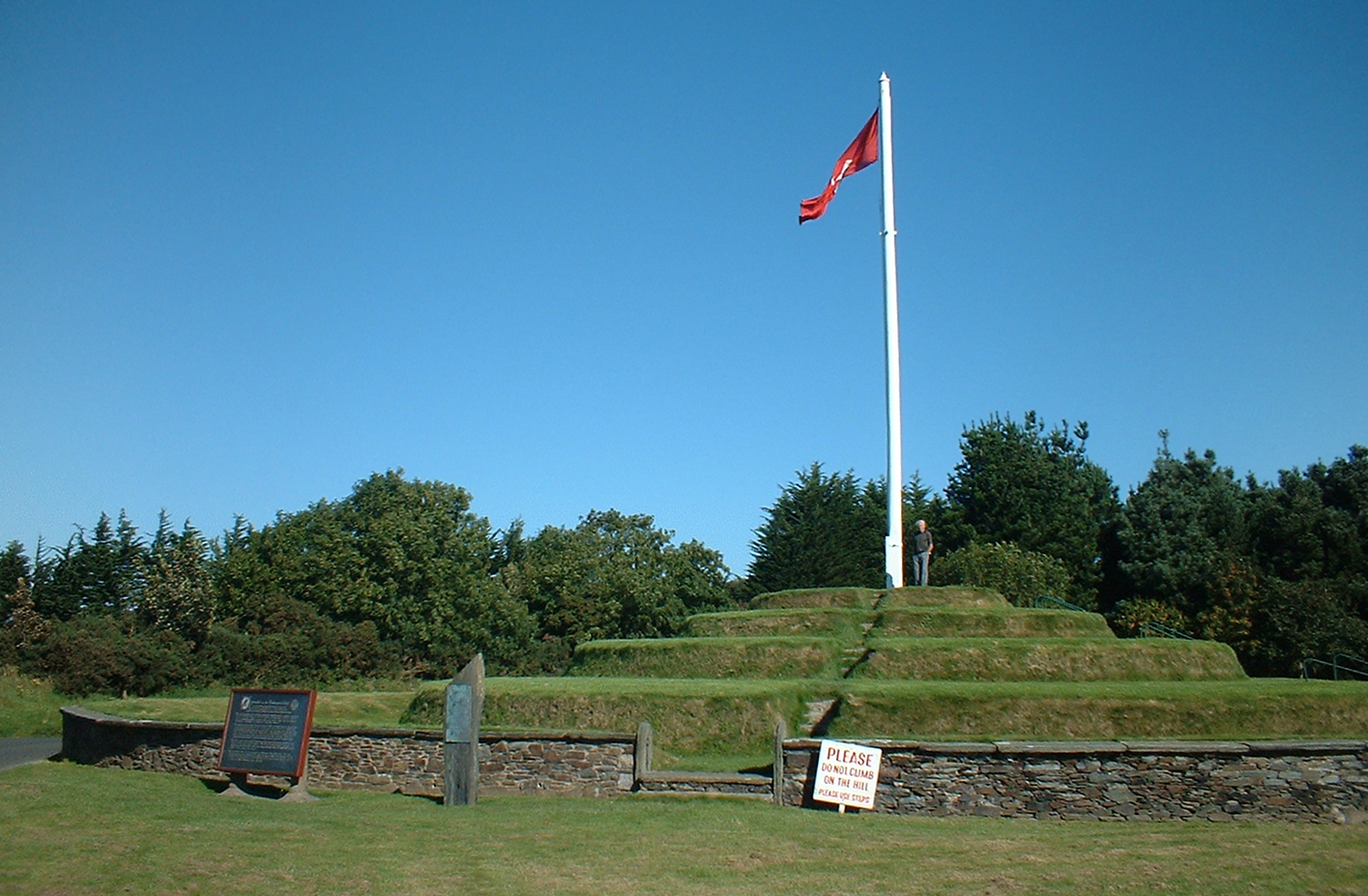
Tynwald Hill, near St John's may have been a national assembly site of the Kingdom of the Isles. It may well have been the place where the Islesmen publicly inaugurated their kings, proclaimed new laws, and resolved disputes. Be that as it may, much of the visible site dates only to the eighteenth-, nineteenth-, and twentieth century. (Note: Evidence of local assembly sites within the kingdom may exist in the Hebridean placenames Tiongal (known in Scottish Gaelic as Cnoc an Tiongalairidh) on Lewis (grid reference NB1937), and Tinwhil (perhaps grid reference NG415583) within the Hinnisdale area on Skye. Like the Manx site, these four Hebridean placenames are derived in part from the Old Norse þing ("assembly"). These sites, and others now lost, may have been established before the dominance of Manx-based kings and their national assembly site. Although the Manx site is first noted by the Chronicle of Mann, the form of name ("tyngualla" and "tingualla") suggests that it is quite old, perhaps dating to the ninth century. The hill is the site of the island's modern national assembly, Tynwald, held annually on Old Midsummer's Day.)

Later in 1238, the chronicle reveals that envoys of Hákon expelled Haraldr from Mann because the latter had refused to render homage to his overlord in Norway. Hákon's delegates in the Isles—a certain Gospatric, and Giolla Críost mac Muircheartaigh—are described by the chronicle to have seized control of the island, and taken tribute which was due to the Norwegian king. By sending such emissaries—men apparently without any hereditary claim to the kingdom—Hákon ignored other potential claimants, such as other members of the Crovan dynasty and members of Clann Somhairle. (Note: Less than a decade before, Hákon had demonstrated Norwegian overlordship in a similar fashion by conferring kingship upon Óspakr-Hákon whilst ignoring other claimants. With the latter's untimely death not long afterwards, Hákon seems to have been responsible for the partitioning of the Crovan dynasty's domain between Óláfr, and Guðrøðr Dond, Óláfr's nephew.) About a decade before, when Haraldr's father first gained complete control of the kingdom, Óláfr journeyed to Norway and may have rendered homage to Hákon. Later in 1235 Óláfr rendered homage to Henry, before being called back to Norway the following year. The episode concerning the ejection of Haraldr may well be related to his father's fealty to the English Crown, and appears to indicate that the latter was deposed for not fulfilling his duties as a Norwegian vassal; and that upon his subsequent removal, Haraldr's rights of vassalage passed to Hákon himself.

Although Haraldr attempted to oust Hákon's representatives on several occasions, his successive invasions of Mann from the Hebrides ultimately proved unsuccessful, and the chronicle indicates that he finally journeyed to Norway to render his submission. After a stay of about two or three years in Scandinavia, the chronicle reports that Haraldr became reconciled with Hákon, who restored him to the kingship. The source reveals that the boundaries of his kingdom were carefully defined by Hákon as the islands which had been previously ruled by Haraldr's father, his uncle (Rǫgnvaldr Guðrøðarson), and his paternal grandfather. The Norwegian king, therefore, not only deliberately excluded the island territories ruled by Clann Somhairle, but limited the possibility of Haraldr becoming in drawn into alignment with Scottish interests like some leading members of Clann Somhairle had been. Upon his return to the Isles, the chronicle states that the Manxmen rejoiced at his arrival; and declares that he afterwards reigned quietly and peacefully, enjoying an alliance of friendship with both the English and Scottish Crowns.

== Acta and honours ==
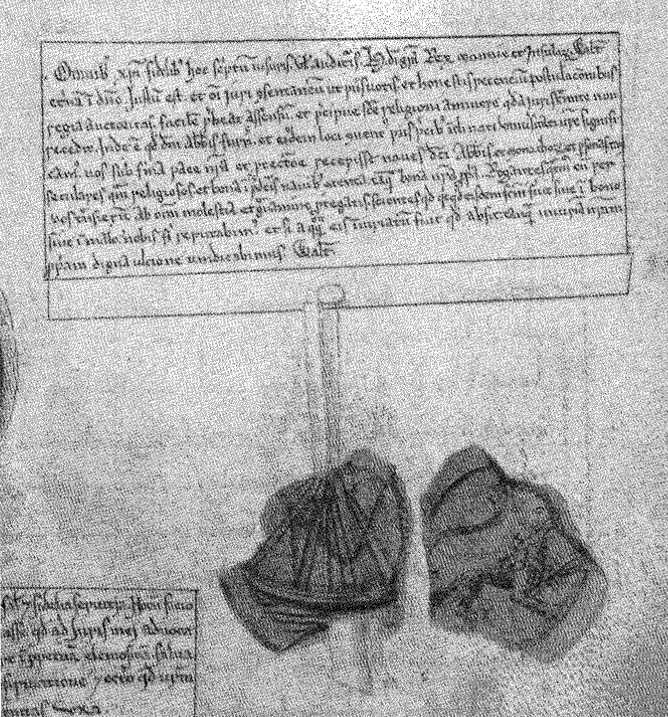
Seventeenth-century illustration of a charter and seal of Haraldr.

The earliest member of the Crovan dynasty known to have utilised a seal is Haraldr's paternal grandfather, who attached such a device to a confirmation charter granted in about 1154. Although none of the original seals borne by the Crovan dynasty have survived, several were documented by sixteenth- and seventeenth-century antiquarians. In regards to Haraldr himself, one such antiquarian named Christopher Hatton not only transcribed two of Haraldr's charters, but made drawings of the seals which were attached to them. The devices themselves were in poor condition by Hatton's time, as his illustrations show portions of them broken away. It is clear, however, that the seals bore a lion on one side, and a clinker-built galley with sails furled on the other side. About a century later, the charters and seals, along with other priceless documents of the Cottonian Library, were destroyed by fire at Ashburnham House in 1731. Waxen seals affixed to acta not only served to authenticate the written documents, but also physically symbolise the authority and significance of them. For example, when Hákon formally confirmed the kingship of Magnús Óláfsson, King of Mann and the Isles, Haraldr's younger brother and eventual royal successor, the Norwegian king is said by the Chronicle of Mann to have done so "by the protection of his seal". To the kings of the Crovan dynasty, whose military strength laid in the power of armed galley-fleets, the symbol of such a vessel upon their seals represented the strength and authority they held in the Isles.

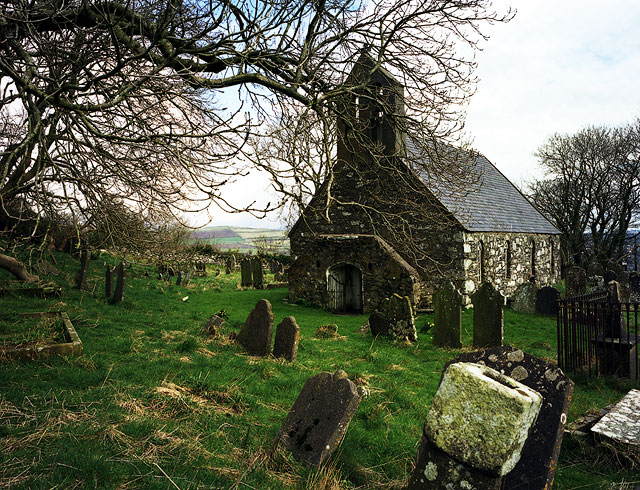
Marown Old Church (the church of St Runius)

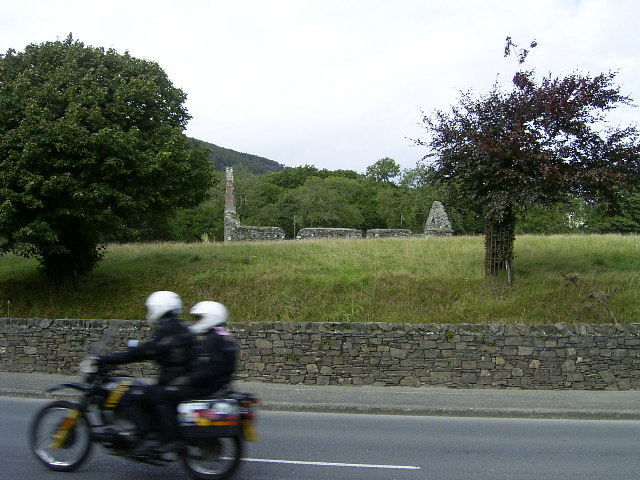
St Trinian's Chapel (the church of St Ninian)

Existing remains of two Manx churches recorded in acta dating to Haraldr's reign. The church of St Runius was drastically altered in the eighteenth century. The church of St Ninian is largely a fourteenth-century ruin.

One of Haraldr's charters to which a seal was attached was a grant to the monks of Furness Abbey concerning mining rights on Mann, the use of a depot at "Bakenaldwath" (probably Ronaldsway), and the freedom from tolls and customs. The record of this document is the earliest evidence for mineral exploitation on the island, an industry that expanded throughout the island by the century's end. In another charter, Haraldr pledged the protection of the abbey's ships and goods. His amiable interactions with the English abbey contrasted the apparent aggression of his father, who was warned by the English king not to harm the monks or their property. In a further charter, evidenced from a sixteenth-century copy, Haraldr confirmed his father's earlier grant of the lands of "Balhamer" (probably Ballaharry), and the churches of St Ninian of "Ballacgniba" and St Runius (all located in the Manx parish of Marown), to Whithorn Priory in Galloway. Of the twenty royal charters known to have been issued by the Crovan dynasty, only three can be assigned to Haraldr's reign. (Note: One of the total twenty cannot be assigned to any particular ruler.)

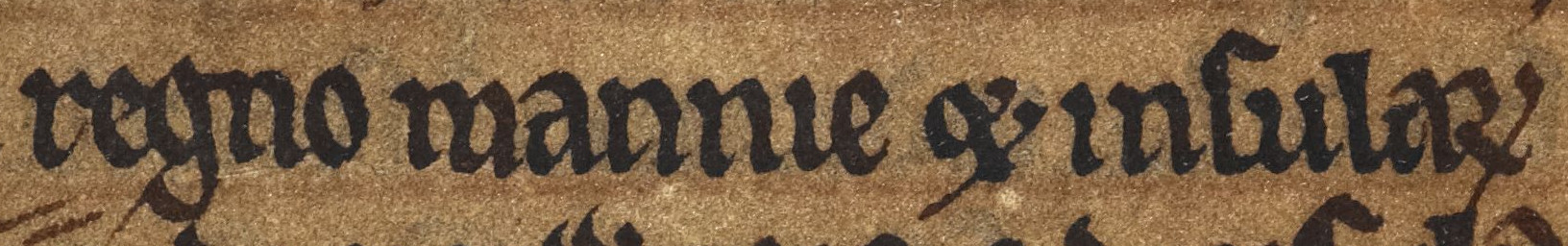
The name of Haraldr's realm as it appears on folio 46r of British Library Cotton Julius A VII (the Chronicle of Mann): "regno Manniæ et Insularum" ("Kingdom of Mann and the Isles").

Like his father before him, and his brother Magnús after him, Haraldr was knighted by Henry. The chronicle claims that the event took place in 1247, and elaborates that Haraldr returned home with "much honour, and great gifts". Contemporary English administrative records, however, reveal that the deed took place early in 1246. Specifically, a letter of safe-conduct, issued by the English king on 9 January 1246, orders that Haraldr was to be given safe-passage through England until Pentecost (27 May 1246). Similarly, the thirteenth-century Chronica majora reports that Henry confirmed the honour of knighthood upon Haraldr on Easter day that year. Numerous titles were accorded to the kings of the Crovan dynasty. The style apparently preferred by Haraldr's father was rex insularum. As for Haraldr and Magnús, they appear to have favoured the variant form rex mannie et insularum. According to the seventeenth-century antiquarians William Camden and John Selden, this title appeared on the legend of seals borne by the dynasty. It is unknown whose emblems these men were referring to, although they may well have been those of Haraldr. These titles are an equivalent of the Gaelic title rí Innsi Gall ("king of the islands of the foreigners") first recorded in 989, a style almost certainly referring to Mann and the Hebrides. Other sources accord Haraldr similar titles. The Icelandic annals, for example, style him "Svðréyiakonvngs" ("king of the Hebrides").

== Dynastic alliance ==
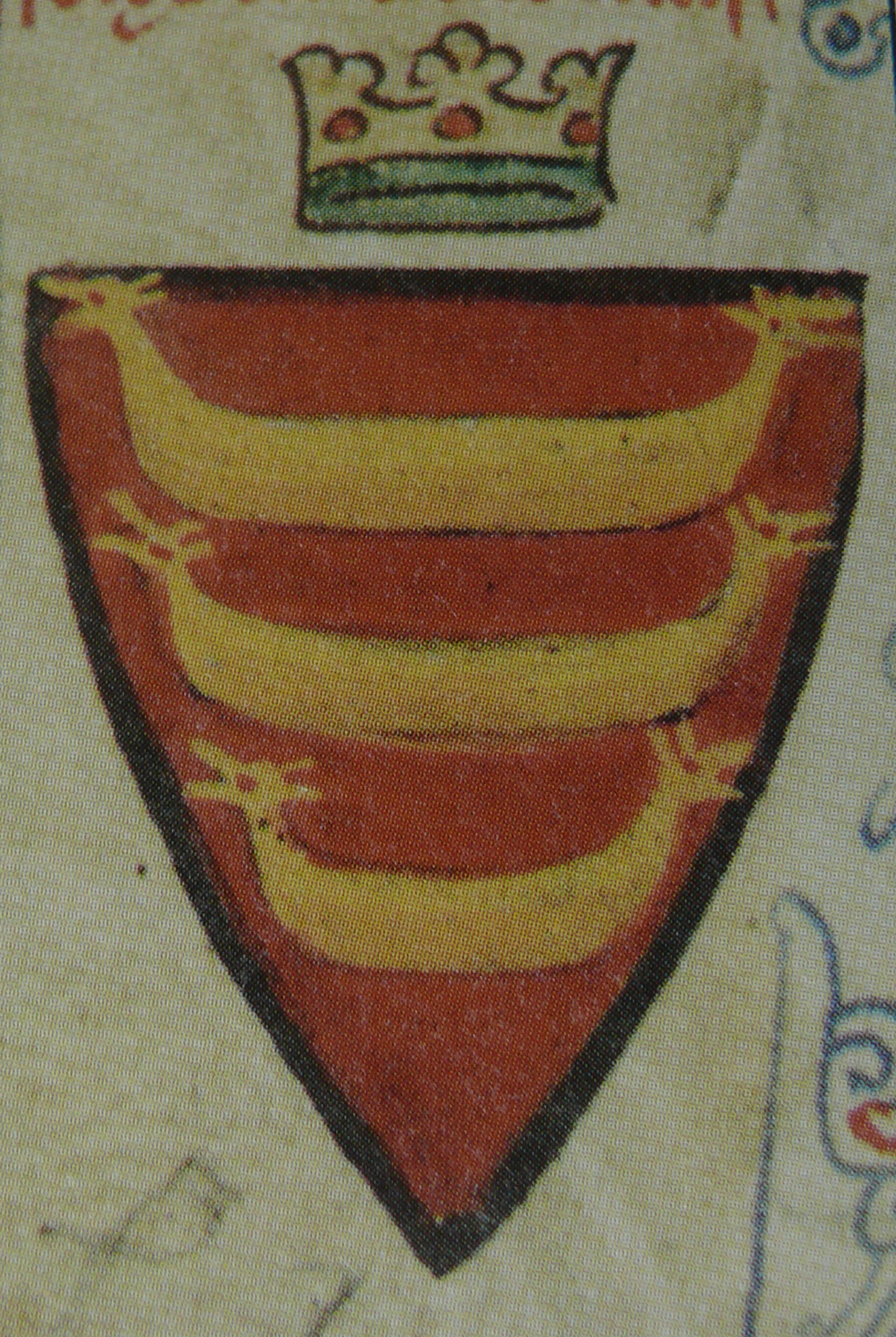
Coat of arms of Hákon Hákonarson as depicted on folio 216v of Cambridge Corpus Christi College Parker Library 16II (Chronica majora). (Note: This coat of arms is blazoned: gules, three galleys with dragon heads at each end or, one above the other. The coat of arms concerns Hákon's coronation, and its associated caption reads in Latin: "Scutum regis Norwagiae nuper coronati, qui dicitur rex Insularum". The coat of arms was illustrated by Matthew Paris, a man who met Hákon in 1248/1249, the year after the king's coronation. The emphasise that Matthew placed upon the Norwegian realm's sea power appears to be underscored in the heraldry he attributed to Hákon.)

In the autumn of 1247, Haraldr again voyaged to Norway, as evidenced by the Chronicle of Mann and the thirteenth-century Hákonar saga Hákonarsonar. After Haraldr removed from Oslo to Bergen, these sources reveal that Hákon gave the hand of his widowed daughter, Cecilía, in marriage to Haraldr. (Note: Cecilía was one of at least two illegitimate children of Hákon. Her mother was a certain Kanga, a woman of whom nothing else is known. Cecilía had previously been married to a lendr maðr named Gregorius Andrésson.) Throughout his long reign, Hákon endeavoured to strengthen his far-flung Norwegian realm. In regard to the Isles, his bestowal of Cecilía in matrimony to Haraldr brought relations between the rulers of the realms to its climax. The compilers of the chronicle clearly considered the union to have elevated Haraldr's prestige above that of his predecessors, as this source claims that Hákon had declared he would hold his new son-in-law "in great glory and exalt the throne of his kingdom above all who ruled before him in the Isles".

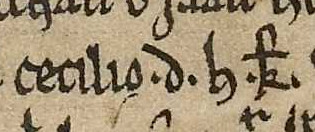
Cecilía's name as it appears on folio 112v of AM 45 fol: "Cecilio dottur Hakonar konvngs".

Whilst Haraldr was still in Norway, the saga states that two leading members of Clann Somhairle arrived at Hákon's court, with each seeking the kingship of the Isles: Eóghan Mac Dubhghaill, Lord of Argyll and Dubhghall mac Ruaidhrí. Although 1247 was also the year of Hákon's royal coronation, and it is possible that the arrival of the Clann Somhairle dynasts was a result of the reimposition of Norwegian overlordship (as appears to have been the case with Haraldr), there may have been other reasons for the arrival of Eóghan and Dubhghall. For example, 1247 was also the year that a prominent member of Clann Somhairle, called "Mac Somhairle" in Irish sources, was slain in Ireland battling the English. (Note: Various Irish sources style Mac Somhairle rí Airer Goidel and tigerna Airer Goidel. The identity of this Clann Somhairle dynast is uncertain, although he is most likely to have been Dubhghall's father, Ruaidhrí.) The knighting of Haraldr the year previous may well have entailed some act of submission to the Henry, and it is possible that Hákon had consequently recognised Mac Somhairle's kingship in the Isles in response to Haraldr's acceptance of English overtures. An alliance with a ruler of the Isles would have certainly benefited Henry's ongoing military operations in Ireland, and it is possible that it was such a pact that had prompted Mac Somhairle's involvement against the English. Haraldr's subsequent marriage to Cecilía, therefore, may have been a successful attempt by Hákon to lure Haraldr back to his side.

== Death and after-effects ==
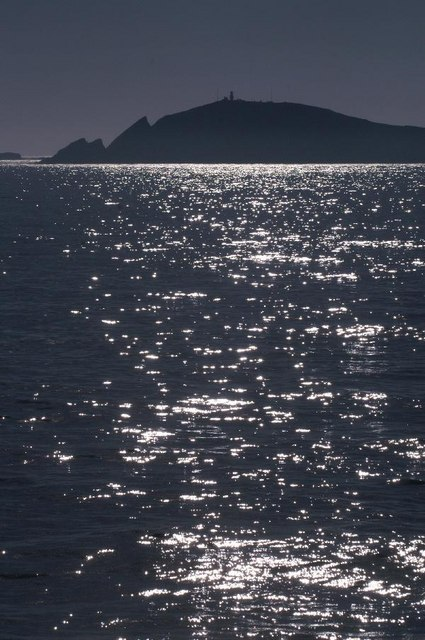
Sumburgh Head. Haraldr is said to have drowned nearby in Sumburgh Roost, a dangerous tidal race called Dynröst by Hákonar saga Hákonarsonar, now known to Shetlanders as Da Roost.

In 1248, the Chronicle of Mann, Hákonar saga Hákonarsonar, and the Icelandic annals indicate that Haraldr and Cecilía drowned whilst voyaging from Norway to the Isles. Whilst the former source laments that Harald's death "a cause of grief to all who had known him", the latter states that his death was the "greatest harm and ill-luck" to the Islsemen who "lost so suddenly such a prince, when his voyage to Norway had been so lucky". Since the wreckage of their vessel washed ashore from the south, the saga specifically states that the ship was thought to have been lost south of Shetland in Dynröst, a treacherous tidal race otherwise known in more modern times as Sumburgh Roost and Da Roost, lying between Sumburgh Head and Fair Isle (grid reference HU405070). (Note: A nineteenth-century account of this perilous passage runs as follows: "There appears to be a strong current setting to the eastward in the sea between Orkney and Shetland, and in shaping a course from the main land of Scotland to Shetland some allowance ought to be made for this. Indeed, probably the best method of making the passage would he to keep the Orcadian land aboard till you reach the Start Point at the extremity of that Archipelago, and from thence steer a course for Sumburgh Head, keeping to the westward of the Fair Isle. The only thing to be avoided in taking this plan, is getting involved in the furious tide race, known as Sumburgh Roost: this, as we found, extends some miles to the south of the Shetland Islands, and in rough weather the sea is frightful, even in calm weather the danger is considerable, and there are instances narrated of vessels which have been dismasted [sic] in the swell, and kept vibrating backwards and forwards in these seething tides for weeks at a time. In passing the Roost you should either keep a good offing or steer close to the shore: the latter being I believe the surest method of avoiding the heavy overfalls [sic]".) Amongst those drowned was Laurence, Archdeacon of Mann, a man who had recently been elected Bishop of the Isles by the chapter of Mann. Although Laurence had presented himself in Norway to Haraldr and Sigurðr tapsi Indriðason, Archbishop of Niðaróss, the chronicle reveals that Haraldr had postponed his consecration until the former could be publicly elected in the Isles before king, clergy, and people. (Note: In 1244, Pope Innocent IV ordered the Archbishop of York to consecrate a candidate presented by monks of Furness as Bishop of the Isles, because the Church of Niðaróss was very distant from the Church of the Isles, "separated from it by a most dangerous sea".)

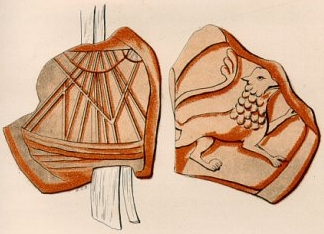
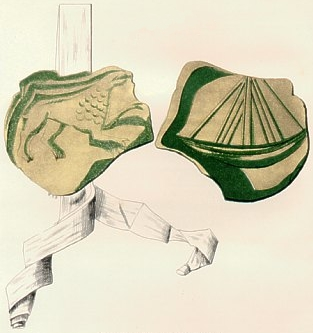
Nineteenth-century representations of seventeenth-century illustrations of Haraldr's now non-existent seals.

Haraldr's death led to what was the final stage of inter-dynastic strife amongst his family. News of Haraldr and Cecilía's death does not appear to have reached Mann until the spring of 1249. According to the chronicle, Haraldr's younger brother, Rǫgnvaldr, succeeded to the kingship on 6 May 1249, only to be slain on 30 May by a man who appears to have been an accomplice of Rǫgnvaldr and Haraldr's cousin, Haraldr Guðrøðarson. With Rǫgnvaldr out of the way, Haraldr Guðrøðarson successfully seized the throne, and replaced Haraldr's former supporters with proponents of his own. According to the chronicle, one of the men who suffered under Haraldr Guðrøðarson's regime was a certain chieftain called "Dofnaldus". This man is stated to have been held in high esteem by Haraldr, but held a prisoner by Haraldr Guðrøðarson. Although the identity of this man is uncertain, he could be identical to Domhnall, the eponym of Clann Domhnaill. If such an identification is correct, and if Haraldr's mother was indeed Lauon of Clann Somhairle, the captive Dofnaldus would have been a close kinsman of Haraldr (perhaps a maternal uncle or maternal grandfather). In fact, Haraldr seems to have relied upon Hebridean support as opposed to Manx support during his reign. For example, the chronicle makes note of three sons of a certain Niall who supported Haraldr's cause early in his reign. It is possible that these men were related to a certain Domhnall mac Néill, an obscure figure who faced the brunt of a Scottish royal army in 1221. The latter's patronym suggests that he may have had Hebridean or Ulster connections.

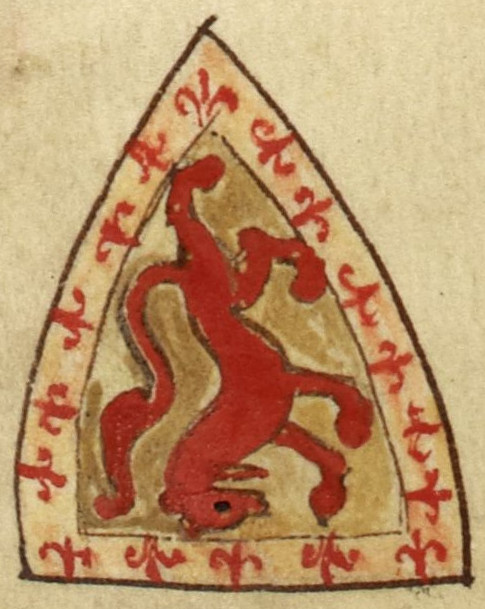
Coat of arms of Alexander as it appears on folio 146v of British Library Royal 14 C VII (Historia Anglorum). The inverted shield represents the king's death in 1249. (Note: This coat of arms is blazoned: or, a lion rampant gules and a bordure flory counter gules.)

The maritime disaster in which Haraldr and Cecilía lost their lives demonstrates some of the difficulties faced by the Norwegian Crown in maintaining control of the far-flung Norse colonies west over sea. (Note: The term "west over sea", used in saga-literature, denotes the relative direction of Britain and Ireland in relation to Norway.) Not only did the calamity deprive the Islesmen of a capable king, but cost the Norwegian Crown a closely connected advocate in the region. Upon learning of the catastrophe, Hákon quickly sent Eóghan west over sea to temporarily take up the kingship of the Isles on his behalf. Eóghan, however, was not only a Norwegian dependant in the Isles, but an immanent Scottish magnate on the mainland. For several years the Scottish Crown appears to have attempted to acquire the Hebrides from Norwegian overlordsip, and expand its authority in Argyll. The apparent cooling of relations between Eóghan and Alexander, along with Haraldr's later demise, the resulting kin-strife concerning his succession, and Eóghan's subsequent acceptance of royal powers on Hákon's behalf, could all have contributed to the massed invasion into Argyll by Scottish royal forces within the year. After Alexander demanded Eóghan renounce his allegiance to Hákon, and ordered him to hand over certain mainland and island fortresses, Eóghan apparently withdrew into the northern Hebrides. The unfolding crisis only ended with the Scottish king's untimely death soon afterwards in July. According to Hákonar saga Hákonarsonar, Alexander had made it clear that he had no intention of turning back until he had acquired control of the western Norwegian dominions within his sights. Within about two decades, such desires would be fully realised by his successor-son, with the final eclipse of Norwegian overlordship in the Isles and the extinction of the Crovan dynasty itself.

== Ancestry ==
Ancestors of Haraldr Óláfsson

8. Óláfr Guðrøðarson, King of the Isles (died 1153)
4. Guðrøðr Óláfsson, King of Dublin and the Isles (died 1187)
9. Affraic inghean Fearghusa
2. Óláfr Guðrøðarson, King of the Isles (died 1237)
10. Niall Mac Lochlainn, King of Cineál Eoghain (died 1176)
5. Fionnghuala Nic Lochlainn
1. Haraldr Óláfsson, King of Mann and the Isles (died 1249)

== Citations ==
Haraldr Óláfsson Crovan dynasty Died: 1249
Regnal titles
Preceded by Óláfr Guðrøðarson as King of the Isles	King of Mann and the Isles; 1237–1248	Succeeded by Rǫgnvaldr Óláfsson
