= Crovan dynasty =

Medieval dynasty

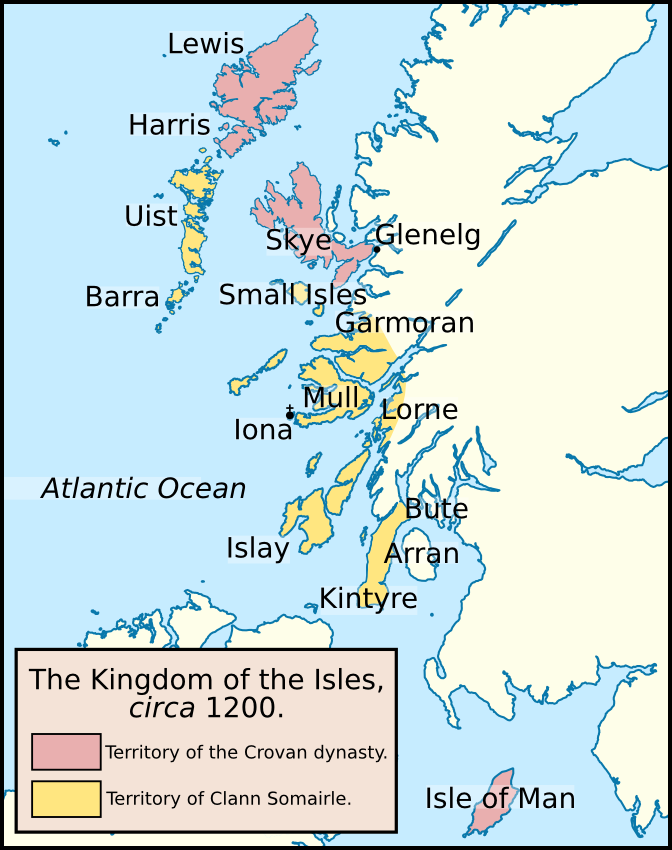
The division between the lands of the Crovan dynasty and Clann Somhairle, in about 1200.

The Crovan dynasty, from the late 11th century to the mid 13th century, was the ruling family of an insular kingdom known variously in secondary sources as the Kingdom of Mann, the Kingdom of the Isles, and the Kingdom of Mann and the Isles. The eponymous founder of the dynasty was Godred Crovan, who appeared from obscurity in the late 11th century, before his takeover of the Isle of Man and Dublin. The dynasty was of Gaelic-Scandinavian origin, descending from a branch of the Uí Ímair, a dominant kindred in the Irish Sea region which first appears on record in the late 9th century.

Leading members of the Crovan dynasty formed marriage-alliances with the Irish and Norwegian kings, as well as Hebridean, Gallovidian, and Anglo-Norman lords, and possibly Welsh princes as well. Surrounded by sometimes threatening English, Norwegian and Scottish monarchs, and various warlords from the western seaboard of Scotland, the leading members of the dynasty at times tactfully recognised the overlordship of certain kings of Norway and England, and even the Papacy. The military might of the dynasty were their fleets of galleys, and their forces battled in Ireland, the Hebrides, Wales, and the Isle of Man. The importance of the galley to the sea-Kings of the Crovan dynasty is illustrated in its implementation upon seals that certain members are known to have used.

Alex Woolf believes the Clann Somhairle can be regarded as a female line cadet branch of the Crovan dynasty.

After Somerled's coup, the Crovan dynasty were temporarily deposed from all except the Isle of Man, and Dublin. On Somerled's death, they were allowed to inherit part of the realm : Lewis, Harris, and Skye.

== Dynasts ==
- Godred Crovan, died 1095
- Logmann, d. 1103, son of Godfred
- Olaf, d. 1153, son of Godfred
- Godred, d. 1187, son of Olaf, who lost most of the Kingdom to Somerled's family
- Reginald, fl. 1164, son of Olaf, half-brother of Godred, he and successors ruled only in Northern Isles
- Godred, restored
- Reginald, d. 1229, son of Godred
- Olaf the Black, s. 1237, son of Godred, half-brother of Reginald
- Godred, d. 1231, son of Reginald
- Harald, d. 1248, son of Olaf
- Reginald, d. 1249, son of Olaf
- Harald, fl. 1249, son of Godred
- Magnus, died 1265, son of Olaf

In Magnus's lifetime, Ewan MacDougall, a descendant of Somerled, was appointed king of the Hebrides by Haakon, the Norwegian king. Magnus remained titular king of Man. In the year after Magnus died, in 1266, the Treaty of Perth was signed, transferring overlordship of the Isles and Man to the Scottish king.

Family tree

1 Godred; Crovan died 1095
2 Logmann died 1103	3 Olaf died 1153
4;6; Godred died 1187	5 Reginald fl. 1164
7 Reginald died 1229	8 Olaf died 1237
9 Godred died 1231	10; Harald died 1248	11; Reginald died 1249	13; Magnus died 1265
12; Harald fl. 1249
