= Guðrøðarson =

Guðrøðarson or Gudrödarson may refer to:

- Halfdan Gudrödarson or Halfdan the Black, (9th century?) king of Vestfold
- Haraldr Guðrøðarson, mid thirteenth-century King of the Isles
- Lǫgmaðr Guðrøðarson, late eleventh-century King of the Isles
- Ólafr Guðrøðarson (died 941), Irish-Viking leader who ruled Dublin and Viking Northumbria
- Óláfr Guðrøðarson (died 1153), twelfth-century King of Mann and the Isles
- Óláfr Guðrøðarson (died 1237) or Olaf the Black, King of the Isles, member of the Crovan dynasty
- Rǫgnvaldr Guðrøðarson (died 1229), ruled as King of the Isles from 1187 to 1226
