= Olaf the Red =

Olaf the Red may refer to:

- Amlaíb Cuarán, 10th century King of Northumbria and Dublin
- Óláfr Guðrøðarson (died 1153), 12th century King of the Isles
- Olaf Guthfrithson, 10th Century king of Dublin and York.
- Olaf the Red, 10th century king described in the Icelandic Sagas as the powerful king of Scotland. Invaded Northumbria, defeated and killed in battle by king Æthelstan of Wessex. Story as described in the Icelandic Sagas (‘Egil’s Saga’).
