= Domnall mac Taidc =

- King of the Isles; King of Thomond
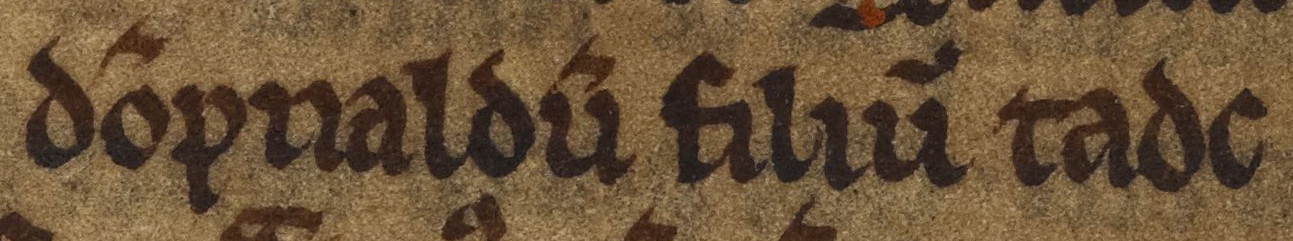
- Domnall's name as it appears on folio 33v of British Library Cotton Julius A VII (the Chronicle of Mann): "Dompnaldum filium Tadc".
- Died: 1115
- House: Meic Taidc (Uí Briain)
- Father: Tadc mac Toirdelbaig
- Mother: Mór ingen Echmarcacha

Domnall mac Taidc (died 1115) was the ruler of the Kingdom of the Isles, the Kingdom of Thomond, and perhaps the Kingdom of Dublin as well. (Note: Since the 2000s, academics have accorded Domnall various patronymic names in English secondary sources: Domnall mac Taidc meic Tairdelbaig, Domnall mac Taidc Uí Briain, Domnall mac Taidc ua Briain, Domnall mac Taidc, Domnall mac Taidg, Domnall mac Taidg Ua Briain, and Domnall Ua Briain.) His father was Tadc, son of Toirdelbach Ua Briain, King of Munster, which meant that Domnall was a member of the Meic Taidc, a branch of the Uí Briain. Domnall's mother was Mór, daughter of Echmarcach mac Ragnaill, King of Dublin and the Isles, which may have given Domnall a stake to the kingship of the Isles.

In 1094, Domnall's uncle, Muirchertach Ua Briain, High King of Ireland, drove Gofraid Crobán, King of Dublin and the Isles from Dublin, and may have replaced him with Domnall himself. Certainly at some point following Gofraid's death in 1095, Muirchertach installed Domnall as King of the Isles. The latter's reign was short-lived however, and Domnall appears to have been forced from the Isles prior to its subsequent conquest by the King of Norway.

In 1111, Domnall evidently seized the kingship of the Isles by force. It is uncertain whether he enjoyed Uí Briain support in this venture. Several years later, at a time when his aforesaid uncle was gravely ill, Domnall was again active in Ireland. Although he may have openly left the Isles to take advantage of his uncle's demise, it is also possible he was forced out by the Islesmen. Domnall was slain in 1115, apparently at the hands of Toirdelbach Ua Conchobair, King of Connacht.

== Familial origins ==
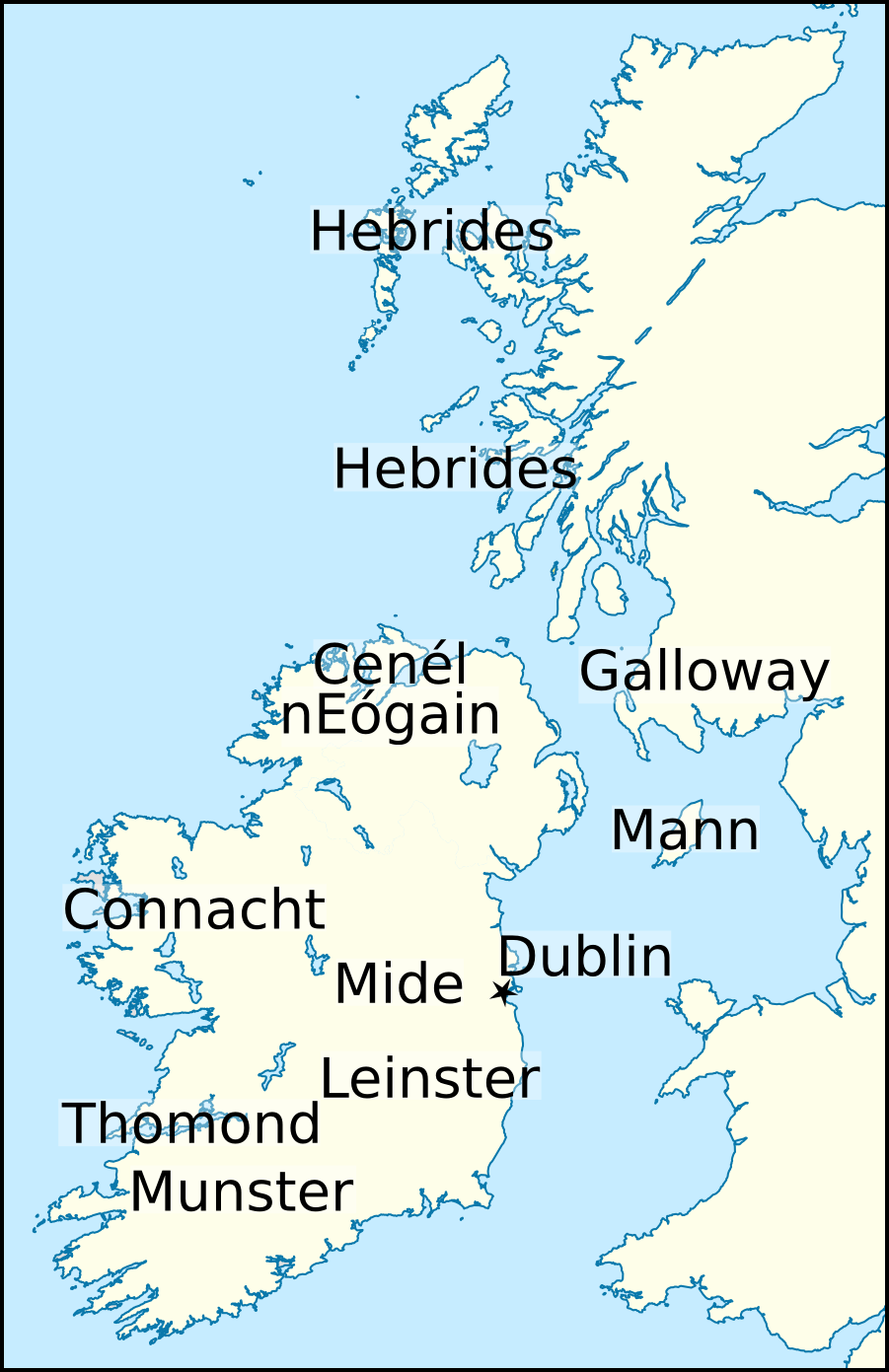
Locations relating to Domnall's life and times.

Domnall was a son of Tadc, son of Toirdelbach Ua Briain, King of Munster. Domnall was, therefore, a member of the Meic Taidc. According to the twelfth-century Banshenchas, Domnall's father married Mór, daughter of Echmarcach mac Ragnaill, King of Dublin and the Isles. This source specifies that the couple had three sons and a daughter: Amlaíb, Bé Binn, Donnchad, and Domnall himself.

== Uí Briain intervention in Dublin ==
Toirdelbach Ua Briain died in 1086, and the Kingdom of Munster was partitioned between his three surviving sons: Muirchertach, Diarmait, and Tadc. The latter expired only a month after his father, after which Muirchertach drove Diarmait from Munster altogether, seizing the kingship for himself. Muirchertach then embarked upon extending his authority throughout Ireland. During this period, Muirchertach not only had to contend with the opposing forces of his surviving brother, but also those of the Meic Taidc, the sons of his deceased brother. In 1091, however, the Meic Taidc appear to have come to terms with Muirchertach—at least temporarily—as the seventeenth-century Annals of the Four Masters reports that a peace was agreed between him and the Meic Taidc, who are nonetheless said to have acted treacherously towards Muirchertach's men. Although Muirchertach appears to have regained control of the Kingdom of Dublin by 1090, he soon after lost it to Gofraid Crobán, King of the Isles, until he forced the latter from the kingship of Dublin once and for all in 1094. It may have been at this point that Muirchertach installed his son, Domnall Gerrlámhach, to the kingship. Another possibility, however, is that Muirchertach instead appointed Domnall himself after Gofraid's expulsion.

== Meic Taidc interference in the Isles ==
Gofraid died in the Hebrides the year after his expulsion from Dublin. Whether this is evidence that he had been driven from Mann is uncertain. According to the thirteenth- to fourteenth-century Chronicle of Mann, Gofraid was succeeded in the Isles by his eldest son, Lagmann, who appears to have been forced to fend off factions supporting the claims of his younger brothers. At some point, the chronicle claims that the leading Islesmen sought assistance of Muirchertach, and petitioned him to provide a regent from his own kin to govern the kingdom until Lagmann's younger brother, Amlaíb mac Gofraid, was old enough to assume control. The chronicle's account could be evidence that, by about 1096, Lagmann faced a faction formed around his younger brother; and that, when this faction was unable to topple Lagmann by itself, it approached Muirchertach for assistance in placing Amlaíb mac Gofraid upon the throne. Muirchertach was certainly a formidable potential ally, having recently imposed his dominance over the kingdoms of Connacht, Leinster, Mide, and Dublin. In consequence of this predominance, the clause as stated by the chronicle—that Muirchertach was to provide the Isles with a regent from his own kin—may well have been a condition on his intervention, rather than a request of the Islesmen themselves. Whatever the case, the chronicle reveals that Muirchertach then installed Domnall upon the throne.

Excerpt from folio 458v of Royal Irish Academy C iii 3 (the Annals of the Four Masters) concerning the death of Domnall's brother, Amlaíb, in 1096.

Although Domnall had earlier opposed Muirchertach over the kingship of Munster, he possessed strong familial connections with the Isles through his maternal descent from Echmarcach. In fact, the fifteenth- to sixteenth-century Annals of Ulster reveals that at least two apparent members of Echmarcach's family were killed less than a decade before in a repulsed invasion of Mann. As a result of their demise, Domnall may well have become the leading male representative of his mother's family. From the standpoint of the Uí Briain, the union of Domnall's parents would, therefore, seem to have been orchestrated in the context of extending Uí Briain authority into the Isles. In 1096, the Annals of the Four Masters reveals that Domnall's brother, Amlaíb, lost his life on Mann, apparently whilst supporting Domnall's undertaking in the Isles. This source not only corroborates Uí Briain intervention in the Isles, but suggests that Domnall and the rest of the Meic Taidc faced significant opposition there, possibly in the form of Lagmann's adherents. The chronicle credits Domnall with an oppressive three-year reign that ended when the leading Islesmen revolted against him, and drove him from the kingdom back to Ireland.

== Norwegian ascendancy in Dublin and the Isles ==
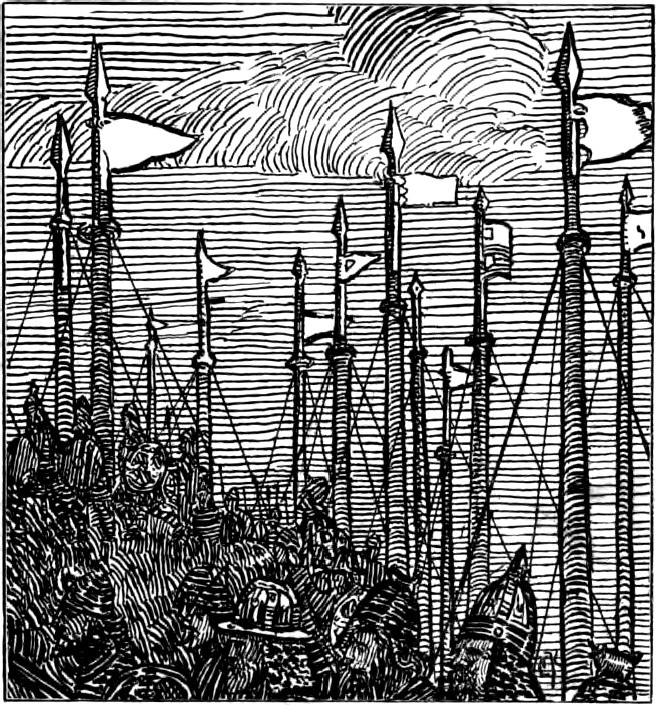
Nineteenth-century depiction of Magnús Óláfsson's forces in Ireland.

The extent of Domnall's rule in the kingdom is unknown, and it is questionable whether he had any real authority in the northern Hebrides, furthest from Mann. In about 1097, Magnús Óláfsson, King of Norway sent a delegate named Ingimundr into the Isles to take possession of the kingdom. After installing himself on Lewis, Ingimundr was overthrown and killed whilst attempting to usurp the kingship. Ingimundr's rationale for seating himself upon an island on the edge of the kingdom may have been due to the fact that he was unable to gain any authority on Mann itself. In fact, the chronicle reveals that civil war erupted there the following year, and the chronicler Orderic Vitalis indicates that Mann was devastated to point of being a virtual desert by the time Magnús appeared on the scene. The warring itself may have been related to the aforesaid factional struggles between Gofraid's sons. Although it is possible that it was Magnús who actually forced Domnall from the Isles, the fact the chronicle makes no mention of Domnall during the recorded conflict on Mann may be evidence that he had lost control of the island by then.

Within the year, Magnús himself arrived in the Isles, captured Lagmann, and conquered the kingdom. After overwintering in region, the Norwegian king left for Scandinavia in the summer, only to make his return nearly four years later, in 1102 or 1103. Once re-established on Mann, Magnús may well have seized control of Dublin before entering into an alliance with Muirchertach, formalised through the marriage between Magnús's young son, Sigurðr, and Muirchertach's daughter, Bjaðmunjo. The arrangement seems to reveal that Magnús intended for Sigurðr to rule over his recently won territories. Although it may have also meant that Norwegian sovereignty in the Isles was recognised by the Irish, it is also possible that Muirchertach intended to exert his own influence into the region through his new son-in-law. Unfortunately for Muirchertach, and his long-term ambitions in Ireland and the Isles, Magnús was slain in Ulster in 1103, whereupon Sigurðr immediately repudiated his bride and returned to Norway. Although Muirchertach was able to regain control of Dublin, and still held considerable influence in the Isles, Magnús' death appears to have left a power vacuum in the region that he was unable to fill. (Note: Uí Briain ambitions in the Isles may be illustrated by the fact that, whilst the Annals of the Four Masters, the fourteenth-century Annals of Tigernach, and the twelfth-century Chronicon Scotorum, accord Magnús royal status in the Isles on his death, the Munster-based eleventh- to fourteenth-century Annals of Inisfallen does not specifically acknowledge his royal authority in the Isles, and merely describes him as "king of the foreigners".)

== Restoration in the Isles; death in Ireland ==
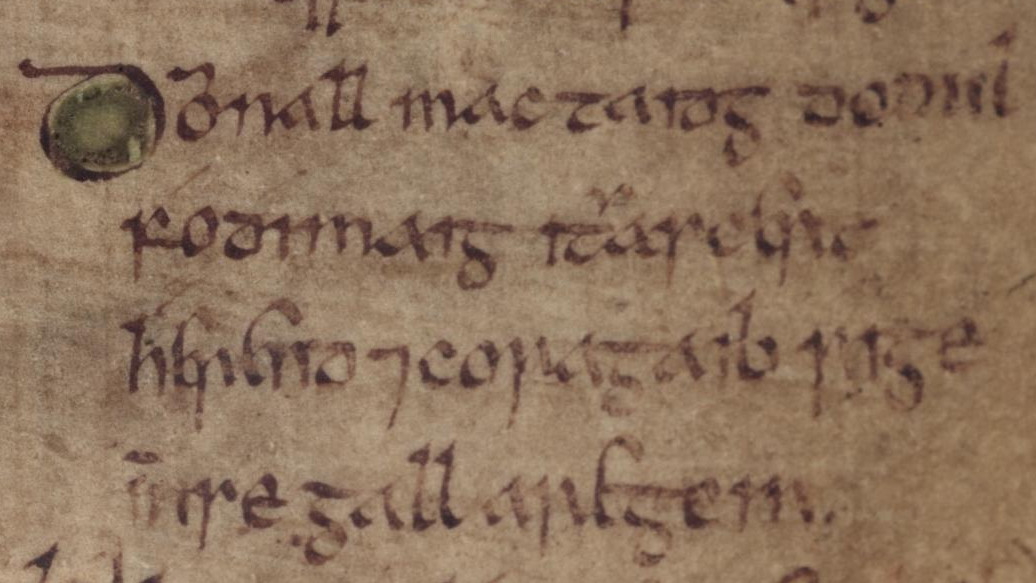
Excerpt from folio 33r of Oxford Bodleian Library Rawlinson B 503 (the Annals of Inisfallen) concerning Domnall's invasion of the Isles in 1111.

In 1111, according to the eleventh- to fourteenth-century Annals of Inisfallen, Domnall mac Taidc seized the kingship of the Isles by force. (Note: A seemingly unlikely claim, preserved by the eighteenth-century An Leabhar Muimhneach, alleges that Domnall not only conquered the Isles during his career but also Galloway.) This annal-entry is the only notice of Domnall's lordship in the Isles preserved by Irish sources. This could indicate that the chronicle's aforesaid account of the petitioning of Muirchertach is incorrectly dated, and actually refers to about 1111. However, the fact that the chronicle places the petitioning during a period of new-found Uí Briain dominance in the region, before Magnús' arrival in the Isles, and at about the same time as Amlaíb's death, suggests that the chronicle's chronology concerning these events is sound, and that Domnall's seizure of the kingship in 1111 was indeed a return to the Isles.

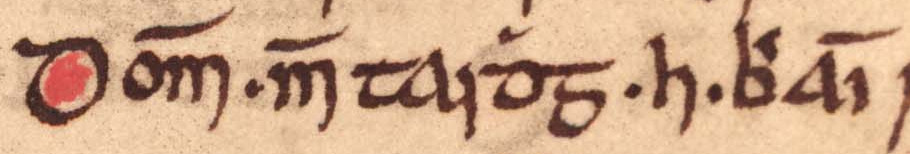
Domnall's name as it appears on folio 48r of Oxford Bodleian Library Rawlinson B 489 (the Annals of Ulster).

There is uncertainty as to whether Domnall was supported in his venture by the rest of the Uí Briain. Although it is possible that he enjoyed backing from Muirchertach himself, the fact that the Annals of the Four Masters states that Muirchertach had Domnall imprisoned three years before could be evidence that Domnall had made his move into the Isles without Muirchertach's consent. (Note: The fact that Domnall is recorded to have been imprisoned in Dublin by Muirchertach in 1107 could be evidence that had been acting as a less-than-satisfactory governor of Dublin at the time.) The annal-entry concerning Domnall's seizure of the Isles reveals that Domnall launched his campaign from northern Ireland, and a further entry in the same source shows that Dublin was occupied by Muirchertach for about three months, the very year of Domnall's campaign. These records appear to indicate that Domnall was aided in his undertaking in the Isles by Muirchertach's northern opponents, and that Muirchertach occupied the town as means to directly counter Domnall's campaign, and deny him any support from the Dubliners. In fact, Domnall may well have been supported in the Isles by Domnall Mac Lochlainn, King of Cenél nEógain, a northern monarch who was not only Muirchertach's principal rival, but the representative of a family with a long history of involvement in the region.

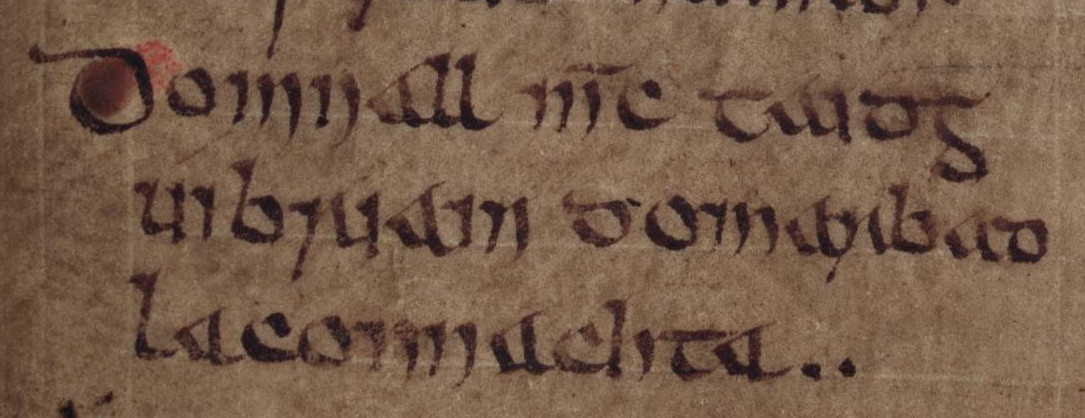
Excerpt from folio 34r of Oxford Bodleian Library Rawlinson B 503 concerning Domnall's death at the hands of the Connachta in 1115.

Not long after his intrusion into the Isles—perhaps in 1113 or 1114—Domnall appears to have been either driven out by force, or drawn back to Ireland in an attempt to capitalise on Muirchertach's failing health. This would appear to have been about the point when Amlaíb mac Gofraid began his own forty-year reign in the Isles. The latter, who apparently spent a considerable part of his childhood at the court of Henry I, King of England, may well have enjoyed the English king's assistance in assuming control of the Isles, and perhaps precipitated Domnall's departure. Whatever the cause for Domnall's return to Ireland, he certainly predeceased his rival uncle, and was killed by Toirdelbach Ua Conchobair, King of Connacht, as the Annals of Inisfallen, the sixteenth-century Annals of Loch Cé, the Annals of the Four Masters, the fourteenth-century Annals of Tigernach, the Annals of Ulster, and the fifteenth-century Mac Carthaigh's Book all report Domnall's death at the hands of the Connachta in 1115. In fact, Toirdelbach Ua Conchobair had invaded Thomond earlier that year, and the Annals of Tigernach elaborates that he had installed Domnall as King of Thomond at that point. This source further reveals that Domnall had afterwards turned against Toirdelbach Ua Conchobair, who in turn invaded Thomond and had Domnall eliminated.

== Ancestry ==
Ancestors of Domnall mac Taidc

16. Brian Bóruma mac Cennétig, High King of Ireland (died 1014)
8. Tadc mac Briain (died 1023)
17. Echrad ingen Carlusa
4. Toirdelbach Ua Briain, High King of Ireland (died 1086)
18. Gilla Brigte Ua Máel Muaid, King of Cenél Fiachach (died 1071)
9. Mór ingen Gilla Brigte
2. Tadc mac Toirdelbaig
20. Gilla Pátraic
10. Tadc mac Gilla Pátraic, King of Osraige
5. Derb Forgaill ingen Taidc (died 1098)
1. Domnall mac Taidc, King of the Isles (died 1115)
12. Ragnall (Note: There is uncertainty as to the identity of Echmarcach's father.)
6. Echmarcach mac Ragnaill, King of Dublin and the Isles (died 1004/1005)
3. Mór ingen Echmarcacha
