= Lǫgmaðr Guðrøðarson =

- King of the Isles
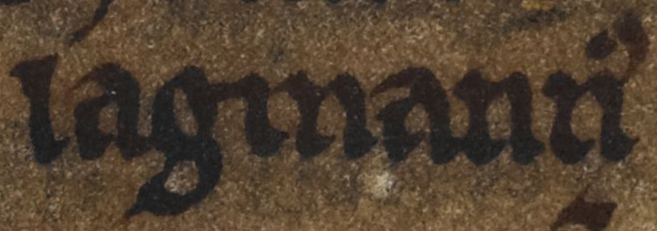
- Lǫgmaðr's name as it appears on folio 33v of British Library Cotton Julius A VII (the Chronicle of Mann): "Lagmannus".
- Reign: 1103–1110
- Predecessor: Sigurd Magnusson
- Successor: Domnall mac Taidc Uí Briain
- Born: 11th century AD
- Dynasty: Crovan dynasty
- Father: Godred Crovan
- Religion: Catholicism

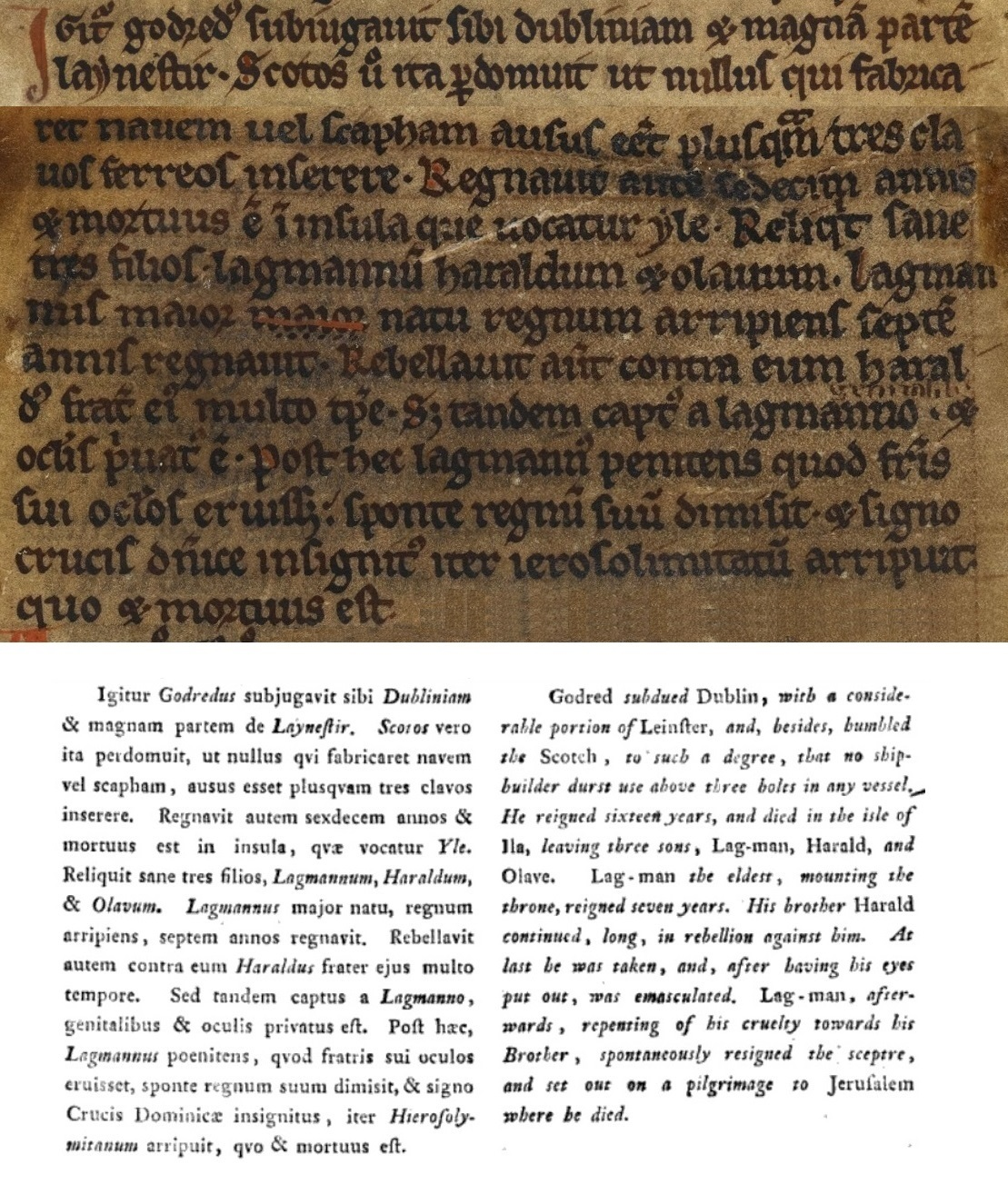
Lagmannus in the Cronica regum Mannie et insularum (1260s) with transcription and English translation (1786)

Lǫgmaðr Guðrøðarson (pronounced [ˈlɒɣmaðr ˈɡuðruðarsson]), also known as Lagmadr and Lagman of the Isle of Man, was a late eleventh-century King of the Isles, whose rise, reign, and fall from power are obscure. (Note: Since the 1980s, academics have accorded Lǫgmaðr various personal names in English secondary sources: Laghmann, Lagman, Lagmann, Lagmannus, Lögmadr, Lögmaðr, Logmaðr, Lǫgmaðr, and Løgmaðr. Likewise, academics have accorded Lǫgmaðr various patronyms in English secondary sources: Lagman Godredsson, Lagman Gudrödsson, Lagmann Godredsson, Lagmann Gofraidsson, Lögmaðr Guðröðarson, and Lǫgmaðr Guðrøðarson. The Gaelic Laghmann / Lagmann is derived from the Old Norse lǫgmaðr ("lawman"). The Old Norse word originally referred to a profession, and was later adopted as a personal name. The name itself is historically found in the Isles as early the tenth century, although not in Scandinavia proper. The name was rather uncommon amongst contemporary Irish families. In 1167, however, the Annals of Ulster record the slaying of a certain member of the Uí Duib Dírma—a branch of the Northern Uí Néill—whose father bore the name. The rarity of this father's name, as well as his apparent floruit, appear to suggest some sort of link with Lǫgmaðr himself. The name was also borne by the eponymous founder of Clann Laghmainn, another apparent Uí Néill kindred. There is reason to suspect that the mother of this thirteenth-century eponym was a daughter of Somairle mac Gilla Brigte, King of the Isles and his wife, Ragnhildr Óláfsdóttir. The latter was a daughter of Lǫgmaðr's youngest brother, Óláfr, a man who also had a son by the name. This possible connection with Lǫgmaðr's family, therefore, may explain why the first chief of Clann Laghmainn bore the name.) He was the eldest son of Guðrøðr Crovan, King of Dublin and the Isles, a Norse-Gaelic dynast who conquered and ruled the kingdoms of the Isles and Dublin, before dying in 1095. Three years after the latter's death, the Isles was conquered by Magnús Óláfsson, King of Norway, whose regime in the region lasted until his death in 1103. The chronology of Lǫgmaðr's reign is uncertain: he may have begun his reign either before Magnús' conquest, during his regime, or after his demise.

As King of the Isles, Lǫgmaðr faced significant opposition from factions supporting his younger brothers, Haraldr and Óláfr. At some point, the Islesmen are reported to have petitioned Muirchertach Ua Briain, King of Munster to select a temporary ruler in the region. This act may have been initiated on behalf of a faction supporting Óláfr. Whatever the case, Ua Briain responded by placing an Uí Briain relative upon the throne. The Uí Briain interlopers, however, do not appear to have been well received; and were evidently ejected by the Islesmen, perhaps led by supporters of Lǫgmaðr himself.

The chronology and circumstances surrounding the conclusion of Lǫgmaðr's reign are uncertain. According to one source, he voluntarily resigned the kingship and journeyed to Jerusalem where he died. This account could be evidence that he died on crusade: one possibility is the First Crusade, perhaps in the entourage of Robert II, Duke of Normandy; another possibility is the so-called Norwegian Crusade, in the entourage of Sigurðr Magnússon, King of Norway. Although one source claims that Lǫgmaðr's trek to the Holy Land was undertaken in remorse for the cruelty he had inflicted upon Haraldr, another possibility is that he was forced into exile instead. Whatever the case, it is apparent that about a decade after Magnús' death, the Crovan dynasty was restored to the kingship in the person of Lǫgmaðr's youngest brother.

== Antecedents, accession, and insurrection ==
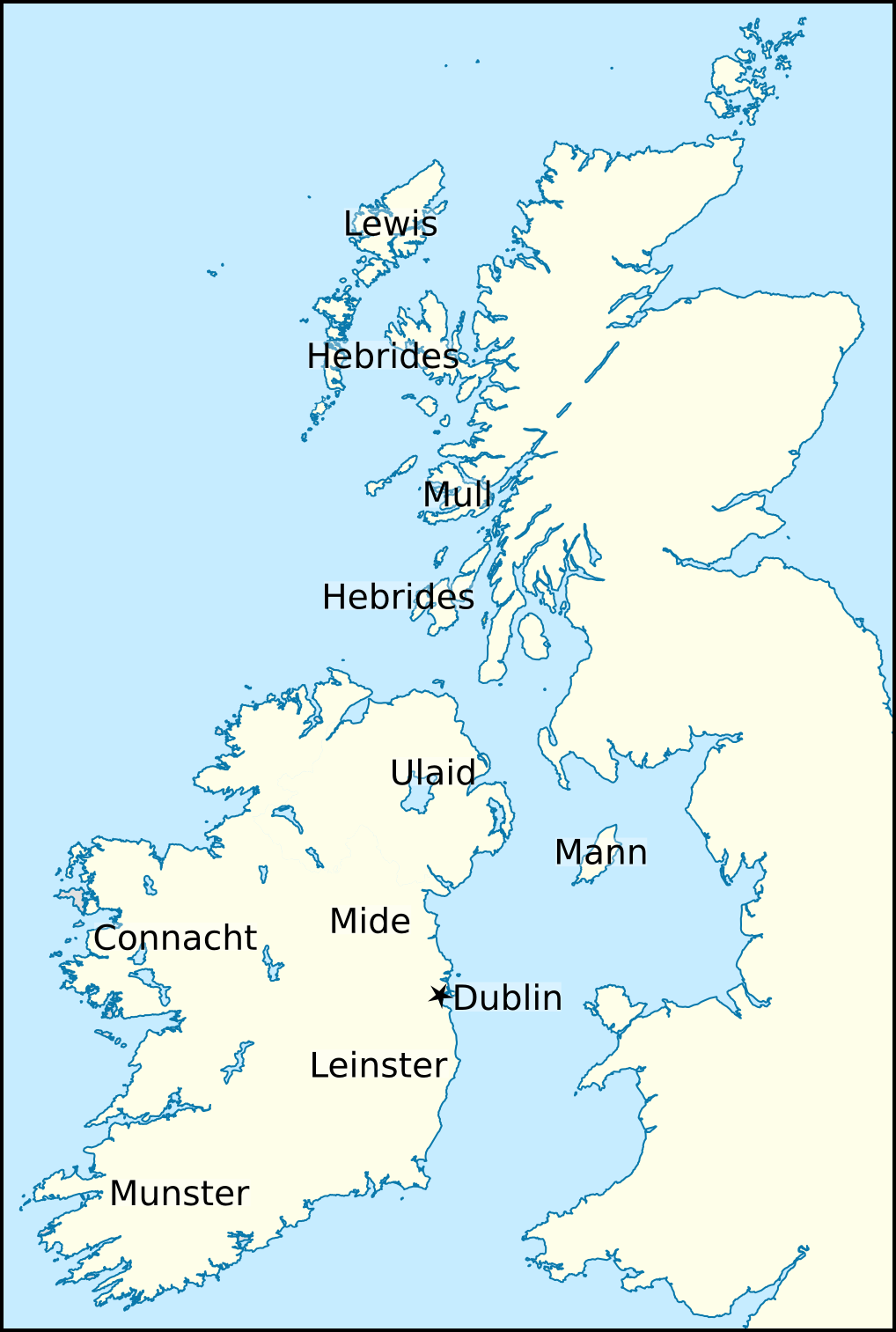
Locations relating to Lǫgmaðr's career.

Lǫgmaðr was one of three sons of Guðrøðr Crovan, King of Dublin and the Isles. Guðrøðr first emerges into history in the mid eleventh century. Although his precise parentage is uncertain, he appears to have been a descendant of Óláfr kváran, King of Northumbria and Dublin. Guðrøðr's apparent Uí Ímair antecedents appear to have endowed him with ancestral claims to the Norse-Gaelic kingdoms to Dublin and the Isles. In the 1070s, he secured the kingship of the Isles through his conquest of Mann, and forcefully added Dublin to his realm in 1091. Guðrøðr's downfall came in 1094, when he was driven out of Ireland by the Uí Briain, and died the following year in the Hebrides.

There is uncertainty concerning the political situation in the Isles in the last decade of the eleventh century. What is known for sure is that, before the end of the century, Magnús Óláfsson, King of Norway led a marauding fleet from Scandinavia into the Isles, seized control of the kingdom, and held onto power in the Irish Sea region until his death in 1103. According to the Chronicle of Mann, when Guðrøðr died in 1095, Lǫgmaðr succeeded him as his eldest son, and went on to reign for seven years. The numerical calculations and chronology of this source are suspect, and it is uncertain if Lǫgmaðr's reign began before Magnús' arrival, during Magnús' overlordship, or even after Magnús' death. One possibility is that Lǫgmaðr commenced his reign in the Isles immediately after his father assumed the kingship of Dublin in 1091. If so, this transfer of power would seem to evidence the eminent status of Dublin's kinship amongst the Norse-Gaelic elite.

Despite the uncertainty surrounding the inception of his reign, the chronicle reveals that Lǫgmaðr faced continued opposition from within his own family in the form of an ongoing rebellion by his brother, Haraldr. Lǫgmaðr eventually overcame Haraldr, however, and is stated to have had the latter blinded and emasculated. Afterwards, if the chronicle is to be believed, Lǫgmaðr repented the cruelty that he had inflicted upon Haraldr, and remorsefully resigned his kingdom, before setting off to Jerusalem, where he died.

== Irish intervention ==
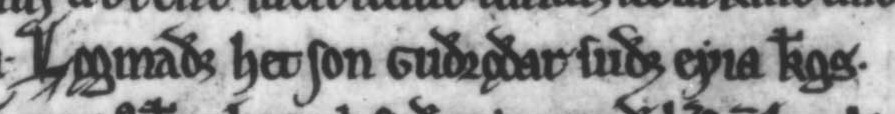
Lǫgmaðr's name as it appears on folio 33v of AM 47 fol (Eirspennill): "Lǫgmaðr het son Guðrǫðar Suðr eyia konvngs". The excerpt describes Lǫgmaðr as the son of Guðrøðr, king of the Suðreyjar—an Old Norse term meaning "Southern Islands", roughly equating to the Hebrides and Mann.

Although the Chronicle of Man maintains that Lǫgmaðr voluntarily vacated his throne, there is reason to suspect that he was forced from power. In about 1096, the chronicle claims that the leading Islesmen sought assistance of Muirchertach Ua Briain, King of Munster, and petitioned him to provide a regent from his own kin to govern the kingdom until Lǫgmaðr's younger brother, Óláfr, was old enough to assume control. The chronicle's account could be evidence that, by about 1096, Lǫgmaðr faced a faction formed around his younger brother; and that, when this faction was unable to topple Lǫgmaðr by itself, it approached Ua Briain for assistance in placing Óláfr upon the throne.

Ua Briain was certainly a formidable potential ally, having recently imposed his dominance over the kingdoms of Connacht, Leinster, Mide, and Dublin as well. In fact, it was through his conquest of the latter that Ua Briain had banished Lǫgmaðr's father from Ireland once and for all, and thereby secured control of Dublin's awesome naval power. In consequence of this predominance, the clause as stated by the chronicle—that Ua Briain was to provide the Isles with a regent from his own kin—may well have been a condition on his intervention, rather than a request of the Islesmen themselves. Whatever the case, the chronicle reveals that Ua Briain then installed Domnall mac Taidc upon the throne. Although Domnall had previously opposed Ua Briain over the kingship of Munster, he was the son of Ua Briain's brother, and further possessed strong familial connections with the Isles through his maternal descent from Echmarcach mac Ragnaill, King of Dublin and the Isles. In fact, the Annals of Ulster appears to indicate that at least two apparent members of Echmarcach's family were killed less than a decade before in a repulsed invasion of Mann. As a result, Domnall may have been the leading male representative of Echmarcach's family. (Note: According to Banshenchas, Domnall's father, Tadc Ua Briain, married Mór, daughter of Echmarcach. The source states that the couple had three sons and a daughter: Donnchad, Domnall, Amlaíb, and Bé Binn. The descendants of Tadc are known as the Meic Taidc.) The slaying of Domnall's brother, Amlaíb, as recorded by the Annals of the Four Masters in 1096, suggests that Domnall and the rest of the Meic Taidc faced significant opposition in the Isles, possibly in the form of Lǫgmaðr's adherents. The chronicle credits Domnall with an oppressive three-year reign that ended when the leading Islesmen revolted against him, and drove him from the kingdom back to Ireland.

== Norwegian domination and diminishment ==
The terrifier of princes captured the lord of North Uist in Skye, and the Scots fled. The leader, whom courage aided, kept King Lǫgmaðr in his company.

— excerpt from Erfikvæði um Magnús berfœttr, by the contemporary skald Gísl Illugason, depicting the capture of Lǫgmaðr ("lord of North Uist") by Magnús ("terrifier of princes").

The extent of Domnall's rule in the kingdom is unknown, and it is questionable whether he had any real authority in the northern Hebrides, furthest from Mann. In about 1097, Magnús sent a delegate named Ingimundr into the Isles to take possession of the kingdom. After installing himself in Lewis, Ingimundr was overthrown and killed whilst attempting to usurp the kingship. Ingimundr's rationale for seating himself upon an island (Lewis and Harris) on the edge of the kingdom may have been due to the fact that he was unable to gain any authority on Mann itself. (Note: Magnúss saga berfœtts, within the thirteenth century Heimskringla, states that Mann was the best of all the Suðreyjar ("Southern Islands").) In fact, the chronicle reveals that civil war erupted there the following year, and the chronicler Orderic Vitalis indicates that Mann was devastated to point of being a virtual desert by the time Magnús appeared on the scene. The warring itself may have been related to the aforesaid factional struggles between Guðrøðr's sons. Although it is possible that it was Magnús who actually forced Domnall from the Isles, the fact the chronicle makes no mention of Domnall during the recorded conflict on Mann may be evidence that he had lost control of the island by then. Within the year, the same source records the arrival of Magnús himself, which could suggest that it was Ingimundr's slaying, at the hands of the Islesmen, that had incited Magnús to take matters into his own hands.

Every hiding place that Guðrøðr's heir had was hazardous; the ruler of the Þrœndir refused Lǫgmaðr lands there. The bountiful young lord of the Egðir captured the destroyer of the snake-lair off the headlands, where tongues of hilts were wailing.

— excerpt from Magnússdrápa, by the contemporary skald Bjǫrn krepphendi, depicting the capture of Lǫgmaðr ("Guðrøðr's heir") by Magnús ("ruler of the Þrœndir", "lord of the Egðir").

Magnús' takeover of the Isles is colourfully depicted in the chronicle, and several mediaeval Scandinavian sources, such as the early thirteenth-century Morkinskinna, Fagrskinna, Orkneyinga saga, and Magnúss saga berfœtts within the early thirteenth-century saga-compilation Heimskringla. As the Norwegian fleet descended upon the Isles, the latter source specifies that Lǫgmaðr set himself to defend the Norðreyjum ("Northern Islands"), a term that likely refers to the Outer Hebrides. (Note: The Old Norse Norðreyjar usually refers to the Northern Isles, as opposed to the Isles (the Hebrides and Mann) which are called Suðreyjar ("Southern Islands").) A particular verse of poetry in Morkinskinna, attributed to the contemporary skald Gísl Illugason, describes Lǫgmaðr as "Ívistar gram" ("Prince of Uist", or "Lord of Uist"). (Note: Another interpretation of "Ívistar gram" is "Lord of North Uist". although this translation of Ívistar to "North Uist" may be too specific. Uist, itself, refers to three main Outer Hebridean islands: North Uist, Benbecula, and South Uist.) This title not only appears to corroborate Lǫgmaðr's authority in the northern Isles, but could also indicate that he was primarily based on Uist as well.

At several points in the history of the Isles, the realm endured periods of fragmentation between rival factions. Whether the references to Lǫgmaðr in the north are evidence of a similarly partitioned kingdom is unknown. The Norwegian subjugation of the Isles, and subsequent capture of Lǫgmaðr, are recounted by several sources. For instance, Orkneyinga saga states as much; whilst Morkinskinna further specifies that Lǫgmaðr fled southwards and out to sea, as Magnús' fleet advanced, only to be captured and kept in the Norwegian king's company for some time afterwards.

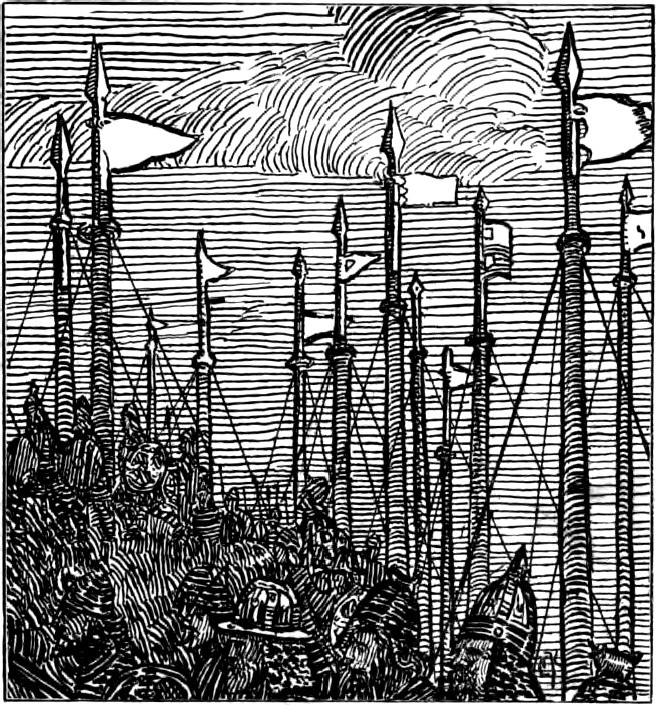
Nineteenth-century depiction of Magnús Óláfsson's forces in Ireland. (Note: The illustration depicts Magnús' troops setting forth from their ships at sunrise. Magnús' invasion and conquest of the Isles was evidently long-remembered in the Isles, as Magnús appears in modern Hebridean folk tradition. Lǫgmaðr too appears in traditional ballads as Laomunn Mór (and variously designated Mac Coineal, Laomunn mór mac an Nuamhfhir, mac Righ nuaidh, and Laomunn mac Roidh). In one ballad, this character is described as: "A hero who put Alba under tribute / By the strength of his two hands and his feats".)

Having overwintered in Isles, Magnús left for Norway in the summer, only to make his return nearly four years later, in 1102 or 1103. Once re-established on Mann, Magnús entered into an alliance with Ua Briain, formalised through the marriage between Magnús's young son, Sigurðr, and Ua Briain's daughter, Bjaðmunjo. Magnús, therefore, appears to have intended for Sigurðr to rule over his recently won territories. Unfortunately for Ua Briain, and his long-term ambitions in Ireland and the Isles, Magnús was slain in Ulster in 1103, whereupon Sigurðr immediately repudiated his bride and returned to Norway. Although Ua Briain was able to regain control of Dublin, and still held considerable influence in the Isles, Magnús' death appears to have left a power vacuum in the region that he was unable to fill.

In 1111, Domnall mac Taidc appears to have forcefully seized the kingship of the Isles. Although it is possible that he had backing from Ua Briain himself, there is evidence to suggest that made his move without Ua Briain's consent. Not long after this undertaking, Domnall appears to have been either forced from the Isles, or drawn back to Ireland in an attempt to capitalise on Ua Briain's failing health, only to be slain himself in 1115. The encroachment of competing Irish factions into the Isles may well have been as unpalatable to the English and Scots as the power vacuum left in the wake of Magnús' demise. Since the chronicle records that the subsequent reign of Óláfr lasted forty years, the latter's accession to the kingship appears to date to about 1112 or 1113, not long after Domnall launched his bid for the throne. In fact, the chronicle indicates that Óláfr spent his youth at the court of Henry I, King of England, and it appears that this restoration of the Crovan dynasty, in the person of Lǫgmaðr's youngest brother, was the work of the English king.

== Departure and death ==
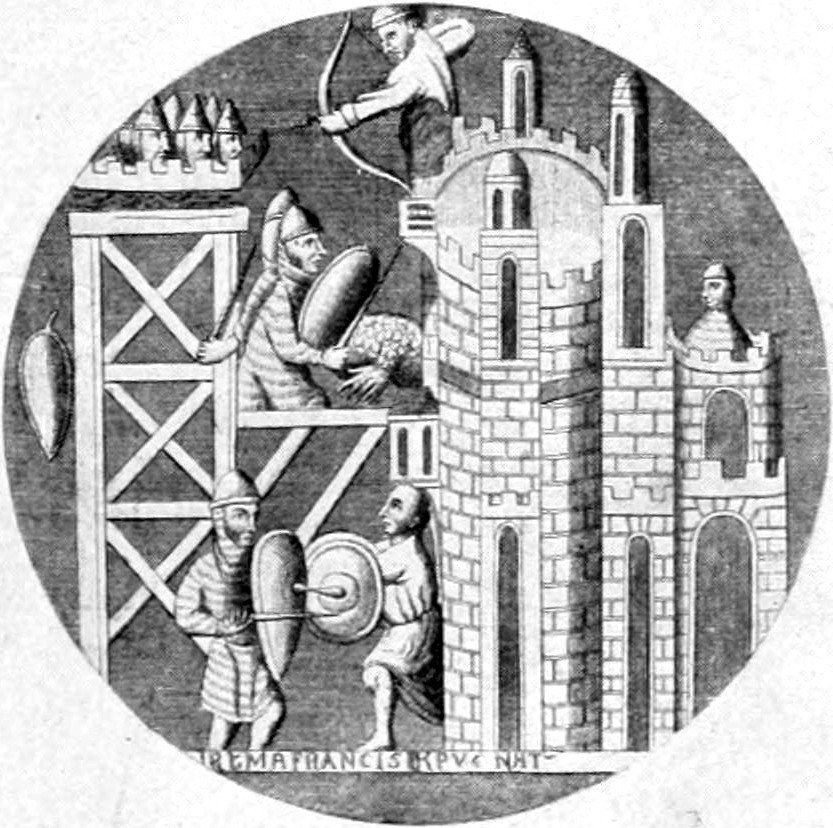
Eighteenth-century illustration of a now-lost twelfth-century stained glass window of the Basilica of St Denis, Paris. The window depicted the crusader's capture of Jerusalem, the climax of the First Crusade.

Late in 1095, Pope Urban II first proclaimed an armed pilgrimage, or penitential holy war, that led to the First Crusade of 1096–1102. Before the end of the year, tens of thousands of men, women, and children answered his call to re-establish Christian control of Jerusalem. The particular terminology employed by the Chronicle of Mann—that Lǫgmaðr departed the kingdom "marked with the sign of the Lord's cross"—suggests that he participated in a crusade. On the other hand, since the chronicle was compiled in the thirteenth century, during a period when the idea of a cross-bearing pilgrim was well established, it is possible that this depiction of Lǫgmaðr has been contaminated by anachronistic conceptions.

There are many reasons why crusaders volunteered to "take the cross". One particular reason was the desire of repentance. Remorse for the cruelty that he had inflicted upon his own brother may well have played a part in Lǫgmaðr's decision. On the other hand, another possibility is that, instead of embarking upon an armed crusade, Lǫgmaðr merely intended to earn a pardon by way of a penitential pilgrimage to Jerusalem. Embarking upon a crusade could also be a means of escaping political tribulations and pressure at home, as in the case of the embattled Robert II, Duke of Normandy. In Lǫgmaðr's case, his participation may have been a direct after-effect of Magnús' conquest of the Isles in 1098, or the aforesaid later revival of Uí Briain encroachment in Dublin and the Isles.

If Lǫgmaðr was indeed a crusader, it is uncertain which particular crusade he undertook. One possibility is that he took part in the First Crusade, a movement that reached its climax with the successful siege and capture of Jerusalem in mid 1099. Lǫgmaðr could have embarked upon this enterprise in about 1096, the year the pope's calls reached England, and perhaps joined Robert's assembling forces that summer. Alternately, in light of Lǫgmaðr's capture by the Norwegians in 1098, it is conceivable that his release from custody was made conditional upon his exile and participation in the First Crusade. On the other hand, it is not impossible that Lǫgmaðr originally undertook a pilgrimage before catching wind of the crusade en route. Whatever the case, if Lǫgmaðr indeed participated and perished in the First Crusade, he may have met his end on campaign in Syria or Anatolia. (Note: In the early twentieth century, excavations at Rushen Abbey uncovered a grave that was identified as that of Lǫgmaðr. Consequently dubbed "Lagman's Grave", the excavation contained two bronze brooches or buckles that were originally thought to date to the eleventh century, as well as a figurine of Osiris, an Ancient Egyptian god. More recent analysis, however, has revealed that the brooches/buckles and grave likely date to the thirteenth century, and that the figurine's association with the skeleton is dubious.)

Another possibility is that Lǫgmaðr regained some form of control in the Isles following Magnús' death, and afterwards joined Sigurðr's expedition to Holy Land in the first decade of the twelfth century. Whether Sigurðr's undertaking was a planned crusade per se, or merely an eventful and violent pilgrimage, is debatable. The precise chronology of this enterprise is similarly uncertain, although the Norwegian fleet certainly reached England before the end of the first decade of the twelfth century. (Note: The twelfth-century Gesta regum Anglorum states that Sigurðr sailed to Jerusalem by way of England. According to Annales Radingenses, Sigurðr visited England in 1108.) It may have been at this point, whilst Sigurðr overwintered at the English royal court, that Lǫgmaðr joined up with him. If Lǫgmaðr and Sigurðr indeed rendezvoused in England, this may have been the time when Óláfr, the future King of the Isles, was entrusted to the safekeeping of the English king.
