= Chronicles of Mann =

Medieval chronicle of the Isle of Mann

Chronicles of the Kings of Mann and the Isles
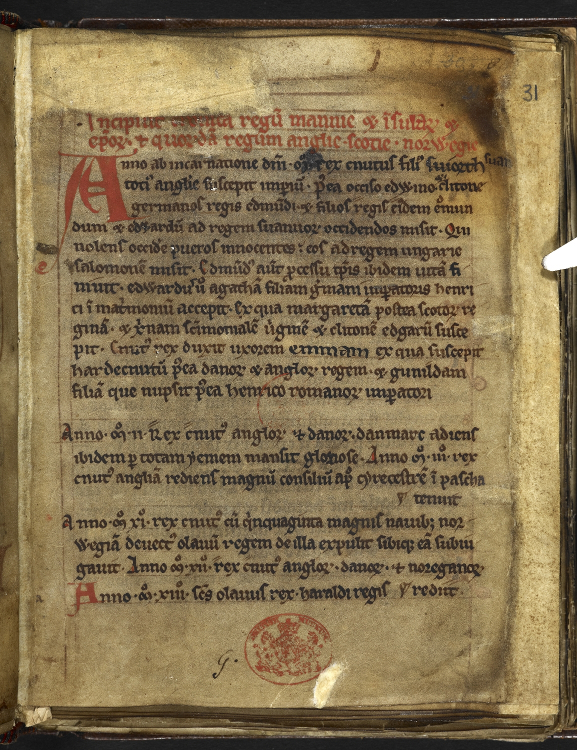
- The first page of the Chronicles of Mann; from BL Cotton MS Julius A. VII, f. 31r
- Created: ca. 1262
- Location: British Library in London

The Chronicles of the Kings of Mann and the Isles (Latin: Chronica Regum Manniæ et Insularum) or Manx Chronicle is a medieval Latin manuscript relating the early history of the Isle of Man.

== Dating ==
The main part of the manuscript is believed to have been composed and written in 1261 or 1262 at Rushen Abbey on the island, shortly after the time of the Cistercian abbey's dedication in 1257, which is the final event retold by the original scribe. The manuscript is written in ink on vellum, with pages roughly 15 cm (6 in) by 20 cm (8 in).

== Contents ==
The Chronicles are a look back, year-by-year from 1016, over the significant events in Manx history of that time. Written in Latin, it records the island's role as the centre of the Norse Kingdom of Mann and the Isles, and the influence of its kings and religious leaders, as well as the role of Rushen Abbey itself – which was founded at the invitation of Olaf I Godredsson, one of the Norse kings. The original scribe also wrote a list of popes (ff. 3r-14r) which ends with Pope Urban IV (1261–4). It is probable that the Chronicles were written for the new abbey on its foundation.

Entries for the earlier years are notably shorter than those towards the end of the original section of the manuscript, no doubt due to later events having occurred within living memory of the time of writing, and thus more detail being available. Many of the dates of the earlier annals are put around 15 years earlier than the actual event, and none of these entries before 1047 are directly related to the Isle of Man, having been copied from a source shared with the Chronicle of Melrose.

Several further notes were later added by the abbey's Cistercian monks, taking the Chronicles up to 1316. The manuscript also contains a copy of Bonizo of Sutri's Cronica Romanorum pontificum (ff. 15r-30r) and a territorial survey (ff. 53r-54v). A record of the bishops of the Western Isles to John Donkan (Bishop of Man and the Isles from 1374 to 1387) is appended to the Chronicles.

== Provenance ==
After the abbey was dissolved in 1540, the manuscript is thought to have passed through a number of private hands until being presented by Roger Dodsworth (d. 1654) to Sir Robert Cotton (d. 1631) in 1620/1. Cotton's collection of medieval and early modern manuscripts was one of the founding collections of the British Museum and is now cared for by the British Library in London.

== Repatriation ==
There have been campaigns to move the Chronicles permanently to the Isle of Man.

== Outline ==
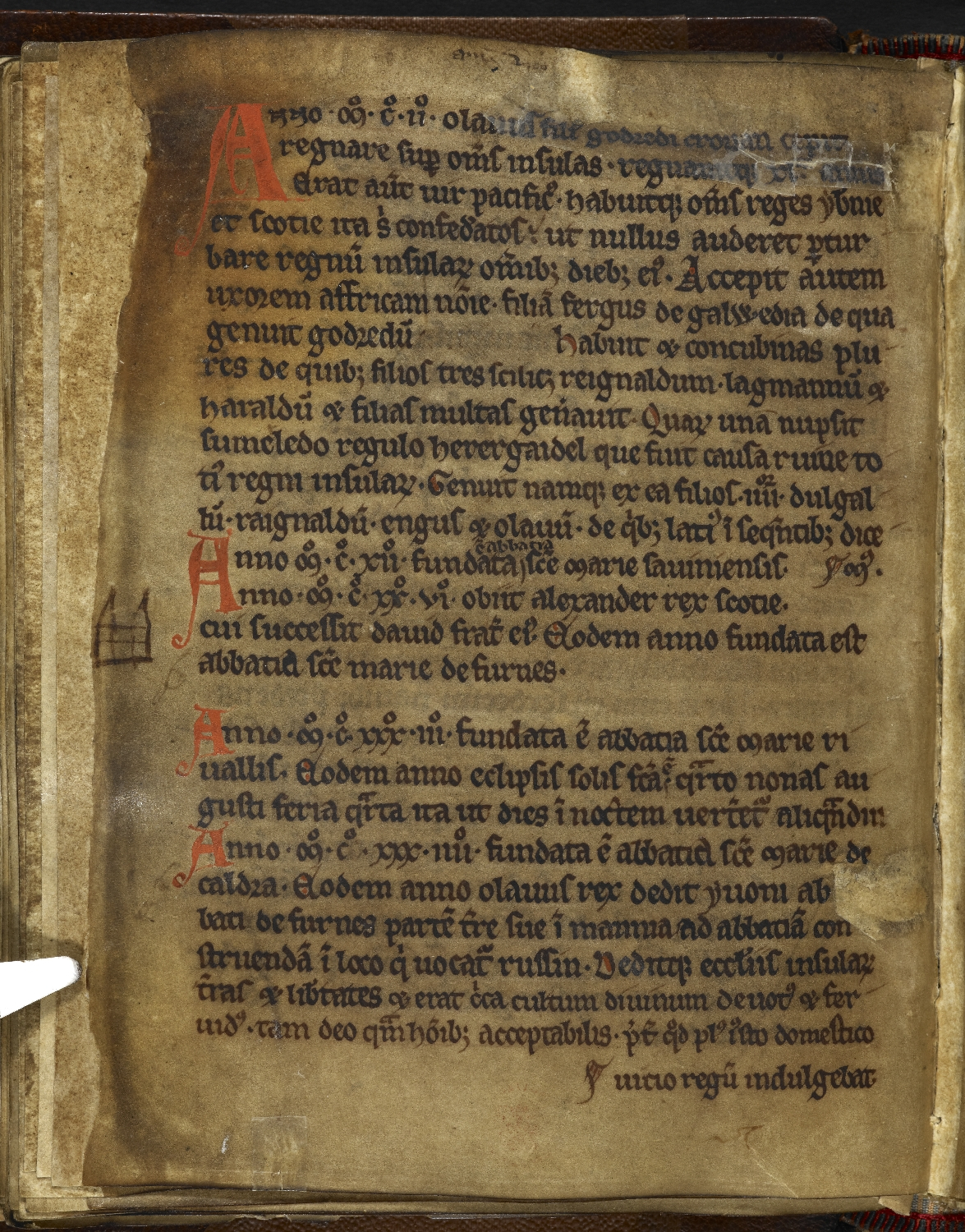
The foundation of Rushen Abbey, 1134, in the Chronicles of Mann, from BL Cotton MS Julius A. VII, f. 35v

- 1016–1030: King Canute's marriage to Emma, the birth of their son Harthacanute, and Canute's journeys to Denmark and Norway.
- 1031–1066: Foundation of Bury St. Edmunds Abbey, and the death of Canute. Death of King Edward the Confessor.
- 1066–1079: Battle of Stamford Bridge, William the Conqueror's victory at the Battle of Hastings. Conquest of the Isle of Man by Godred Crovan.
- 1079–1098: Foundation of the Cistercian order at Cîteaux in France.
- 1102–1152: Commencement of reign of King Olaf. Foundations of Savigny Abbey, Furness Abbey, Rievaulx Abbey, Calder Abbey, Melrose Abbey, and Holme Cultram Abbey. Grant of land at Rushen to Furness Abbey by King Olaf.
- 1165–1187: Murder of Thomas Becket at Canterbury Cathedral. Capture of Jerusalem by Saladin. Visit by a papal legate to the Isle of Man. Marriage of King Godred, conducted by the Abbot of Rievaulx.
- 1228–1237: Death of King Olaf on St Patrick's Isle, and burial at Rushen Abbey.
- 1250–1256: Start of reign of King Magnus
- 1256–1274: Completion of the Abbey Church of St Mary's at Rushen, and dedication by Richard, Bishop of Sodor and Man.
- List of Bishops: A list of the Bishops of the Diocese of Sodor and Man until Simon Orcadensis, who had died in 1248. The bishop at the time of the writing of the manuscript, Richard, was not included.

== Editions and translations ==
- Broderick, G. (ed. and tr.). The Chronicles of the Kings of Mann and the Isles. 2nd ed. Douglas, 1995.
- Munch, P.A. (ed.) and Rev. Alexander Goss (tr.). Chronica regnum Manniae et insularum. The Chronicle of Man and the Sudreys. 2 vols. Manx Society 22–3. Douglas, 1874. Available in html
