= Óláfr Guðrøðarson (died 1153) =

King of the Isles (?-1153)

- King of the Isles
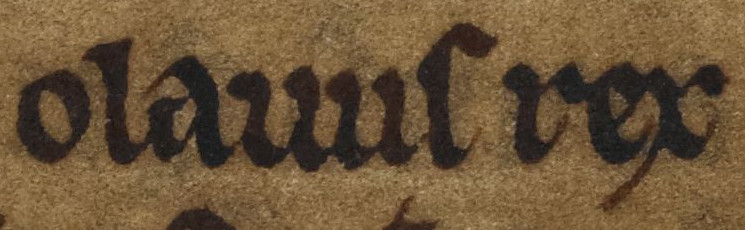
- Óláfr's name and title as it appears on folio 35v. of British Library Cotton Julius A VII (the Chronicle of Mann): "Olavus rex".
- Reign: 1112/1115–1153
- Predecessor: Domnall mac Taidc
- Successor: Guðrøðr Óláfsson
- Died: 29 June 1153; Mann
- Wives: Ingibjǫrg Hákonardóttir; Affraic ingen Fergusa
- Issue: sons Guðrøðr, Rǫgnvaldr, Lǫgmaðr, and Haraldr; several daughters including Ragnhildr
- House: Crovan dynasty
- Father: Guðrøðr Crovan

Óláfr Guðrøðarson (died 29 June 1153) was a twelfth-century King of Mann and the Isles. (Note: Since the 1990s, academics have accorded Óláfr various personal names in English secondary sources: Amhlaibh, Amhlaoibh, Amlaíb, Amlaim, Olaf, Óláf, Olafr, Ólafr, Óláfr, and Olav. Likewise, academics have accorded Óláfr various patronyms in English secondary sources: Amhlaíbh Derg mac Gofhraidh, Amlaíb mac Gofraid Méránaich, Amlaíb mac Gofraid, Olaf Godredsson, Olaf Gudrodson, Óláf Guðrøðsson, Óláfr bitlingr Guðrøðsson, Olafr Godredsson, Óláfr Godredsson, Óláfr Gothfrithsson, Óláfr Guðrǫðarson, Óláfr Guðröðarson, Ólafr Guðrøðarson, Óláfr Guðrøðarson, Óláfr Guðrøðarsson, Óláfr Guðrøðson, Óláfr Guthfrithsson. and Olav Gudrødsson Bitling. Similarly, academics had accorded Óláfr various epithets in English secondary sources: Amhlaíbh Derg mac Gofhraidh, Amlaíb 'the Red', Amlaíb Derg, Olaf Bitling, Olaf Kleining, Olaf the Diminutive, Olaf the Red, Olaf "the Red", Olaf Titbit, Óláfr Bitling, Óláfr bitlingr Guðrøðsson, Óláfr Bitlingr, Óláfr klíningr Guðrøðarson, Ólafr Suðreyjakonungr, Óláfr Titbit, and Olav Gudrødsson Bitling. Óláfr is accorded several epithets in important mediaeval primary sources. The thirteenth-century Orkneyinga saga accords him the Old Norse byname bitlingr, which can translate to "bit", "the diminutive", "little-bit", "morsel", "tit-bit". The Old Norse byname klíningr, which can translate to "Buttered Cake", "buttered bread", is accorded to Óláfr by Hákonar saga herðibreiðs within the thirteenth-century saga-compilation Heimskringla. If these two epithets refer to Óláfr's stature, in the sense of "the small one" or "the little one", it is possible that they either refer in a literal sense to the small stature, or in an ironical sense to great height. Another epithet, "the Red", is accorded to Óláfr by the seventeenth-century Sleat History. This name contrasts "the black", the translation of an epithet accorded to his like-named grandson, Óláfr Guðrøðarson, King of the Isles.) As a younger son of Guðrøðr Crovan, King of Dublin and the Isles, Óláfr witnessed a vicious power struggle between his elder brothers in the aftermath of their father's death. At some point, the young Óláfr was entrusted to the care of Henry I, King of England, and like the contemporaneous Scottish monarchs, Alexander I and David I, Óláfr appears to have been a protégé of the English king. As King of the Isles, Óláfr contracted marital alliances with neighbouring maritime rulers. Although he appears to have overseen successful military operations to reclaim the northernmost territories once controlled by his father, he may have witnessed the loss of authority in Galloway as well. Like his counterpart David I, Óláfr was a reformer and moderniser of his realm. However, his four-decade reign ended in abrupt disaster when he was assassinated by three nephews in 1153. Following the ensuing power struggle, Óláfr's son Guðrøðr overcame the kin-slayers, and assumed the kingship of the Kingdom of the Isles.

The Isles—an archipelagic region roughly incorporating the Hebrides and Mann—was ruled by Guðrøðr Crovan for over two decades until his death in 1095, whereupon his eldest son Lǫgmaðr assumed control. Warring soon broke out between factions supporting Lǫgmaðr's younger brother Haraldr, which led to the intervention and encroachment of Irish power into the region. After a short period of Irish domination, the region lapsed into further conflict which was capitalised on by Magnús Óláfsson, King of Norway, who led two military campaigns throughout the Isles and surrounding Irish Sea region at about the turn of the twelfth century. Magnús dominated these regions until his death in 1103, whereupon control of the Isles appears to have fragmented into chaos once again.

Rather than allow ambitious Irish powers fill the power vacuum, Henry I appears to have installed Óláfr on the throne at some point between 1112 and 1115, about the time that Domnall mac Taidc relocated from the Isles to Ireland. Óláfr is recorded to have spent his youth at Henry I's court, and Óláfr's later religious foundations reveal that he was greatly influenced by his English upbringing. In the second quarter of the eleventh century, Óláfr founded Rushen Abbey, a reformed religious house on Mann. He further oversaw the formation of the Diocese of the Isles, the territorial extent of which appears to reveal the boundaries of his realm. Óláfr is recorded to have had at least two wives: Ingibjǫrg, daughter of Hákon Pálsson, Earl of Orkney; and Affraic, daughter of Fergus, Lord of Galloway. The unions seem to reveal that Óláfr shifted from an alliance with Orkney to that with Galloway. Not long after his marriage to Affraic, one of Óláfr's daughters married Somairle mac Gilla Brigte, Lord of Argyll, an emerging power in the region.

Although Óláfr's reign is recorded to have been peaceful, there is reason to suspect that his own succession was uncertain. In 1152, Guðrøðr travelled to Norway and rendered homage to Ingi Haraldsson, King of Norway. At about this time, the Diocese of the Isles was incorporated within the recently elevated Archdiocese of Niðaróss. Whilst this strengthened Norwegian links with the Isles, it secured the ecclesiastical independence of Óláfr's domain, and safeguard his secular authority in the region. Nevertheless, before Guðrøðr returned to the Isles, three sons of Haraldr confronted Óláfr, and demanded a share of the kingdom before slaying him. Although the three men appear to have taken significant steps to counter military intervention from Galloway, they were soon after crushed by Guðrøðr, who returned to the region strengthened by Norwegian military might. Óláfr's descendants went on to reign as kings of the Isles for over a century.

== Background ==
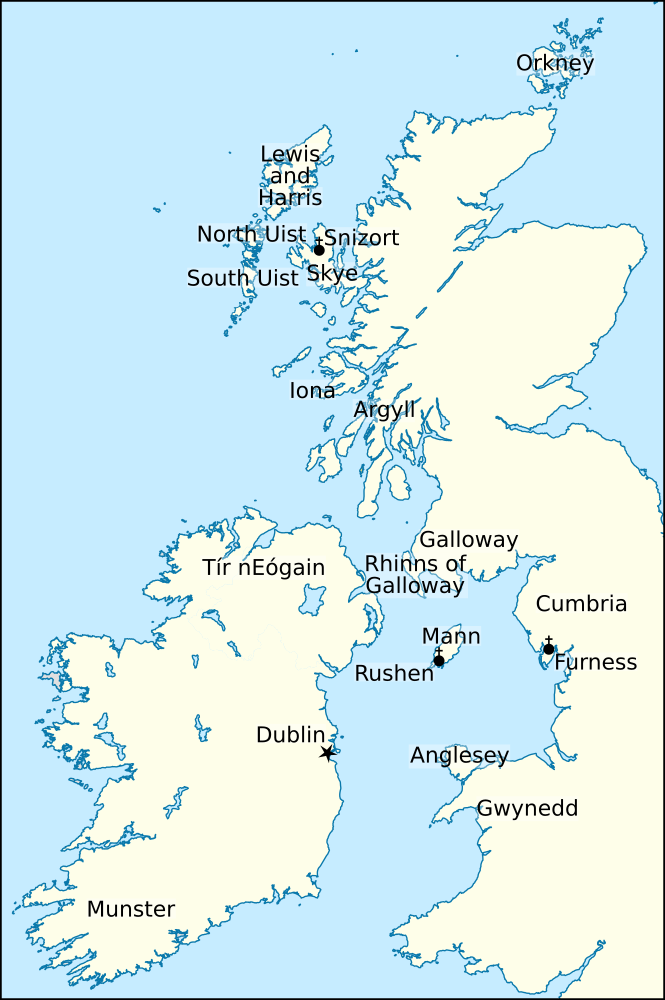
Locations relating to Óláfr's life and times.

Óláfr was a member of the Crovan dynasty. He was a son of this family's eponymous ancestor, Guðrøðr Crovan, King of Dublin and the Isles. Others sons of Guðrøðr Crovan include Lǫgmaðr and Haraldr. Óláfr's father appears to have secured the kingship of the Isles in the late 1070s, and to have seized the kingship of Dublin in the early 1090s. Guðrøðr Crovan's downfall came in 1094 when he was forced from Ireland altogether by Muirchertach Ua Briain, King of Munster. There is reason to suspect that Guðrøðr Crovan was driven from Mann as well, since he is recorded to have died on Islay the following year.

According to the thirteenth- to fourteenth-century Chronicle of Mann, Guðrøðr Crovan's eldest son, Lǫgmaðr, succeeded to the kingship of the Isles. The chronicle further reveals that Lǫgmaðr faced opposition from within his own family in the form of a rebellion by his brother, Haraldr. Lǫgmaðr eventually overcame Haraldr, however, and is stated to have had him blinded and emasculated. Afterwards, Lǫgmaðr appears to have faced further opposition in the form of a faction supporting his youngest brother, Óláfr. Apparently unable to overthrow Lǫgmaðr on their own, the dissidents turned to Muirchertach, whose recent conquest of Dublin gave him control of that realm's dominating naval forces.

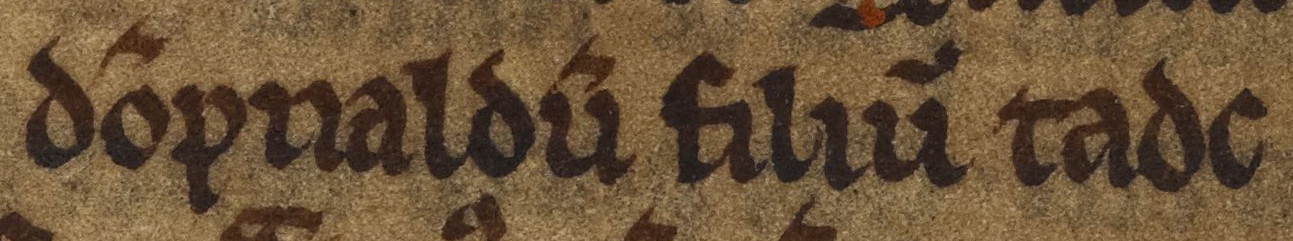
The name of Domnall mac Taidc as it appears on folio 33v of British Library Cotton Julius A VII (the Chronicle of Mann): "Dompnaldum filium Tadc".

If the chronicle is to be believed, Óláfr's supporters petitioned Muirchertach to provide a regent from his own kin—the Uí Briain—to govern the Isles until Óláfr was old enough to assume control himself. Such a clause may well have been a condition of Muirchertach's involvement, rather than a request. Nevertheless, the chronicle indicates that Muirchertach installed his nephew, Domnall mac Taidc, upon the throne. Although Domnall had previously opposed Muirchertach over the kingship of Munster, he was the son of Muirchertach's brother, and further possessed strong familial connections with the Isles through his maternal descent from Echmarcach mac Ragnaill, King of Dublin and the Isles. Regardless, the death of Domnall's brother, Amlaíb, recorded by the seventeenth-century Annals of the Four Masters in 1096, suggests that Domnall and the rest of the Meic Taidc faced significant opposition in the Isles, possibly in the form of Lǫgmaðr's adherents. Domnall's reign appears to have been brief. The chronicle's account of warfare on the island in about 1097–1098 fails to mention him at all, a fact which seems to be evidence that he had lost control by then.

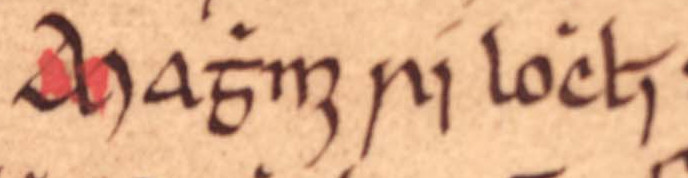
The name and title of Magnús Óláfsson as it appears on folio 46v of Oxford Bodleian Library Rawlinson B 489 (the Annals of Ulster).

Probably late in 1097, Magnús Óláfsson, King of Norway turned his attention towards the Isles, and sent a certain Ingimundr into the region to take control on his behalf. Unfortunately for Magnús, Ingimundr was soon after slain on Lewis and Harris by leading Islesmen. The following year Magnús took matters into his own hands, and led an invasion-fleet of his into the area. As the invaders successfully carved their way through the Isles towards Mann, Lǫgmaðr was evidently overcome and captured. From Mann, the Norwegians campaigned against the English in Anglesey. Although Magnúss saga berfœtts, within the thirteenth century Heimskringla, places this particular episode in the context of Norwegian conquest, it is likely that Magnús had merely assumed the same protector role that Óláfr's father had once filled with Gruffudd ap Cynan, King of Gwynedd. Magnús gained the submission of Galloway, and may have consolidated his campaign through a treaty with Edgar, King of Scotland.

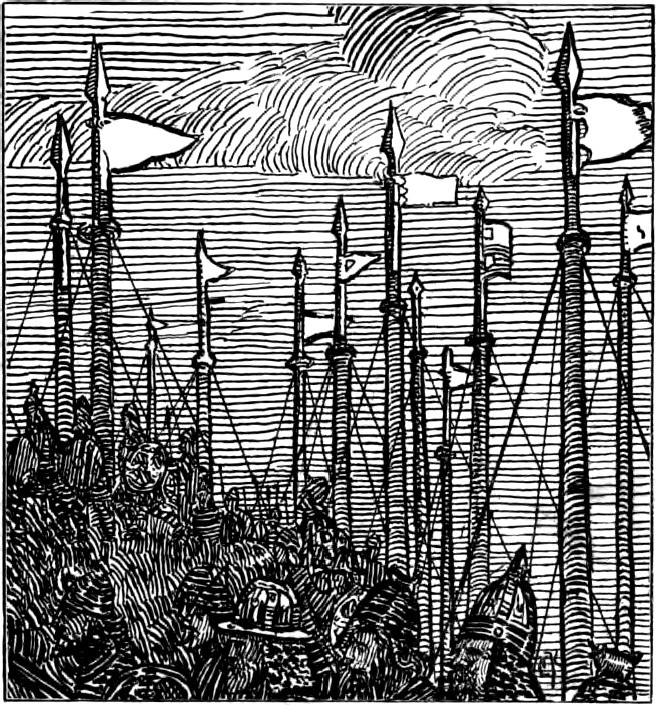
Nineteenth-century depiction of Magnús Óláfsson's forces in Ireland. (Note: The illustration depicts Magnús' troops setting forth from their ships at sunrise.)

Magnús overwintered in the Isles, and left for Norway in the summer. He made his return to the region, nearly four years later, in 1102 or 1103. After reestablishing himself on Mann, Magnús entered into a marital alliance with Muirchertach formalised through the marriage between Magnús's young son, Sigurðr, and Muirchertach's young daughter, Bjaðmunjo. The fact that Magnús intended to return to Norway reveals that Muirchertach benefited to most from the arrangement, although the alliance appears to have bound the kings against a common enemy in the region, Domnall Mac Lochlainn, King of Cenél nEógain. Unfortunately for Muirchertach, and his long-term ambitions in the Isles, Magnús was slain in Ulster in 1103, and Sigurðr immediately repudiated his bride and returned to Norway. Although Muirchertach was able to regain control of Dublin and still had held considerable influence in the Isles, Magnús' death left a vacuum which neither Muirchertach nor Domnall Mac Lochlainn could fill. (Note: According to Magnúss saga berfœtts, Magnús' epithets berfœttr ("barefoot") and berbeinn ("bare-legged") refer to the clothing that he and his men adopted from the natives during their time spent west overseas (in Vestrlǫnd, the "Western Lands"). Specifically, the saga states that they went bare-legged in the streets, and wore short tunics and overcoats. This source also accords Magnús two other epithets: hávi ("the tall"), and Styrjaldar- ("Warfare", or "Age of Unrest" in reference to war).)

== Restoration of the Crovan dynasty ==
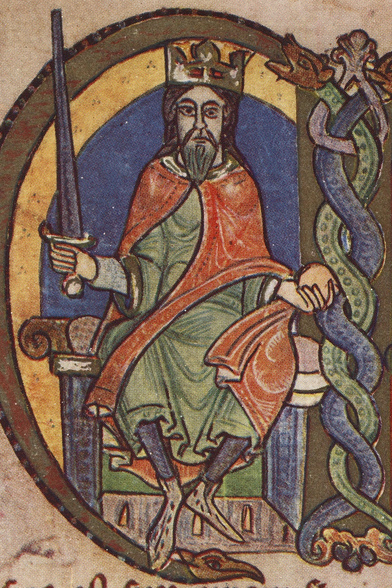
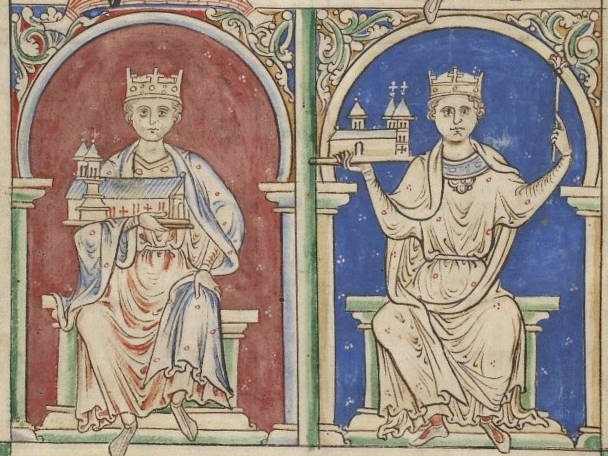
Twelfth- and thirteenth-century depictions of kings David I (left), Henry I (middle), and Stephen (right), neighbouring rulers whom Óláfr enjoyed amiable relations during his forty-year reign. (Note: The portrait of David I is depicted by an illuminated twelfth-century charter of his son, Malcolm IV, King of Scotland. The portraits of Henry I and Stephen are depicted upon folio 8v of the thirteenth-century British Library Royal 14 C VII (Historia Anglorum).)

If the Chronicle of Mann is to be believed, at one point in his career Lǫgmaðr repented the cruelty that he had inflicted upon Haraldr, and remorsefully resigned his kingdom before setting off to Jerusalem where he died. The particular terminology employed by the chronicle—that Lǫgmaðr departed the kingdom "marked with the sign of the Lord's cross"—suggests that he participated in a crusade. On the other hand, since the chronicle was compiled in the thirteenth century, during a period when the idea of a cross-bearing pilgrim was well established, it is possible that this depiction of Lǫgmaðr has been contaminated by anachronistic conceptions.

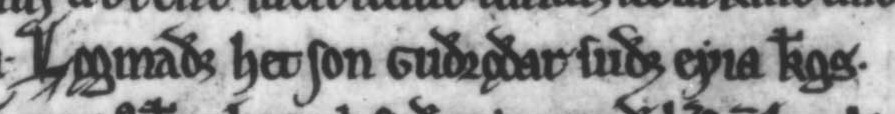
The name of Lǫgmaðr Guðrøðarson as it appears on folio 33v of AM 47 fol (Eirspennill): "Lǫgmaðr het son Guðrǫðar Suðr eyia konvngs". The excerpt describes Lǫgmaðr as the son of Guðrøðr Crovan, king of the Suðreyjar—an Old Norse term meaning "Southern Islands", roughly equating to the Hebrides and Mann.

If Lǫgmaðr was indeed a crusader, it is uncertain which particular crusade he undertook. One possibility is that he took part in the First Crusade, a movement that reached its climax with the successful siege and capture of Jerusalem in mid 1099. Lǫgmaðr could have embarked upon this enterprise in about 1096, the year the pope's calls reached England. Alternately, in light of Lǫgmaðr's capture by the Norwegians in 1098, it is conceivable that his release from custody was made conditional upon his exile and participation in the First Crusade. On the other hand, it is not impossible that Lǫgmaðr originally undertook a pilgrimage before catching wind of the crusade en route.

Another possibility is that Lǫgmaðr regained some form of control in the Isles following Magnús' death, and afterwards joined Sigurðr's expedition to Holy Land in the first decade of the twelfth century. The precise chronology of this enterprise is uncertain, although the Norwegian fleet certainly reached England before the end of the first decade of the twelfth century. It may have been at this point, whilst Sigurðr overwintered at the English royal court, that Lǫgmaðr joined up with him. If Lǫgmaðr and Sigurðr indeed rendezvoused in England, this may have been the time when Óláfr was entrusted to the safekeeping of the English king. (Note: Sigurðr's Old Norse epithet Jórsalafari ("Jerusalem-farer") refers to this crusade. According to Magnússona saga within Heimskringla, Sigurðr assisted Baldwin I, King of Jerusalem in the Siege of Sidon. If Lǫgmaðr participated in the First Crusade, he may have perished on campaign in Syria and Anatolia.) Certainly, the chronicle reveals that Óláfr was brought up at the English court. The reason why he was entrusted into the care of the English may have been because Henry I was thought to have been the only monarch who could guarantee Óláfr's safety. (Note: Several sons of prominent men are known to have been raised at Henry I's court. One was Brian fitz Count, illegitimate son of Alan IV, Duke of Brittany. Another was Raymond, son of the Count of Poitou.)

The name of Havelok the Dane name as it appears on folio 207v of Oxford Bodleian Library Laud Miscellaneous 108: "Haueloc". This literary character may have been first crafted because of Óláfr's presence at the English court.

A probable tenth-century ancestor of Óláfr was the Uí Ímair dynast Óláfr kváran, King of Northumbria and Dublin, This man was likely the prototype of the mediaeval literary character variously known as Havelok the Dane. (Note: This character is accorded two names: various forms of Havelok and Cuaran. The first name is cognate to a Celtic form of the Old Norse personal name Óláfr, the second corresponds to the Gaelic epithet cúarán ("shoe", "sandal", possibly in reference to a boot). Only one historical personage is known to have borne both names: Óláfr kváran, a dominant figure in northern Britain and the Irish Sea region.) The earliest surviving source detailing Havelok is the twelfth-century Estoire des Engleis. The catalyst for Óláfr kváran's incorporation into twelfth-century English literature may have been Óláfr's stay at the court of Henry I. Conceivably, writers may have sought out the patronage of the young Óláfr by borrowing tales of his famous like-named forebear.

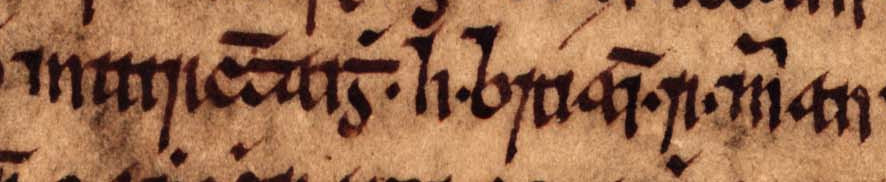
The name and title of Muirchertach Ua Briain as it appears on folio 19r of Oxford Bodleian Library Rawlinson B 488 (the Annals of Tigernach): "Muirchertaigh h-Úi Bríain, ríg Muman". Under Muirchertach, the Irish Uí Briain kindred sought to extend its influence into the Isles.

According to the twelfth-century Historia regum Anglorum, Alexander I, King of Scotland struggled to maintain control of his kingdom. One region which may have caused the Scots some concern was the Isles. In 1111, Domnall mac Taidc seized the kingship of the region, possibly with the aid of Muirchertach's northern opponent, Domnall Mac Lochlainn. This encroachment of competing Irish factions into the Isles may well have been as unpalatable to the English and Scots as the power vacuum left in the wake of Magnús' demise.

The exact date of his accession to the kingship of the Isles is uncertain. Although the chronicle claims that he began to reign in 1102, it also states that he reigned for forty years, and shows that he died in 1153. If this reign length is correct, his accession probably dates to about 1112, 1113, 1114, or 1115. (Note: The chronicle erroneously dates Óláfr's death to 1142/1143.) In any case, Óláfr's accession dates to about the time of Muirchertach's faltering authority in 1114. Domnall may have been driven out of the Isles by force, or he could have been drawn back to Ireland in an attempt to capitalise upon his uncle's failing health and fleeting authority.

Óláfr's return to the Isles from England appears to have been the work of Henry I, who would have likely welcomed a steadfast dependent in control a region of strategic importance. Although the English and Scottish kings were certainly at odds over Cumbria at about this time, it is likely that they would have cooperated to combat the extension of Uí Briain and Meic Lochlainn influence in the Isles. In fact, the Scottish king's participation in the 1114 English expedition against Gruffudd—a man who seems to have been an associate of Muirchertach—may have been undertaken in this context. (Note: Gruffudd was born in Dublin, and seems to have sought military assistance from Muirchertach during his career.) Furthermore, Muirchertach was closely associated with the Bellême-Montgomery family that had risen in a failed revolt against the English Crown in the first decade of the century. According to the twelfth-century Gesta regum Anglorum, the English imposed a trade embargo against Muirchertach at some point during the reign of Henry I. Whilst it is possible that this action was a consequence of Muirchertach's familial relationship with his son-in-law Arnulf de Montgomery—and Muirchertach's apparent part in the Bellême-Montgomery insurrection—another possibility is that the sanctions concerned Muirchertach's ambitions in the Irish Sea region, especially since Óláfr had been entrusted into Henry I's care. By establishing Óláfr in the Isles, Henry I may have sought to mitigate the extension of Irish influence in the Isles, and escalate the expansion of English authority into the Irish Sea region.

== Alliances ==
Simplified pedigree depicting the degree of kinship between Óláfr, Henry I, Fergus, and Somairle.

Henry I (died 1135)
Hákon (died 1137)	Fergus (died 1161)	unknown
Páll (died 1137)	Ingibjǫrg	Óláfr (died 1153)	Affraic
Somairle (died 1164)	Ragnhildr	Guðrøðr (died 1187)

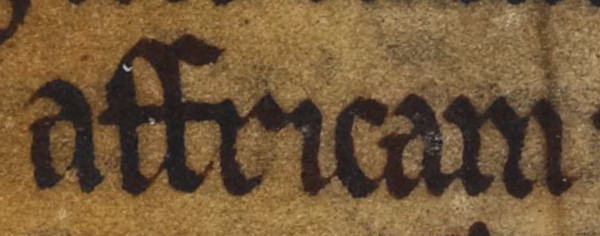
The name of Óláfr's wife, Affraic ingen Fergusa, as it appears on folio 35v of British Library Cotton Julius A VII: "Affricam".

According to the Chronicle of Mann, Óláfr married Affraic, daughter of Fergus, Lord of Galloway. Although the union is not dated by contemporary sources, it appears to have been arranged in the 1130s or 1140s. Affraic is specifically identified as the mother of Guðrøðr by the chronicle. The fact that he is recorded to have travelled to Norway on a diplomatic mission in 1152 suggests that he was an adult by this date, and may indicate that Óláfr and Affraic's union commenced in the 1130s. Several contemporary sources concerning Fergus' descendants suggest that he had married an illegitimate daughter of Henry I in about the 1120s, and that this woman was the mother of at least some of Fergus' offspring, including Affraic herself. (Note: The thirteenth-century Chronica of Roger de Hoveden describes Fergus' son, Uhtred, as a kinsman of Henry II, King of England. The date of the marriage between Fergus and Henry I's daughter can be estimated due to the fact that Uhtred witnessed a charter dating to about 1136: The fact that he appears as a witness suggests that he was at least fifteen years-old at the time.) In fact, the shared kinship between Guðrøðr and Henry I's succeeding grandson, Henry II, King of England, is noted by the twelfth-century Chronica of Robert de Torigni, Abbot of Mont Saint-Michel. (Note: Henry II's mother was Matilda, daughter of Henry I. Robert de Torigni's Chronica notes that Guðrøðr and Henry II were related by blood through Matilda, stating in Latin: "Est enim prædictus rex consanguineus regis Anglorum ex parte Matildis imperatricis matris suæ" ("For the aforesaid king is the cousin of the English king on the side of Matilda the empress, his mother").) The marital alliance forged between Óláfr and Fergus gave the Crovan dynasty valuable familial-connections with the English king, one of the most powerful rulers in western Europe. Fergus profited from the marriage pact as well, since it bound Galloway more tightly to the Isles, a neighbouring realm from which Galloway had been invaded during the time of Magnús' overlordship. (Note: In 1098, during Magnús' conquest of the Isles, the chronicle reports that Magnús used Mann as a base from where he subdued the Gallovidians. The chronicle specifies that Magnús forced the Gallovidians to render a tribute of timber, which he then used to construct fortresses on Mann.) The union also ensured Fergus the protection of one of Britain's most formidable fleets, and gave him a valuable ally then outside the orbit of the Scottish king.

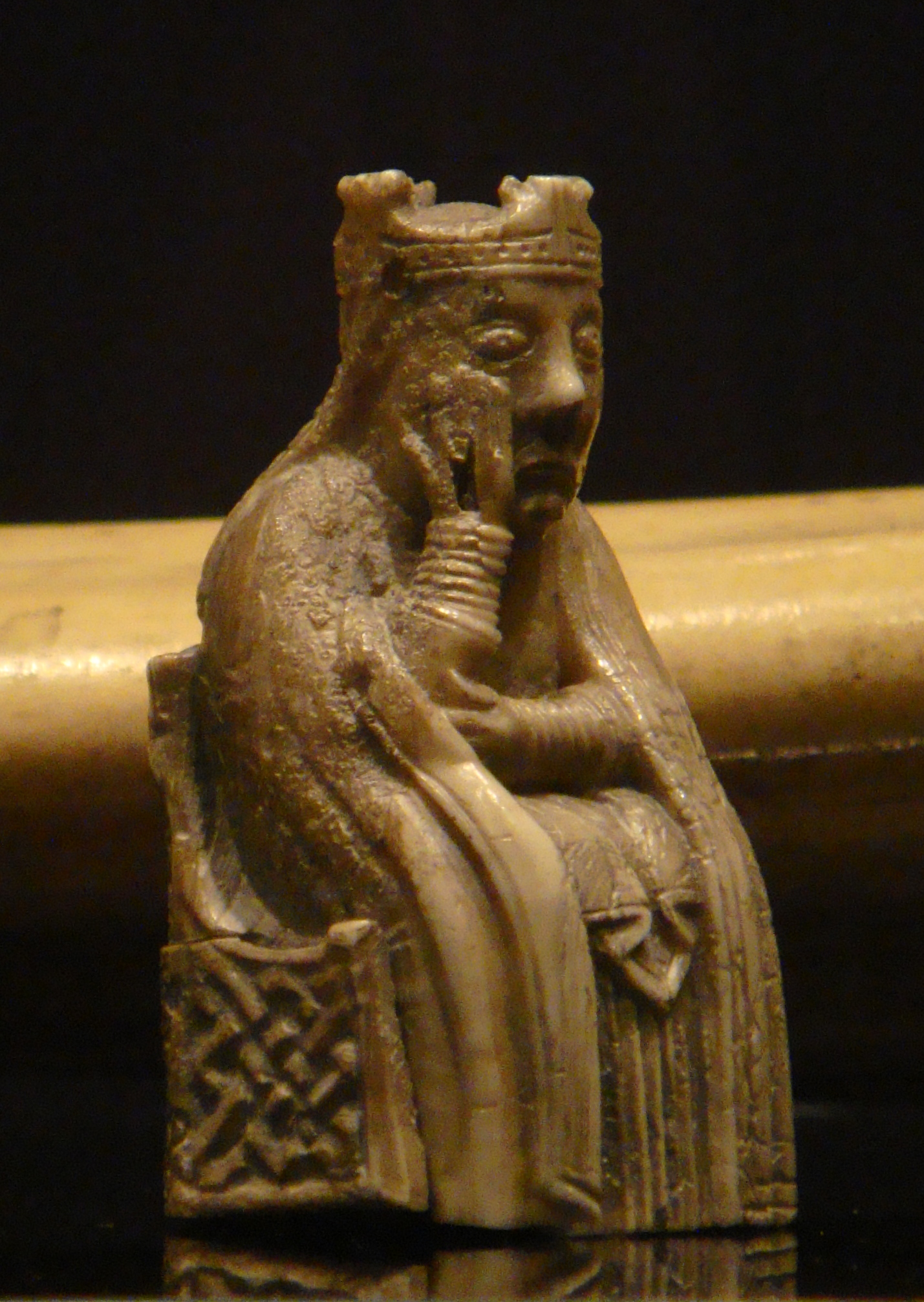
A queen gaming piece of the so-called Lewis chessmen. Almost nothing is known of queenship in the Isles.

Óláfr's dealings with Furness Abbey—a religious house founded by the Lord of Lancaster, Stephen of Blois—could be evidence that Óláfr and Stephen enjoyed amiable relations in the first third of the twelfth century, and may indicate that Óláfr supported Stephen as King of England after 1135. At about this time, David I appears to have consolidated his overlordship of Argyll, a region located on the western periphery of the Scottish realm. By about 1140, not only had Óláfr and Fergus bound themselves together, but Somairle mac Gilla Brigte, Lord of Argyll married one of Óláfr's illegitimate daughters. Although the name of this woman is not recorded by the Chronicle of Mann, she is identified as Ragnhildr by the thirteenth-century Orkneyinga saga. The marital binding of Óláfr with two of David I's dependants—Fergus and Somairle—roughly coincided with the Scottish king's endeavour to establish control of Cumbria in the 1130s and 1140s. During this period, David's authority extended southwards along the Cumbrian coast through Copeland, Furness, into Stephen's former honour of Lancaster, thereby making him a principal power in the northern Irish Sea region. The martial alliances concerning Óláfr, therefore, may have formed part of a Scottish strategy to not only isolate him from an English alliance, but to project Scottish authority into the Irish Sea, and draw Óláfr into David I's sphere of influence.

The name of Óláfr's father-in-law, Hákon Pálsson, as it appears on folio 37r of AM 47 fol: "Hakon s(on) Pals j(arls)".

Besides his wife Affraic, the chronicle states that Óláfr had many concubines by whom he had several daughters—including the daughter married to Somairle—and three sons: Rǫgnvaldr, Lǫgmaðr, and Haraldr. (Note: In another passage, the chronicle states that Óláfr "over indulged in the domestic vice of kings", which likely refers to the concubines associated with Óláfr in the same source.) The B-text of the thirteenth-century Fagrskinna records that Óláfr married Ingibjǫrg, daughter of Hákon Pálsson, Earl of Orkney. Whilst Ingibjǫrg is not referred to by the chronicle, she is certainly linked to Óláfr by Orkneyinga saga, although this source also incorrectly states—in a passage concerning Guðrøðr's son and successor, Rǫgnvaldr—that Ingibjǫrg was Guðrøðr's mother. As a consequence of this error, there is reason to suspect that the saga has conflated Guðrøðr's son with Somairle's like-named son, Ragnall. The saga's confused entry, therefore, may be evidence that Ingibjǫrg was the mother of Óláfr's daughter, Ragnhildr. The terminology employed by the sources documenting Affraic and Ingibjǫrg reveal that the latter's relationship with Óláfr came to be viewed differently in Orkney than the Isles. Although Orkneyinga saga acknowledges that the union between Ingibjǫrg's own parents was not a canonical marriage either, the coupling formed the basis for her family's claim to the earldom. (Note: During the twelfth century, the Church sought to emphasise the sanctity of marriage, and took steps to combat concubinage. In the winter of 1176/1177, the chronicle reveals that Guðrøðr's marriage to Findguala Nic Lochlainn was formalised by a visiting papal legate. This episode could be evidence that the papal representative sought to personally reinforce a stricter rule of marriage in the region on this occasion.) Whatever the case, Óláfr's union with Ingibjǫrg likely predates his marriage to Affraic. Accordingly, Óláfr appears to have turned from an alliance with Ingibjǫrg's brother and Norwegian dependant, Páll Hákonarson, Earl of Orkney, to establish an alliance with Fergus, who was then a rising power in the Irish Sea region. The result of this shift may be alluded to by the chronicle which states that Óláfr held peaceful alliances with Irish and Scottish kings so that none "dared disturbed" the Kingdom of the Isles.

== Ecclesiastical foundations and appointments ==
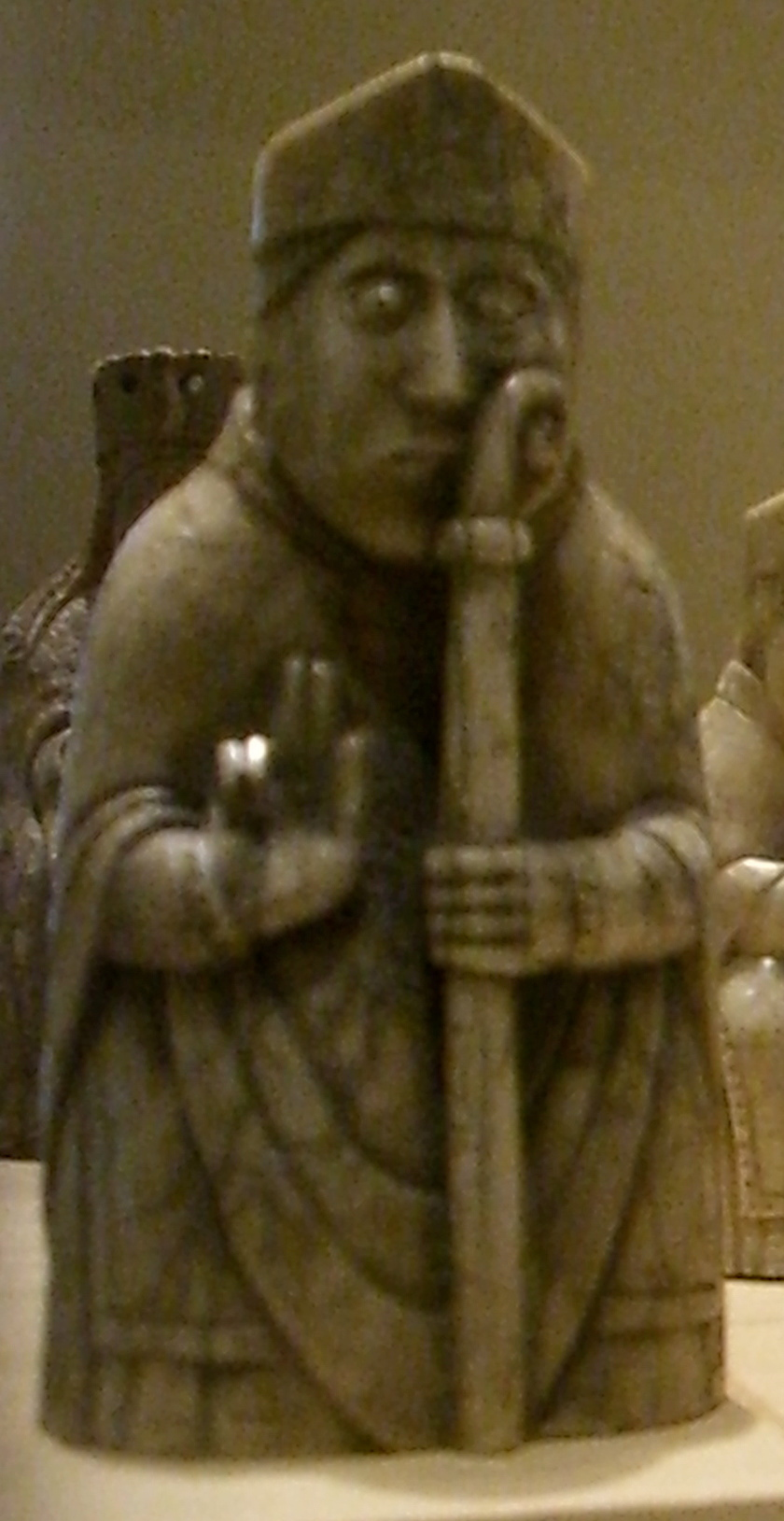
A bishop gaming piece, one of the so-called Lewis chessmen. (Note: The so-called chessmen consist of gaming pieces from at least four different sets. They were likely crafted in Norway in the twelfth- and thirteenth centuries, and were found in the early nineteenth century in Lewis. Although the hoard itself appears to have been deposited on the island sometime in the early thirteenth century, some of the pieces may have originally arrived in the Isles as a result of Guðrøðr's journey to Norway in 1152, possibly in the form of a gift between kings, or as a gift from the Archbishop of Niðaróss to the Bishop of the Isles. The pictured piece depicts a seated bishop, holding a crozier with two hands, and wearing a chasuble as an outer garment. The simple horned mitre worn by this particular piece may be evidence that it dates to the mid twelfth century, when horns began to be positioned on the front and back, as opposed to the sides of the headdress.)

Whilst at the English royal court, Óláfr could well have met members of the Scottish monarchy. For example, Henry I's wife was Matilda, whose royal brothers, Alexander I and the future David I, King of Scotland, both resided in England before the onset of their reigns (the brothers respectively reigned in 1102–1124 and 1124–1153). Óláfr would have certainly been exposed to Henry I's efforts to reform the English Church. Both Matilda and her husband were renowned patrons of religious orders, the Augustinians in particular. Although Óláfr's stay at Henry's court predated the arrival of the Savignac and Cistercian orders in England, Óláfr's experiences in England clearly influenced his decision to introduce reformed monastic orders into his own realm. In fact, the ecclesiastical actions of Óláfr's Scottish contemporaries—David I, and his predecessing Alexander I—were similarly influenced by their time spent in England. Óláfr's interest in religious reform is alluded to by the Chronicle of Mann, which declares: "he was devout and enthusiastic in matters of religion and was welcome both to God and men".

The ecclesiastical jurisdiction within Óláfr's kingdom was the Diocese of the Isles. Little is known of its early history, although its origins may well lie with the Uí Ímair imperium. (Note: The diocese is generally called Sodorensis in mediaeval sources. This Latin term is derived from the Old Norse Suðreyjar, and therefore means "of the Southern Isles", in reference to Mann and the Hebrides as opposed to the Northern Isles.) Ecclesiastical interconnection between the Isles and Dublin seems to have been severed during a period of Irish overlordship of Dublin, at about the beginning of Guðrøðr Crovan's reign in the Isles. By the time of Óláfr's reign, the diocese appears to have encompassed the islands that had formerly been claimed by Magnús, (Note: The diocese did not include the peninsula of Kintyre. According to saga-tradition, Magnús had his ship drawn across the peninsula's isthmus to demonstrate his right to the land.) and may well have included territory in western Galloway. In a letter that appears to date to about 1113, at about start of his reign, Óláfr presented an unnamed bishop for consecration to an Archbishop of York. Although the letter identifies the bishop with the initial "G", which potentially could represent Gerald, whose tenure dates to 1100–1108, the fact that Óláfr's reign appears to have commenced several years later suggests that the initial is erroneous, and that the initial "T" was intended, perhaps in reference to either archbishop Thomas, or the Thomas' successor, Thurstan. No consecration is recorded in English sources, and Óláfr's candidate is not recorded in the chronicle.

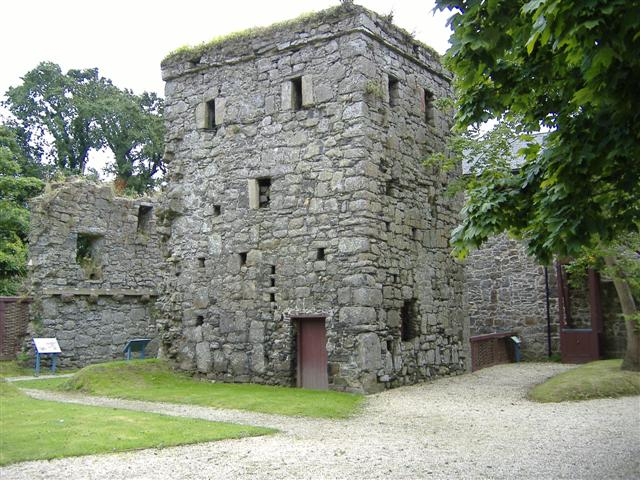
Ruinous Rushen Abbey, near Ballasalla. The actual abbey founded by Óláfr may have been located near Castletown, before removing to Ballasalla late in the twelfth century.

In about 1134, the chronicle reveals that Óláfr founded the Rushen Abbey on Mann by granting Ivo, Abbot of Furness land to establish the house. As a Savignac daughter house of nearby Furness Abbey—a religious house seated just across the Irish Sea in Lancashire—Rushen Abbey was the first reformed house in the Isles, (Note: The 1153 bull of Pope Eugenius III to Furness makes note of Óláfr's gift of Manx lands to the abbey: "ex dono nobilis viri Olavi regis insularum". Although the ruins of Rushen Abbey stand near Ballasalla today, there is evidence to suggest that the original site was located at Scarlett (near Castletown), until the abbey relocated to Douglas in 1192, and finally to its present location in about 1196. Until its dissolution in the sixteenth century, Rushen Abbey was the principal monastic establishment on Mann. The house may have turned Cistercian in about 1147.) and its foundation partly evidences the importance of links between Mann and northern England. (Note: The Crovan dynasty's continuing contacts with England appear to have stemmed from Óláfr's English exile.) During his tenure as archbishop (1114–1140), Thurstan was a proponent of ecclesiastical reform in northern England, and there is reason to suspect that he played an active role in Óláfr's foundation. Not only did it continue Thurstan's programme of monastic reform, but it further extended the ecclesiastical authority of the Archdiocese of York. In any case, the abbey's foundation charter reveals that Óláfr granted the monks of Furness the right to elect the Bishop of the Isles, a provision that not only emphasised Óláfr's royal prerogative, but allowed Furness to funnel continental influences into the Isles. The charter implies that episcopal authority within his realm had fallen to outsiders, and expresses the king's desire that the Isles be administered by its own bishop. This could be evidence that the former diocesan bishop, Hamond, died several years previous, and that a period of vacancy ensued in which neighbouring bishops took up the slack. The reestablishment of the Diocese of Whithorn in 1128, may have been undertaken in this context, and may also signal the loss of western Galloway from the Kingdom of the Isles.

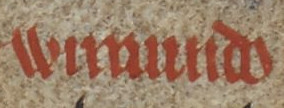
The name of Wimund as it appears on folio 122v of British Library Cotton Vespasian B VI (Historia rerum Anglicarum).

In a letter that probably dates not long after his foundation, Óláfr wrote to Thurstan, and confirmed the candidate elected by the monks of Furness. Hamond's successor appears to have been the shadowy Wimund, Bishop of the Isles. According to the twelfth-century Historia rerum Anglicarum, Wimund began his ecclesiastical career at Furness before removing to Rushen. Although a twelfth-century chronicle of the ecclesiastical history of York states that Wimund professed obedience to Thomas, this archbishop's early tenure (1109–1114) suggests he has been confused with Thurstan. The fact that this source identifies Wimund's see as sancta ecclesia de Schith ("the holy Church of Skye") seems to be evidence that the diocesan seat had not yet been permanently centred on Mann, and that Wimund was seated at the site of the later mediaeval Snizort Cathedral. As a monk of Furness, Wimund may have originally relocated to Mann in the context of Óláfr's foundation of Rushen. He appears to have been the first Bishop of the Isles elected by the monks of Furness, and seems to have been consecrated by Thurstan. Wimund appears to have used his elevated position to violently seek the inheritance of an Earl of Moray in the late 1140s. Wimund's warring against the Scots eventually forced David I to cede him lands near Furness before his capture and mutilation in 1152. It is likely that Wimund's campaigning led to the abandonment of his diocesan see, and that his actions posed a serious threat to Óláfr's authority.

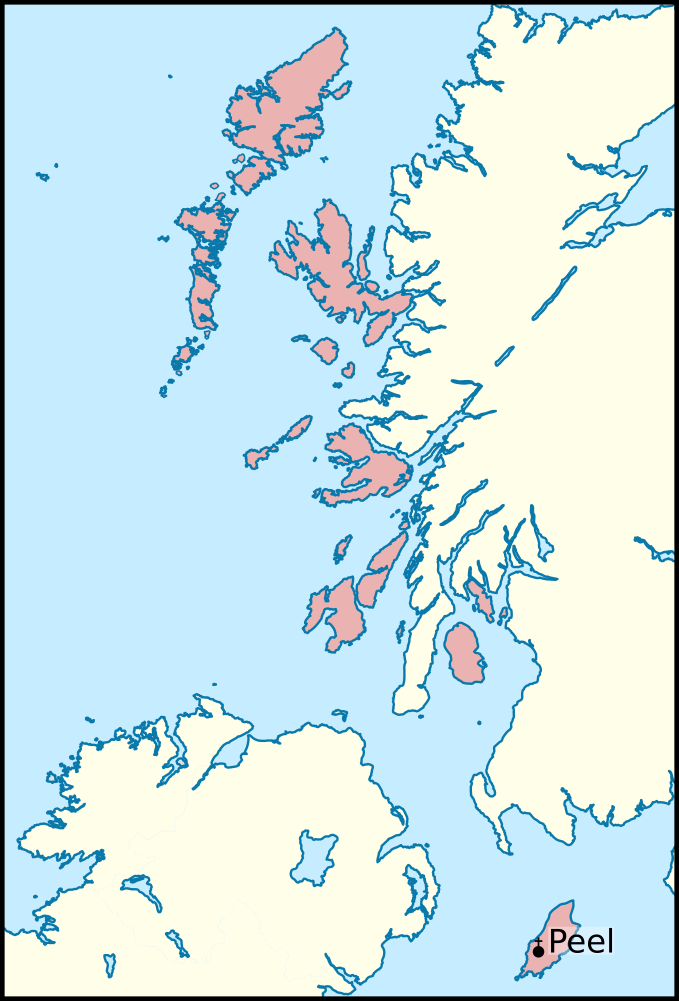
Extent of the Diocese of the Isles, c.1300.

The fact that Wimund is not listed amongst other diocesan bishops by the Chronicle of Mann could be evidence that Óláfr eventually came to repudiate him. A letter from Óláfr to the chapter of York suggests that the king unsuccessfully attempted to have a replacement, a certain Nicholas, consecrated by Robert de Ghent, Dean of York. The fact that Óláfr interacted with the dean suggests that the correspondence dates between the 1147 deposition of William fitz Herbert, Archbishop of York and the 1152 consecration of Henry Murdac, Archbishop of York. Óláfr's inability to have his man consecrated may have been due to the Wimund episode being unresolved at the time. According to Robert de Torigni's Chronica and the thirteenth-century Wendover version Flores historiarum, Henry Murdac consecrated John, a Benedictine monk from Normandy, as Bishop of the Isles in 1152. The fact that the Chronicle of Mann fails to record John's name amongst other diocesan bishops appears to indicate that he was an unacceptable candidate to Óláfr and the Islesmen, and that John never occupied his see.

== Ecclesiastical and secular independence ==
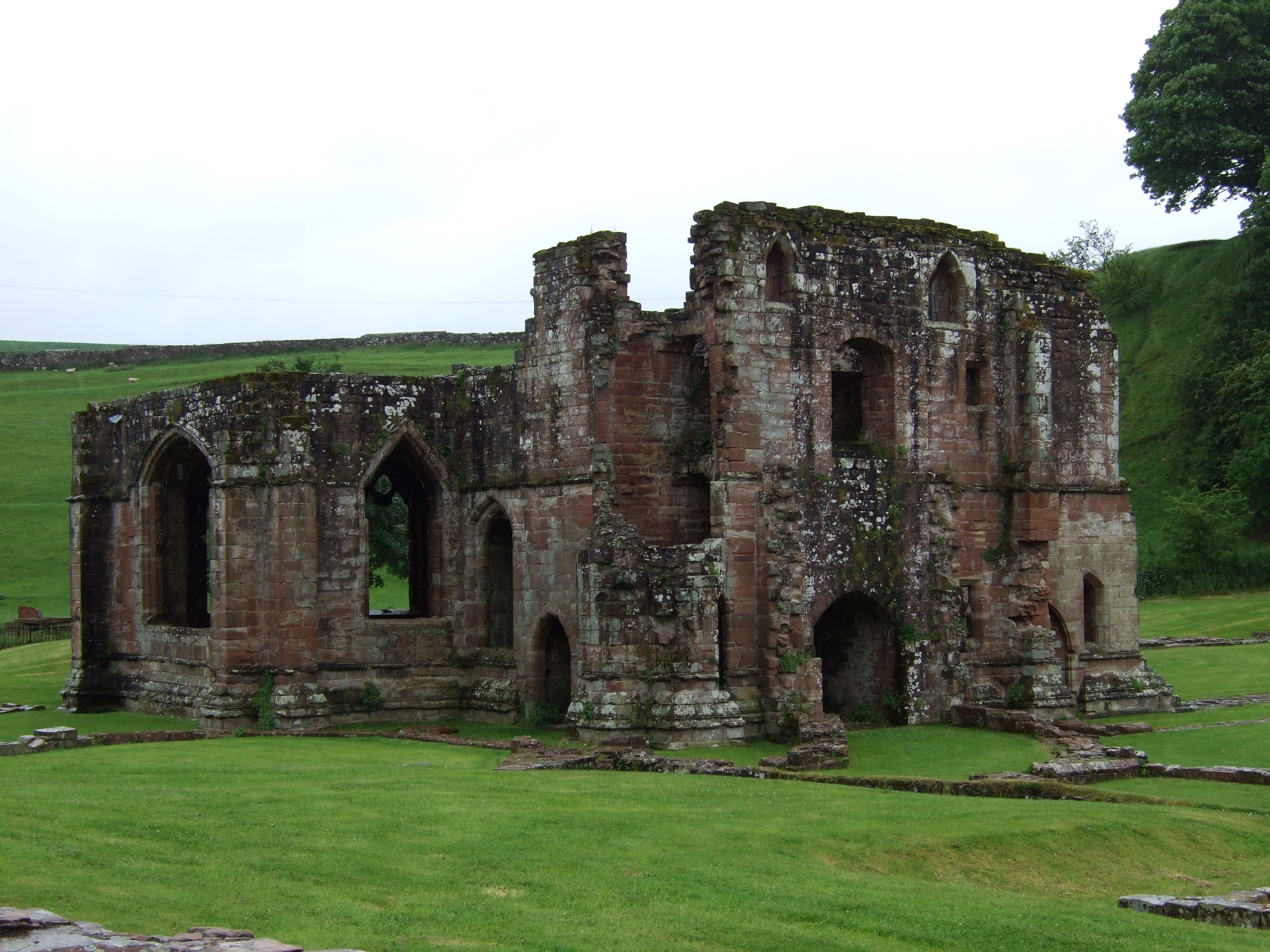
Ruinous Furness Abbey. Óláfr forged close connections with the monks of this Lancashire religious house, and granted them the right to elect his Bishop of the Isles.

By way of his ecclesiastical actions, Óláfr firmly established the Diocese of the Isles to correspond to the territorial borders of his kingdom, and seems to have initiated the transfer the ecclesiastical obedience of the Isles from the Archdiocese of Canterbury to the Archdiocese of York. Such changes may have been orchestrated as a means to further distance his diocese from that of Dublin, where diocesan bishops were consecrated by the Archbishop of Canterbury. In 1152, steps were undertaken by the papacy to elevate the Diocese of Dublin to an archdiocese. Dublin's political and economic ties with the Isles could have meant that the Bishop of the Isles was now in danger of becoming subordinate to the Archbishop of Dublin. For Óláfr, such an event would have threatened to undermine both his ecclesiastical authority and secular power within his own realm. As a result of Óláfr's inability to have Nicholas formally consecrated, and his refusal to accept John as bishop, the episcopal see of the Isles appears to have been vacant at the same time of Dublin's ecclesiastical ascendancy. In consequence, without a consecrated bishop of its own, Óláfr's diocese seems to have been in jeopardy of falling under Dublin's increasing authority. Moreover, in 1152, David I attempted to have the dioceses of Orkney and the Isles included within the prospective Scottish Archdiocese of St Andrews.

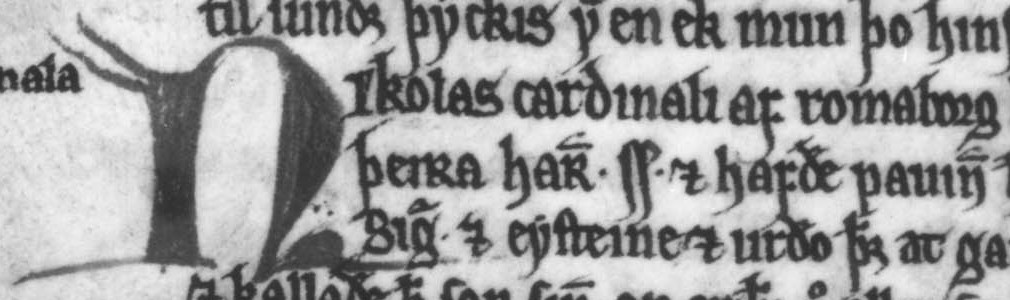
The name and title of Nicholas Breakspeare as they appear on folio 57v of AM 47 fol: "Nikolas cardinali af Romaborg".

It may have been in the context of this ecclesiastical crisis in the Isles that Guðrøðr undertook his journey to Norway in 1152. Guðrøðr's overseas objective, therefore, may have been to secure the patronage of a Scandinavian metropolitan willing to protect the Diocese of the Isles. Certainly, Guðrøðr's stay in Norway coincided with the Scandinavian visit of the papal legate Nicholas Breakspeare, Cardinal-Bishop of Albano, a man who had been tasked to create Norwegian and Swedish ecclesiastical provinces in order to further extend the papacy's authority into the northern European periphery. Eventually the newly created Norwegian province—the Archdiocese of Niðaróss—encompassed eleven dioceses inside and outside mainland Norway. One such overseas diocese was that of the Isles, officially incorporated within the province in November 1154. (Note: Today Niðaróss is known as Trondheim. Of the eleven dioceses, five were centred in Norway and six in colonies overseas (two in Iceland, one in Orkney, one in the Faroe Islands, one in Greenland, and one in the Isles).) Although Óláfr did not live long enough to witness the latter formality, it is evident that the remarkable overseas statecraft undertaken by Óláfr and Guðrøðr secured their kingdom's ecclesiastical and secular independence from nearby Dublin. The establishment of the Norwegian archdiocese bound outlying Norse territories closer to Norwegian royal power. In effect, the political reality of the Diocese of the Isles—its territorial borders and nominal subjection to far-off Norway—appears to have mirrored that of the Kingdom of the Isles.

== Kingship ==
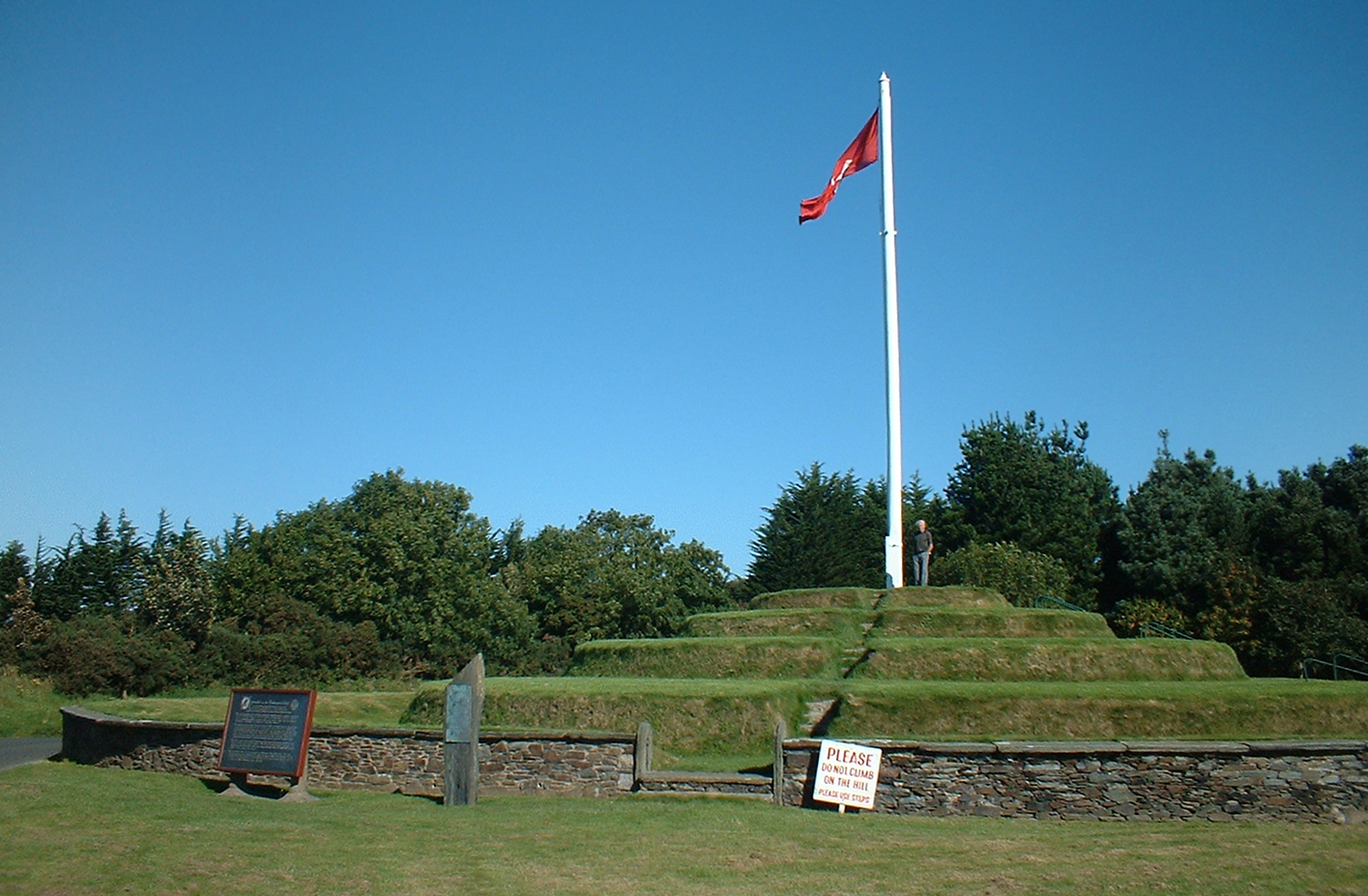
Tynwald Hill, near St John's may have been a national assembly site of the Kingdom of the Isles. It may well have been the place where the Islesmen publicly inaugurated their kings, proclaimed new laws, and resolved disputes. Nevertheless, much of the visible site dates only to the eighteenth-, nineteenth-, and twentieth century. (Note: Evidence of local assembly sites within the kingdom may exist in the Hebridean placenames Tiongal (known in Scottish Gaelic as Cnoc an Tiongalairidh) in Lewis (grid reference NB1937), and Tinwhil (perhaps grid reference NG415583) within the Hinnisdale area on Skye. Like the Manx site, these four Hebridean placenames are derived in part from the Old Norse þing ("assembly"). Sites such as these, and others now lost, may have been established before the dominance of Manx-based kings and their national assembly site.)

In some respects, Óláfr's kingship may be comparable to that of David I, a significant moderniser of the Scottish realm. Due to his time spent in England, Óláfr seems to have introduced modern forms of feudalism into his realm, and to have developed manorialism on Mann. Óláfr seems to have introduced the parochial system into the Isles; and like David I, Óláfr transformed the church within his realm, creating a territorially defined diocese. His establishment of a more modern territorial kingship, which came to be associated with its demesne on Mann, may have led to the alienation of outlying areas. Although climatic conditions in the Isles improved in the eleventh century, and agricultural production appears to have increased as a result, there appears to have been a decrease in manufacturing by the twelfth century. Evidence of an eleventh-century mint on Mann exists prior to Guðrøðr Crovan's rule, but there is no evidence of one during Óláfr's reign, and no coins bearing the names of any of the members of his dynasty have been found. (Note: There appears to have been no Manx coinage between the late eleventh and early fourteenth centuries.)

The acclamation or election of a king was an important component of kingship in northern mediaeval Europe. There are several examples of the role played by chieftains in the kingship of the Isles during Óláfr's floruit. For instance, the leading men of the realm are recorded to have brokered the deal to have Muirchertach provide a regent until Óláfr was old enough to reign, whilst disaffected chieftains are reported to have brought about the dramatic end of Ingimundr's regency, and chieftains are said to have accompanied Óláfr from England to begin his reign. Even in the immediate aftermath of Óláfr's demise, the Chronicle of Mann reveals that the chieftains of the Isles (principes insularum) gathered together and unanimously elected Guðrøðr as king.

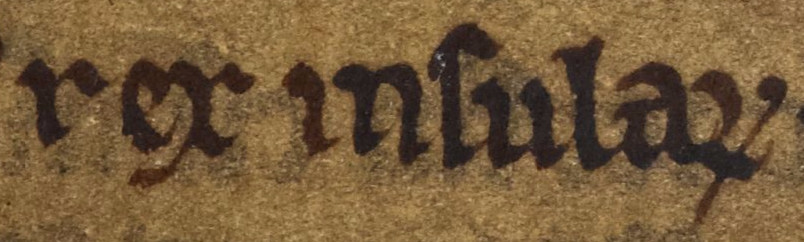
The title of Óláfr's son and successor, Guðrøðr, as it appears on folio 40r British Library Cotton Julius A VII: "rex insularum" ("King of the Isles").

There is surviving evidence of only twenty royal charters dating from the reign of the Crovan dynasty. Of these, only one dates to the reign of Óláfr. (Note: The evidence exists in originals, copies, and abstract versions of royal charters. The lone original charter dates to the reign of Óláfr's great-grandson, Magnús Óláfsson, King of Mann and the Isles.) Óláfr styled himself rex insularum, a Latin equivalent of a Gaelic title first accorded to his 10th century predecessor, Guðrøðr Haraldsson, King of the Isles. Surviving sources indicate that Óláfr was the first of several kings from his dynasty to claim to rule dei gratia ("by the grace of God"). The use of this formula was common amongst contemporary European monarchs but its use by the kings of the Isles, like the kings of Scotland, appears to have been adopted in imitation of the charters issued by the Angevin kings of England. Like the Scots, Óláfr and his successors appear to have adopted the formula to emphasise their sovereign right to kingship, to take their place amongst the leading monarchs of their time. Óláfr's use of the formula exemplifies the fact that—in comparison to his royal predecessors in the Isles—he was a new kind of ruler and the real founder of later Manx kingship. The fact that Óláfr was brought up at the English royal court could suggest that he, like David I, was knighted by the English king. Certainly, several of Óláfr's thirteenth-century royal successors were knighted by their English counterpart.

The name of Óláfr's daughter, Ragnhildr, as it appears on folio 143r of GKS 1005 fol (Flateyarbók): "Ragnhilldi". Ragnhildr married Somairle mac Gilla Brigte.

Óláfr appears to have been an energetic king who consolidated his rule in the northern portion of the Isles by way of military force. There is reason to suspect that this region had fallen under Orcadian influence before being reclaimed by the Islesmen under Óláfr. According to Hebridean tradition preserved by the seventeenth-century Sleat History, he was aided by Somairle in military operations (otherwise unrecorded in contemporary sources) against the "ancient Danes north of Ardnamurchan". (Note: In the eighteenth-century Book of Clanranald, the term "Dane" loosely refers to a Scandinavian.) Together with its claim that Óláfr also campaigned on North Uist, this source may be evidence that the bitter struggle between Guðrøðr and Somairle (fought after Óláfr's demise) took place in the context of Somairle taking back territories that he had originally helped secure into Óláfr's kingdom. Somairle first emerges into the historical record in the 1130s supporting an unsuccessful rival branch of the Scottish royal family against David I. By about the time of Somairle's marriage to Óláfr's daughter, David I seems to have successfully imposed his authority over Argyll. As a result of this apparent overlordship, Somairle may have been encouraged to redirect his energies from Scotland into the Isles.

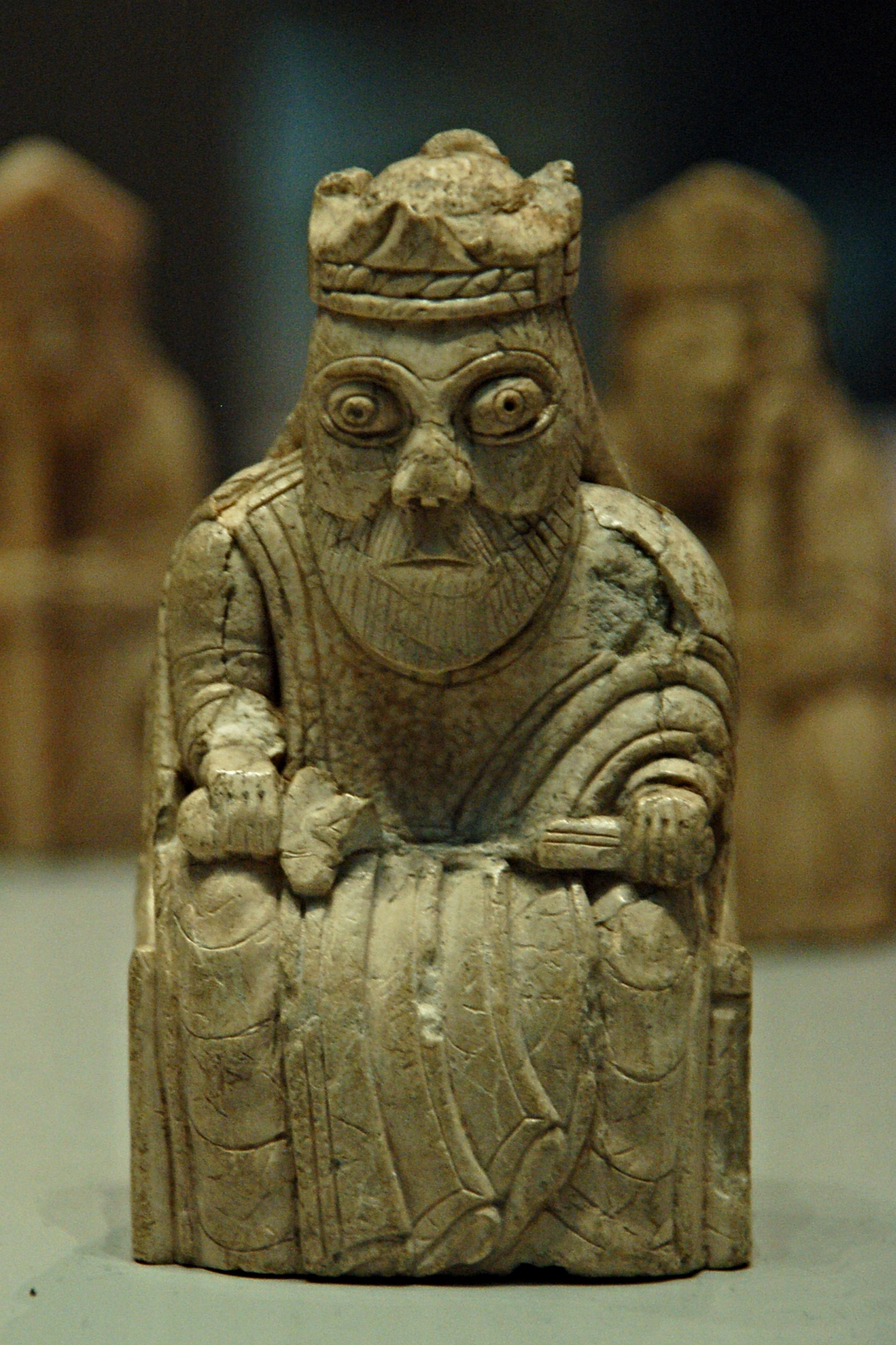
One of the king gaming pieces of the so-called Lewis chessmen.

There is reason to suspect that the Kingdom of the Isles lost control of territories in Galloway during Óláfr's floruit. Earlier in the mid eleventh century, the Rhinns of Galloway may have been ruled by Guðrøðr Crovan's predecessor, Echmarcach. By the last years of the century, the region was ruled by Mac Congail, King of the Rhinns, who may have been a descendant of Guðrøðr Crovan's immediate predecessor, Fingal mac Gofraid. Whether Mac Congail ruled independently or subordinate to Guðrøðr Crovan is unknown. The installation of Gilla Aldan as Bishop of Whithorn, in the third decade of the twelfth century, may mark the date when the Rhinns finally separated from the Kingdom of the Isles. Although support from the rulers of Galloway and Scotland may well have strengthened Óláfr's position in the Isles, and the chronicle portrays his reign as one of peacefulness, other sources vaguely recount the mainland depredations wrought by Wimund. The latter's warring against the Scots suggests that Óláfr may have struggled to maintain control of his far-flung kingdom. (Note: Historia rerum Anglicarum states that Wimund attacked and attempted exacted tribute from a certain bishop. One possibility is that this ecclesiast was Gilla Aldan himself, and that Wimund sought to extract a levy from Galloway that had recently terminated on account of Gilla Aldan's elevation.)

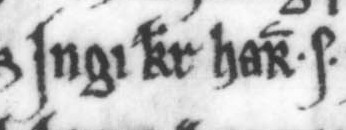
The name and title of Ingi Haraldsson as they appear on folio 57v of AM 47 fol: "Ingi konvngr Haʀalldz s(on)".

It is uncertain how the Diocese of the Isles was organised during Óláfr's reign. There may well have been several regional centres where diocesan bishops, accompanied by retinues of clerics and warriors, would have visited each successive region, living off the rendered tithes. In time however, the ecclesiastical endowments on Mann, commenced by Óláfr and further developed by his successors, would have reduced the need for such peripatetic diocesan bishops. As the kings of the Isles became more identified with their seat on Mann, so too were the bishops of the Isles, which may have resulted in the alienation of outlying areas.

The now-ruinous ecclesiastical site of Cille Donnain, near Loch Kildonan on South Uist, could well have been a bishop's seat and twelfth-century power-centre in the Isles. Its precise place in the organisation of the Isles is uncertain. Certainly, Lǫgmaðr is associated with the Uists by a particular verse of poetry, attributed to the contemporary skald Gísl Illugason, preserved by the early thirteenth-century Morkinskinna. This contemporary composition could be evidence of a connection between him, or an associated bishop, with the Uist chain of islands. It is possible that, at a later date, the Cille Donnain site could have formed a residence for the peripatetic diocesan bishops of the Isles during their periodic visitations in the Uists.

== Death ==
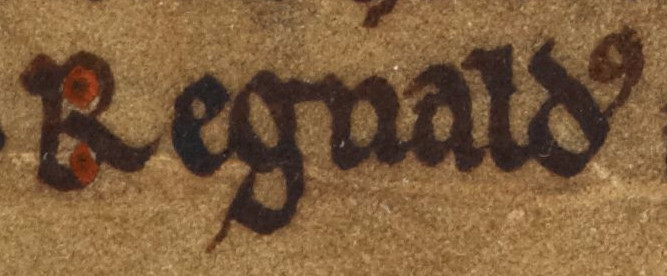
The name of Rǫgnvaldr Haraldsson, Óláfr's kin-slaying assassin, as it appears on folio 36r of British Library Cotton Julius A VII: "Regnaldus".

The year 1153 was a watershed in the history of the Kingdom of the Isles. Not only did David I die late in May, but Óláfr himself was assassinated about a month later on 29 June, whilst Guðrøðr was still absent in Norway. According to the Chronicle of Mann, Óláfr had been confronted by three Dublin-based nephews—the Haraldssonar—the sons of his exiled brother, Haraldr. After hearing the demands of these men—that half of the kingdom should be handed over to them—a formal council was convened in which one of the Haraldssonar—a man named Rǫgnvaldr—approached Óláfr, raised his axe as if to salute the king, and decapitated him in a single stroke. In the resulting aftermath, the chronicle relates that the Haraldssonar partitioned the island amongst themselves. (Note: If the chronicle's chronology of Haraldr's mutilation is correct, it would mean that the Haraldssonar were at least in their fifties when they confronted their uncle, a man who must have been at least in his late fifties.) Whether the men attained any form of authority in the rest of the Isles is unknown. Once in control of Mann, the chronicle reveals that the men fortified themselves against forces loyal to Guðrøðr, the kingdom's legitimate heir, by launching a preemptive strike against his maternal grandfather, Fergus. Although the invasion of Galloway was repulsed with heavy casualties, once the Haraldssonar returned to Mann the chronicle records that they slaughtered and expelled all resident Gallovidians that they could find. This ruthless reaction evidently reveals an attempt to uproot local factions adhering to Guðrøðr and his mother.

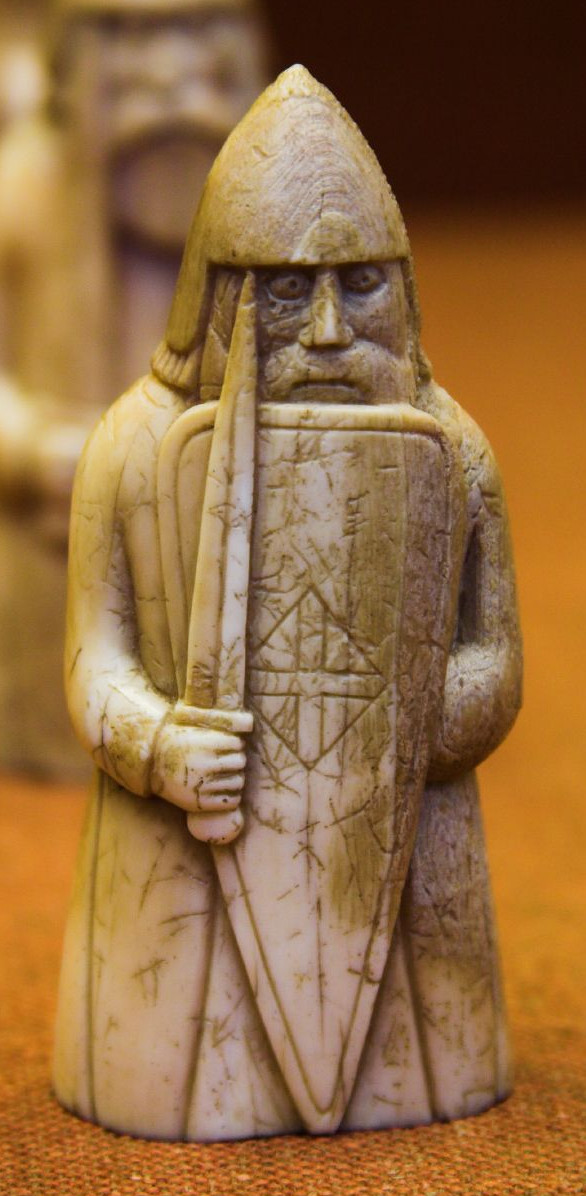
A rook gaming piece of the so-called Lewis chessmen. The Scandinavian connections of leading members of the Isles may have been reflected in their military armament, and could have resembled that depicted upon such gaming pieces.

Within months of his father's assassination, Guðrøðr executed his vengeance. According to the chronicle, he journeyed from Norway to Orkney, enstrengthened by Norwegian military support, and was unanimously acclaimed as king by the leading Islesmen. He is then stated to have continued on to Mann where he overcame his three kin-slaying cousins, putting one to death whilst blinding the other two, and successfully secured the kingship for himself. Guðrøðr's reliance upon Norwegian assistance, instead of support from his maternal-grandfather, could suggest that the attack upon Galloway was more successful than the compiler of the chronicle cared to admit. Additionally, the account of incessant inter-dynastic strife amongst the ruling family of Galloway, recorded in the twelfth-century Vita Ailredi, suggests that Fergus may have struggled to maintain control of his lordship by the mid 1150s, and may also explain his failure to come to Guðrøðr's aid following Óláfr's death.

The fact that Óláfr sent Guðrøðr to Norway in 1152 could suggest there had been anxiety over the succession of the Kingdom of the Isles, and that Guðrøðr rendered homage to Ingi Haraldsson, King of Norway in an effort secure assistance in safeguarding the kingship. The chronicle's account of Guðrøðr's return from Norway notes that he arrived with a fleet of five ships, which could indicate that overseas support was indeed obtained. The earlier episode of conflict between Óláfr's elder brothers, his own slaying at the hands of his nephews, and the later internecine struggles endured by his descendants, reveal that competition for the kingship of the Isles was incredibly competitive and exceptionally violent. The turn to Ingi occurred at about the same time that Norwegian encroachment superseded roughly thirty years of Scottish influence in Orkney and Caithness, and could be evidence of a perceived wane in Scottish royal authority in the first years of the 1150s. In November 1153, following the death of David I, Somairle seized the initiative and rose in revolt against the recently inaugurated Malcolm IV, King of Scotland. The dynastic challenges faced by Malcolm, and the ebb of Scottish influence in the Isles, may partly account for Guðrøðr's success in consolidating control of the kingdom, and may be perceptible in the seemingly more aggressive policy he pursued as king in comparison to his father.

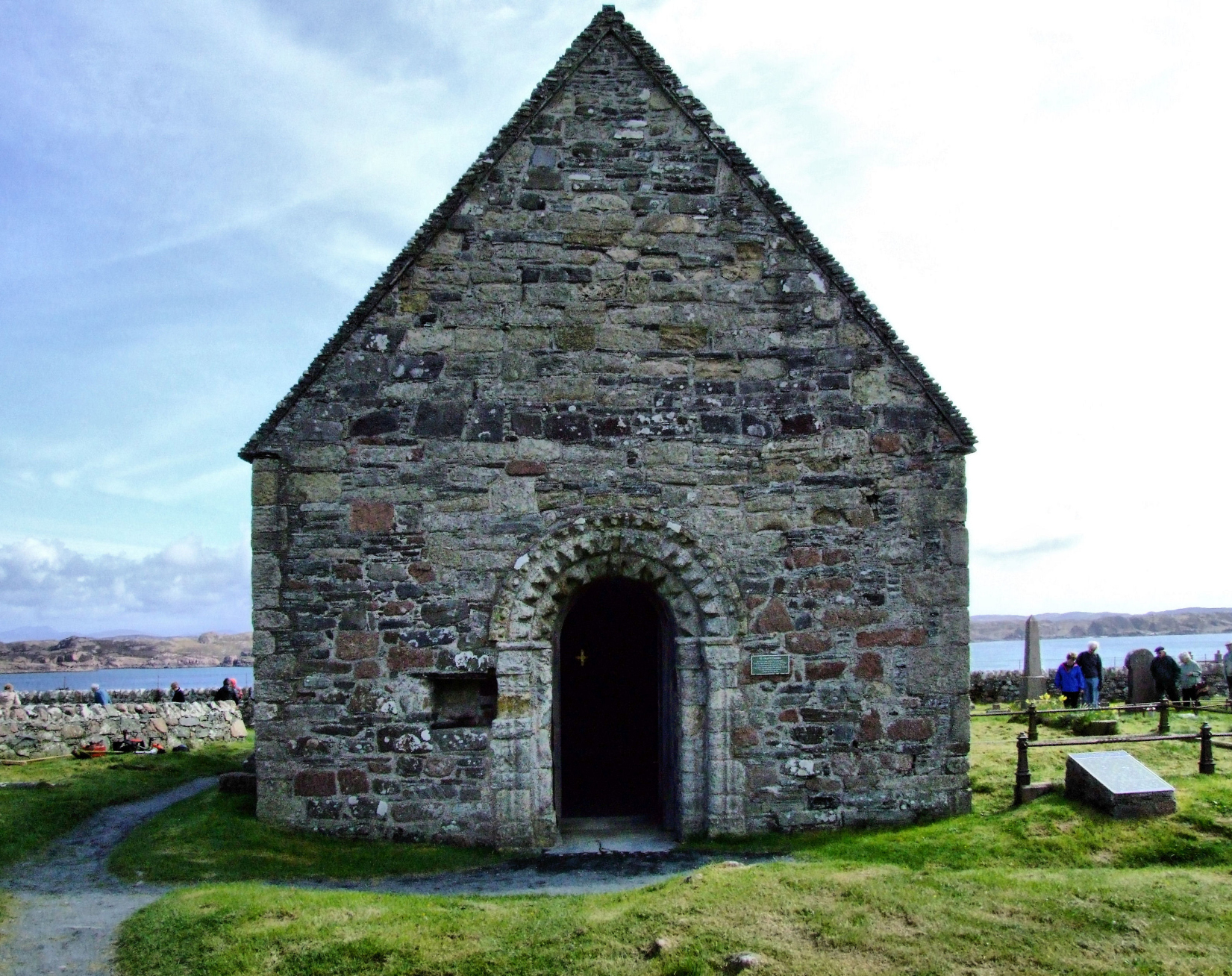
St Oran's Chapel, the oldest intact building on Iona, may have been built by Óláfr, his family, Somairle mac Gilla Brigte, or the latter's family.

Through Guðrøðr, Óláfr was the patrilineal-ancestor of later rulers of the Crovan dynasty, a kindred whose tenure of power in the Isles lasted until the second half of the thirteenth century. Through Ragnhildr, Óláfr was an important ancestor of the rulers of Clann Somairle, the descendants of Ragnhildr's husband Somairle. Whilst the union certainly testifies to Somairle's esteemed status, the key to his successful career may well have been the marriage itself. In fact, the early rulers of Clann Somairle appear to have owed their claim to the kingship of the Isles by right of their genealogical link to Óláfr through Ragnhildr.

Although the burial place of Óláfr is unrecorded and unknown, by the second quarter of the thirteenth century Rushen Abbey appears to have filled the role of royal mausoleum for the Crovan dynasty. Guðrøðr was himself buried on Iona, an island upon which the oldest intact building is St Oran's Chapel. Certain Irish influences in this building's architecture indicate that it dates to about the mid twelfth century. The chapel could well have been erected by Óláfr or Guðrøðr. (Note: Other potential candidates include Somairle and Ragnall.) Certainly, their family's remarkable ecclesiastical activities during this period suggest that patronage of Iona is probable.

== Citations ==
Óláfr Guðrøðarson Crovan dynasty Died: 29 June 1153
Regnal titles
Preceded by Domnall mac Taidc	King of the Isles; 1112/1115–1153	Succeeded by Guðrøðr Óláfsson
