= Ruaidhrí mac Raghnaill =

Norse-Gaelic leader

- Lord of Kintyre
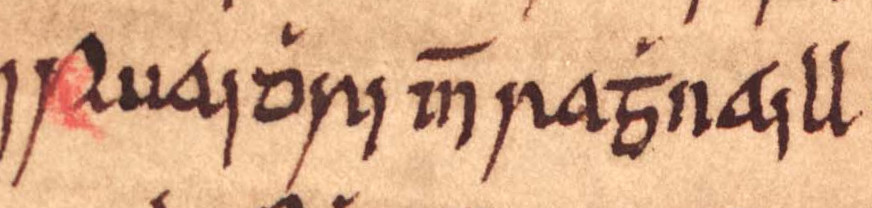
- Ruaidhrí's name as it appears on folio 63r of Oxford Bodleian Library Rawlinson B 489 (the Annals of Ulster).
- Died: 1247?
- Noble family: Clann Somhairle
- Issue: Dubhghall, Ailéan, and possibly two daughters
- Father: Raghnall mac Somhairle

Ruaidhrí mac Raghnaill (died 1247?) was a leading figure in the Kingdom of the Isles and a member of Clann Somhairle. (Note: Since the 1980s, academics have accorded Ruaidhrí various personal names in English secondary sources: Roderick, Rodoricus, Rory, Ruadhri, Ruaidhri, Ruaidhrí, Ruaidrí, Ruaidri, Ruaídrí, Ruairi, Ruairí, Ruairidh, Ruari, and Ruaridh. Likewise, since the 2000s, academics have accorded Ruaidhrí various patronyms in English secondary sources: Ruaidhrí mac Raghnaill mhic Somhairle, Ruaidhrí mac Raghnaill, Ruaidhri mac Raghnall, Ruaidhrí mac Ragnaill, Ruaidhri mac Raonaill, Ruaidhrí mac Raonaill, Ruaidrí mac Ragnaill, Ruaidrí mac Raonaill, Ruairidh mac Raghnaill, Ruairidh mac Raonaill, Ruairidh mac Raonall, and Ruaridh mac Ranald.) He was a son of Raghnall mac Somhairle and was the eponymous ancestor of Clann Ruaidhrí. Ruaidhrí may have become the principal member of Clann Somhairle following the annihilation of Aonghus mac Somhairle in 1210. At about this time, Ruaidhrí seems to have overseen a marital alliance with the reigning representative of the Crovan dynasty, Rǫgnvaldr Guðrøðarson, King of the Isles, and to have contributed to a reunification of the Kingdom of the Isles between Clann Somhairle and the Crovan dynasty.

In the first third of thirteenth century, the Scottish Crown faced a series of uprisings from the Meic Uilleim, a discontented branch of the Scottish royal family. Ruaidhrí is recorded to have campaigned with Thomas fitz Roland, Earl of Atholl against the Irish in the second decade of the century. One possibility is that these maritime attacks were conducted in the context of suppressing Irish supporters of Scottish malcontents. In 1221/1222, Alexander II, King of Scotland oversaw a series of invasions into Argyll in which Scottish royal authority penetrated into Kintyre. As a result, Ruaidhrí appears to have been ejected from the peninsula and replaced by his younger brother, Domhnall. Whilst Alexander's campaign appears to have been directed at Ruaidhrí, the precise reasons behind it are uncertain. On one hand, the threat of a unified Kingdom of the Isles may have triggered the invasion. On the other hand, if Ruaidhrí had indeed supported the Meic Uilleim, such support to Alexander's rivals could account for royal retaliation directed at Ruaidhrí.

According to several mediaeval chronicles, a certain Roderick took part in the last Meic Uilleim revolt against Alexander. One possibility is that Ruaidhrí and this Roderick are identical. If correct, Ruaidhrí's alliance with the Meic Uilleim may have originated as a consequence of his expulsion from Kintyre by the Scottish Crown. Whilst Ruaidhrí's later descendants certainly held power in the Hebrides and Garmoran, it is uncertain how and when these territories passed into their possession. In 1230, following Scottish interference in the Isles, Hákon Hákonarson, King of Norway sent Óspakr-Hákon to restore authority in the region as King of the Isles. The fact that Ruaidhrí is not recorded in the subsequent Norwegian campaign could be evidence that he had occupied himself in supporting the near-concurrent Meic Uilleim rebellion, or that he resented the prospect of Óspakr-Hákon's overlordship.

Ruaidhrí seems to be identical to a certain Mac Somhairle who was slain in battle assisting Maol Seachlainn Ó Domhnaill, King of Tír Chonaill resist an English invasion. The following year, Ruaidhrí's son, Dubhghall, and another Clann Somhairle dynast sought the kingship of the Isles from Hákon. There is reason to suspect that Mac Somhairle had previously been recognised by Hákon as King of the Isles, and that the two Clann Somhairle kinsmen sought to succeed Mac Somhairle as king after his death. Whatever the case, Ruaidhrí's sons were certainly active in Ireland afterwards, with his younger son, Ailéan, being one of the earliest gallowglass commanders on record.

== Familial background ==
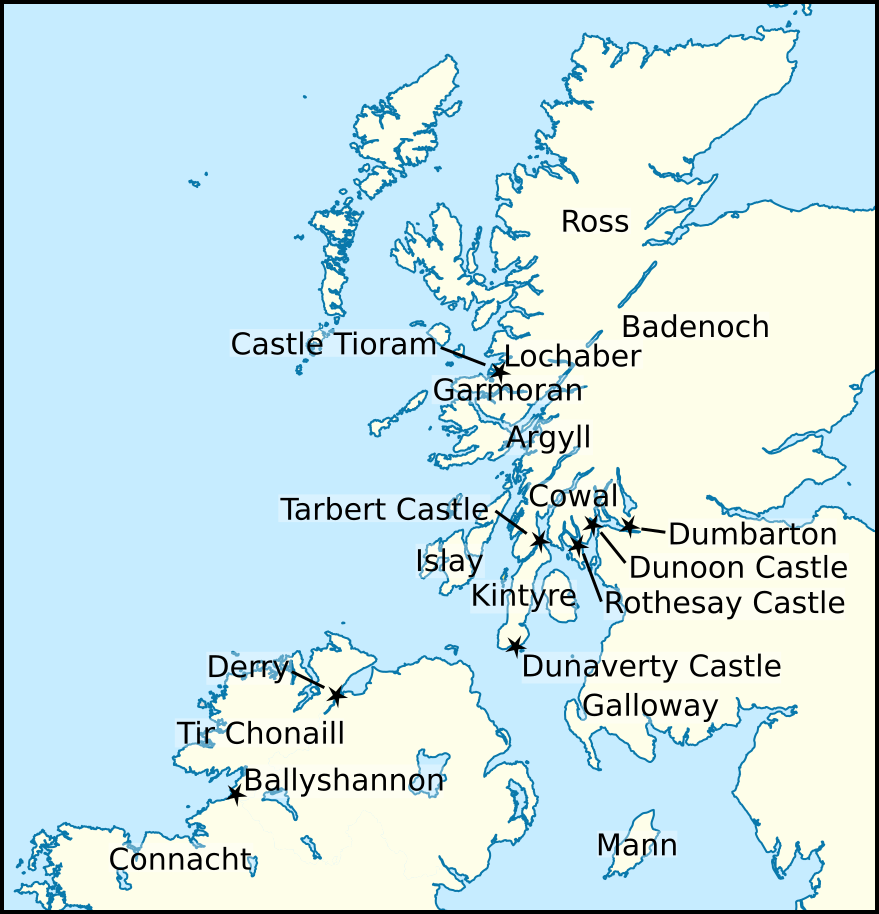
Locations relating to Ruaidhrí's life and times.

Ruaidhrí seems to have been the senior son of Raghnall mac Somhairle. Raghnall was in turn a son of Somhairle mac Giolla Brighde, King of the Isles, the common ancestor of Clann Somhairle. Another son of Somhairle was Dubhghall, eponymous ancestor of Clann Dubhghaill. Ruaidhrí was in turn the eponymous ancestor of Clann Ruaidhrí, whilst his brother, Domhnall, was the eponym of Clann Domhnaill.

There is uncertainty regarding the succession of the Clann Somhairle leadership following Somhairle's death in 1164. Although the thirteenth- to fourteenth-century Chronicle of Mann reports that Dubhghall was the senior dynast in the 1150s, this man's next and last attestation, preserved by the Durham Liber vitae, fails to accord him a royal title. One possibility is that Dubhghall had been succeeded or supplanted by Raghnall, whose recorded title of rex insularum, dominus de Ergile et Kyntyre ("king of the Isles, lord of Argyll and Kintyre") could indicate that Raghnall claimed control over the Clann Somhairle territories. Like Dubhghall, the year and circumstances of Raghnall's death are uncertain as surviving contemporary sources fail to mark his demise.

== Clann Somhairle and the Crovan dynasty ==
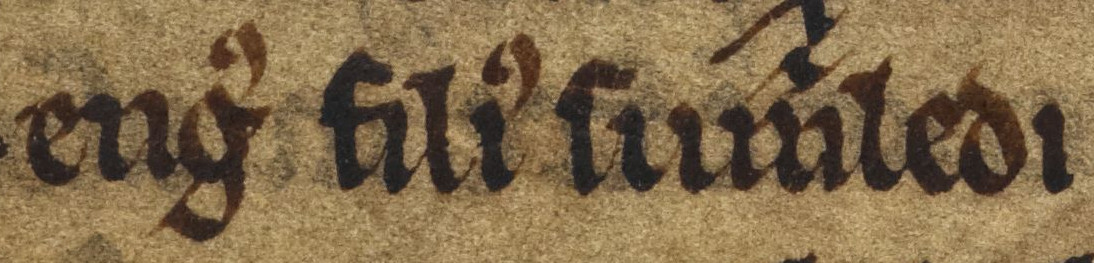
The name of Ruaidhrí's uncle, Aonghus mac Somhairle, as it appears on folio 41r of British Library Cotton Julius A VII (the Chronicle of Mann): "Engus filius Sumerledi". Ruaidhrí and his brother, Domhnall, may have been responsible for the death of Aonghus and his sons.

The first specific record of Ruaidhrí dates to 1213/1214. About five years beforehand, however, the sons of Raghnall are recorded by the fifteenth- to sixteenth-century Annals of Ulster to have attacked the men of Skye, in an entry that may be evidence that Raghnall's sons were attempting to extend their authority over the island. The following year, the Chronicle of Mann reports that the three sons of Aonghus mac Somhairle, as well as Aonghus himself, were slain in battle on Skye. The record of this bloody encounter seems to indicate that Aonghus had succeeded Raghnall as the representative of Clann Somhairle by this date, and that Raghnall's sons responded by eliminating their uncle and his line. If so, it is possible that Ruaidhrí seized the succession of Clann Somhairle after the annihilation of Aonghus' branch of the kindred. These accounts of Hebridean warfare may, therefore, signify a radical redistribution of the Clann Somhairle imperium.

The name of Ruaidhrí's paternal grandmother, Ragnhildr Óláfsdóttir, as it appears on folio 143r of GKS 1005 fol (Flateyarbók): "Ragnhilldi".

Although the context of the conflict of 1209 is uncertain, one possibility is that it was connected to the clash of 1210. Another possibility is that it related to friction between Clann Somhairle and the Crovan dynasty. The Clann Somhairle claim to the kingship of the Isles seems to have stemmed from its descent from Somhairle's wife, Ragnhildr Óláfsdóttir, granddaughter of the Crovan dynasty's common ancestor. In the mid twelfth century, Somhairle confronted Ragnhildr's brother, Guðrøðr Óláfsson, King of the Isles, and wrested the kingship from him. Somhairle's coup resulted in the division of the Kingdom of the Isles between his descendants and Guðrøðr's.

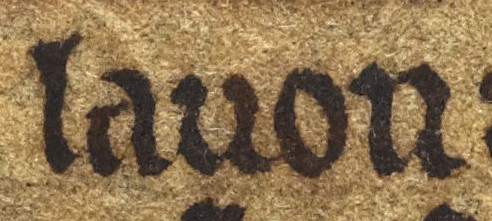
The name of Óláfr Guðrøðarson's wife as it appears on folio 42r of British Library Cotton Julius A VII: "Lauon". This woman seems to have been a close kinswoman of Ruaidhrí, perhaps a daughter.

In the second decade of the century, the Chronicle of Mann reveals that the wife of the reigning representative of the Crovan dynasty, Rǫgnvaldr Guðrøðarson, King of the Isles, was the sister of the bride of Rǫgnvaldr's rival half-brother, Óláfr Guðrøðarson. Although the precise identity of the half-brothers' shared father-in-law is uncertain, the chronicle describes him as a nobleman from Kintyre, which suggests that he was a member of Clann Somhairle, as sources concerning this kindred associate it with Kintyre more than any other region. The half-brother's father-in-law, therefore, may well have been either Raghnall, or Ruaidhrí—both of whom appear to have been styled "Lord of Kintyre" in contemporary sources—or possibly even Domhnall. (Note: One reason why the chronicle fails to name the father-in-law of Rǫgnvaldr and Óláfr could be that the chronicle is biased against him. Another possibility is that the chronicler may have simply not known his name.)

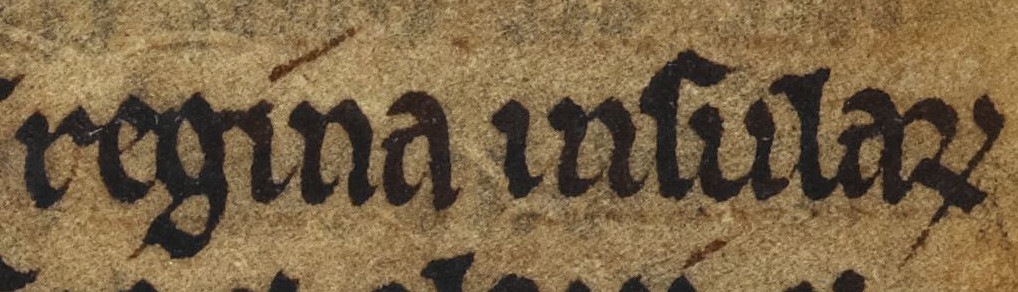
The title of the wife of Rǫgnvaldr Guðrøðarson as it appears on folio 42v of British Library Cotton Julius A VII: "regina Insularum" ("Queen of the Isles").

It is conceivable that Rǫgnvaldr's union dates before 1210, perhaps not long after 1200 considering the age of his son, Guðrøðr Dond, who was active in about 1223. The marital alliance appears to have been orchestrated in an effort to patch up relations between Clann Somhairle and the Crovan dynasty. It is possible that Rǫgnvaldr's kingship was formally recognised by Ruaidhrí as the principal member of Clann Somhairle, and that Ruaidhrí thereby established himself as a leading magnate within a reunified Kingdom of the Isles. Such a development may have taken place at about the time of Aonghus' elimination.

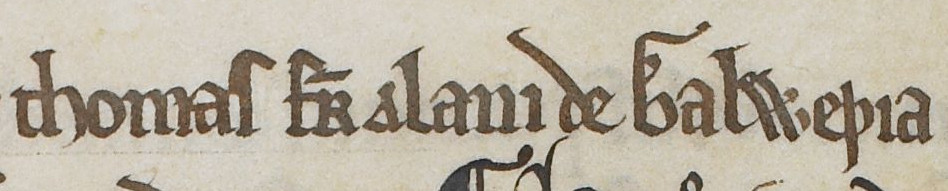
The name of Thomas fitz Roland, and his brother Alan, as they appear on folio 42r of British Library Cotton Faustina B IX (the Chronicle of Melrose): "Thomas frater Alani de Galweþia".

Ruaidhrí is likely one of the unnamed sons of Raghnall who is recorded by various Irish annals to have campaigned with Thomas fitz Roland, Earl of Atholl in a fleet of over seventy ships against the Irish in 1211/1212. Ruaidhrí is certainly reported by the same sources to have assisted Thomas in ravaging Derry and the surrounding countryside again in 1213/1214. On one hand, these seaborne operations may have been undertaken in the context of supporting the Irish interests of Rǫgnvaldr, who seems to have been under pressure at about this period. The attacks could indicate that Thomas and his Clann Somhairle allies were supporting the cause of the English Crown in Ireland, and were coordinated with the campaigning of the English justiciar, John de Grey, Bishop of Norwich. Like his kinsman Rǫgnvaldr, Thomas was the recipient of an English grant of Irish lands at about this time. It is also possible that the raids were conducted in specific regard to the interests of both the Scottish and English Crowns, and particularly aimed at limiting Irish support of the Meic Uilleim, a disaffected rival branch of the Scottish royal family. (Note: It is possible that the first recorded raid by Thomas and the sons of Raghnall was the catalyst for the tribute that Áed Méith Ua Néill seems to have rendered to the English at about that time. There is reason to suspect that Áed Méith had been lending support to the Meic Uilleim. In the first decade of the thirteenth century, the Clann Somhairle leadership evidently established a Benedictine abbey on Iona. In 1204, the Annals of Ulster and the Annals of the Four Masters report that the monastery was burnt to the ground by a force of Irish clerics, who thereupon installed the Abbot of Derry as Abbot of Iona. As such, there is reason to suspect that there was some sort of connection between the invasion of 1204 and those of 1211/1212 and 1213/1214.)

== Confrontation with the Scottish Crown ==
=== Expulsion from Kintyre ===
The seal of Alexander II depicting the king as a mounted knight. The warrior wears a flat-topped helmet fitted with a visor, whilst a long surcoat is worn over the hauberk. A lion rampant is depicted upon the king's shield.

In 1221/1222, Alexander II, King of Scotland seems to have overseen a series of invasions into Argyll, as evidenced by sources such as the thirteenth-century Gesta Annalia I, the fifteenth-century Scotichronicon, and the fifteenth-century Orygynale Cronykil of Scotland. According to the former source, the king personally led the first of two incursions in 1221. Although this operation is stated to have been curtailed by adverse weather, it is said to have been followed by a resoundingly successful offensive the year after. The campaign itself marks the earliest point at which the region was drawn into the Scottish realm. In fact, there is reason to suspect that the inhabitants of Argyll were unlikely to have regarded themselves as Scots until the midpoint of the century. As a result of this aggressive projection of royal authority, Alexander seems to have gained the pacification of Kintyre, Knapdale, Cowal, and the islands of the Firth of Clyde. Such success may account for the commencement of the royal castle of Tarbert, the conferment of burghal status on Dumbarton shortly afterwards, (Note: Burghs were commonly created to act as peripheral outposts of royal authority.) and the notice of a royal constable at Dunoon—a record that appears to reveal the construction of a castle onsite and the transfer of Cowal to Walter fitz Alan II, Steward of Scotland. It is evident that the amicable cooperation between Ruaidhrí and Thomas had ended by the early 1220s. As the king's principal adherents in the maritime west, Thomas and his brother, Alan fitz Roland, Lord of Galloway, likely played a leading role in the king's operations. The former was certainly active in naval operations between the Hebrides and Ireland in 1221/1222, when he defeated a Hebridean fleet en route to Ireland. One possibility is that this particular action concerned the disruption of Clann Somhairle assistance to Irish kindreds opposed to English interests in Ireland.

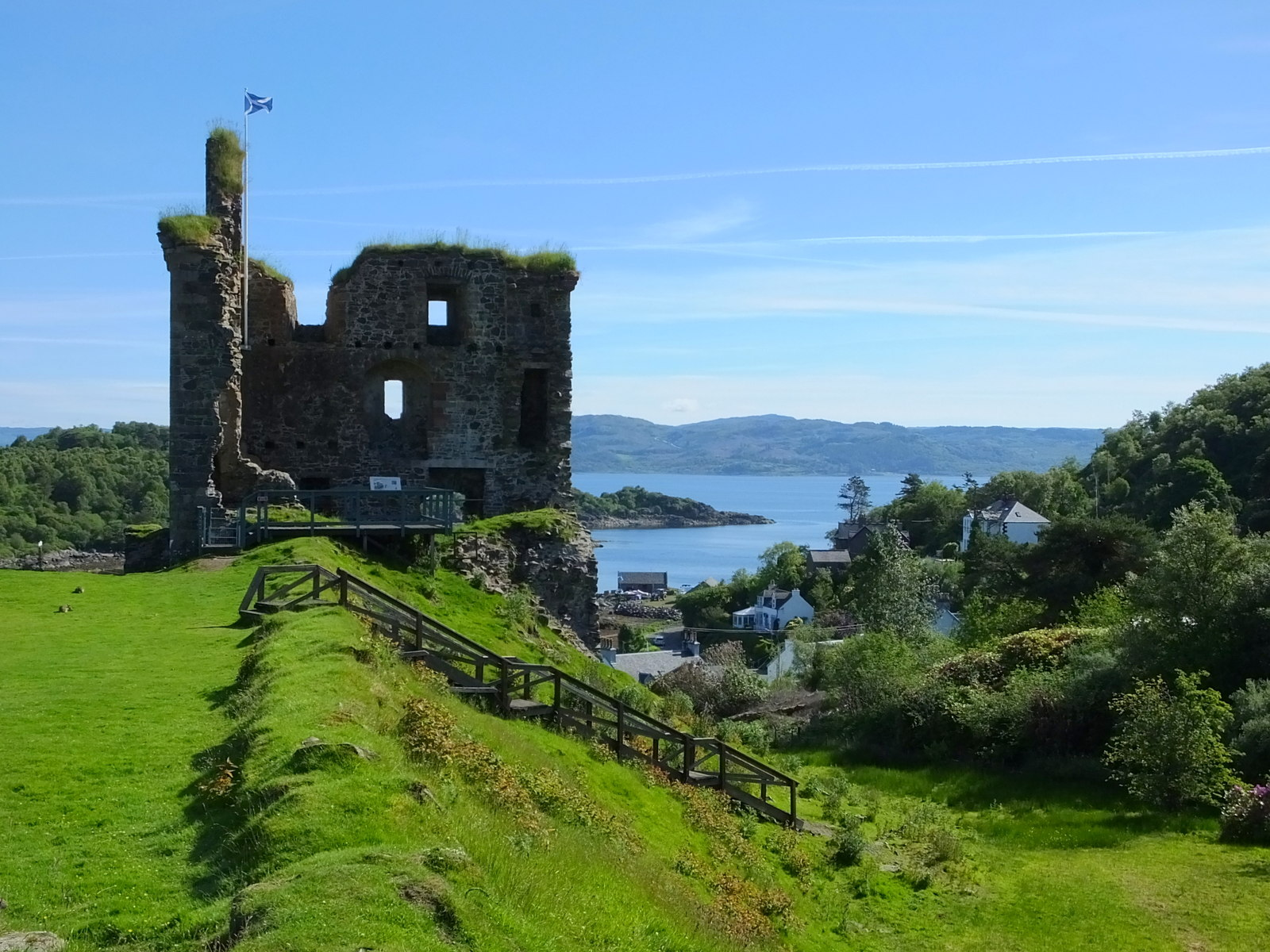
Ruinous Tarbert Castle. This royal fortress in northern Kyntyre seems to have been constructed in the aftermath of the Scottish campaign against Ruaidhrí. Much of the castle's visible remains date to work undertaken in the 1320s and about 1500.

There is reason to suspect that Alexander's campaign resulted in a local regime change, with Ruaidhrí being replaced by Domhnall in Kintyre. For example, whilst Ruaidhrí is recorded to have held lands in Kintyre during the thirteenth century, a later charter of Domhnall's son, Aonghus Mór, specifically locates one of the latter's ecclesiastical possessions "in my land which is called Kintyre". Although Clann Domhnall is well attested in Kintyre later in the century, there is no further evidence of Ruaidhrí or his Clann Ruaidhrí descendants on the peninsula. If Domhnall indeed replaced Ruaidhrí in the region it does not necessarily mean that he sided with the Scots against his brother: for example, although submission to the Scottish Crown seems to have been unpalatable to Ruaidhrí, Domhnall may have been more willing to endure Scottish overlordship. According to Gesta Annalia I, upon the conclusion of the Scottish campaign, some of the men of Argyll offered Alexander money and hostages for a grant of peace. Other men of the region are said to have fled the region, whereafter the same source states that Alexander granted away their lands and possessions to his own followers.

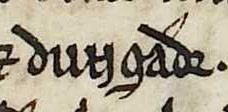
The name of Donnchadh mac Dubhghaill, a leading member of Clann Dubhghaill, as it appears on folio 103r of AM 45 fol (Codex Frisianus): "Dunngaðr".

Another beneficiary of Ruaidhrí's apparent ousting may have been Donnchadh mac Dubhghaill, who seems to have become the principal member of Clann Somhairle at about this time. Donnchadh may have capitalised on the resulting power vacuum in Argyll, and seems to have been entrusted with the Lordship of Argyll as a vassal of Alexander. Ruaidhrí's expulsion may have also been connected to the apparent marriage alliance between his kindred and the Crovan dynasty. Since the majority of Ruaidhrí's territories appear to have been mainland possessions, it is very likely that Alexander regarded this alliance and apparent reunification of the Isles as a threat to his own claims of overlordship of Argyll. Apprehension of this rejuvenated island realm may have been one of the factors that led to the Scots' invasion and Ruaidhrí's expulsion. In fact, the Chronicle of Mann reveals that, also in about 1221/1222, Óláfr was freed from his marriage by his apparent adherent, Reginaldus, Bishop of the Isles, after which Óláfr married a daughter of Fearchar mac an tSagairt, Earl of Ross. The latter was an emerging magnate closely linked to the Scottish Crown, and it is likely that Óláfr's realignment with such a figure was influenced by the concurrent campaign against Ruaidhrí, and was perhaps intended by the Scots to further destabilise the Isles.

According to the thirteenth-century Hákonar saga Hákonarsonar, Hákon Hákonarson, King of Norway was visited by a certain Gillikristr, Óttar Snækollsson, and many Islesmen, who presented the king with letters concerning certain needs of their lands. Although it is possible that these men visited Norway with news regarding the kin-strife between Rǫgnvaldr and Óláfr, another possibility is that the delegation was concerned with the threat of Scottish aggression in the Isles, following the Scottish Crown's conquest of Kintyre in 1221/1222.

=== Adherent of the Meic Uilleim insurgency ===
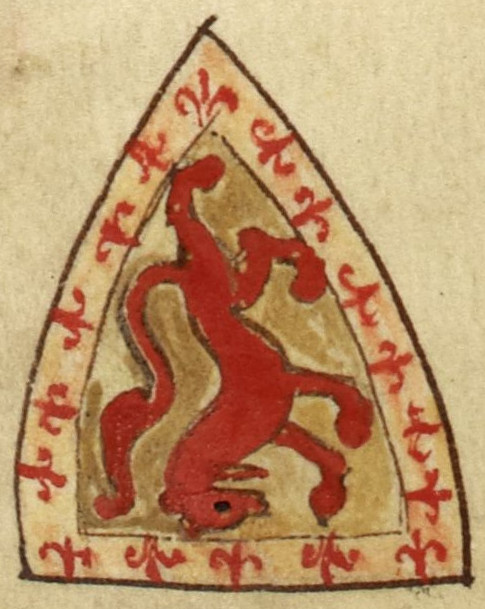
Coat of arms of Alexander II as it appears on folio 146v of British Library Royal 14 C VII (Historia Anglorum). The inverted shield represents the king's death in 1249.

According to Gesta Annalia I, at some point in the 1220s the Meic Uilleim again rose in revolt, with the source identifying the participating Meic Uilleim faction members as: Giolla Easpaig, his unnamed sons, and a certain Roderick. Whilst this source is echoed by Scotichronicon, the wording of the version of events preserved by the fourteenth-century Chronicle of Lanercost seems to isolate Roderick from being a member of the Meic Uilleim.

The fact that Gesta Annalia I is a more contemporary source suggests that its identification of Roderick as a member of the Meic Uilleim may be more accurate than the less than unambiguous wording of the Chronicle of Lanercost. Nevertheless, if the latter source is to be believed, it could be evidence that this man is identical to Ruaidhrí himself. Although the sources that note Roderick's participation in the last Meic Uilleim revolt reveal that the kindred was utterly overcome and apparently extirpated, the fate of Roderick is not recorded. If Ruaidhrí is indeed identifical to Roderick, it is uncertain when he may have initiated such assistance to the insurgency. One possibility is that Ruaidhrí had supported the uprisings of the Meic Uilleim in the 1210s, which in turn could account for his dispossession from Kintyre. Evidence against such an early alliance may be the annalistic evidence of Ruaidhrí's attacks in Ireland in 1211/1212 and 1213/1214, if these operations were indeed conducted on behalf of the Scottish Crown against Irish associates of the Meic Uilleim. In fact, it may have only been after his expulsion that Ruaidhrí was compelled to align himself with Alexander's Meic Uilleim enemies.

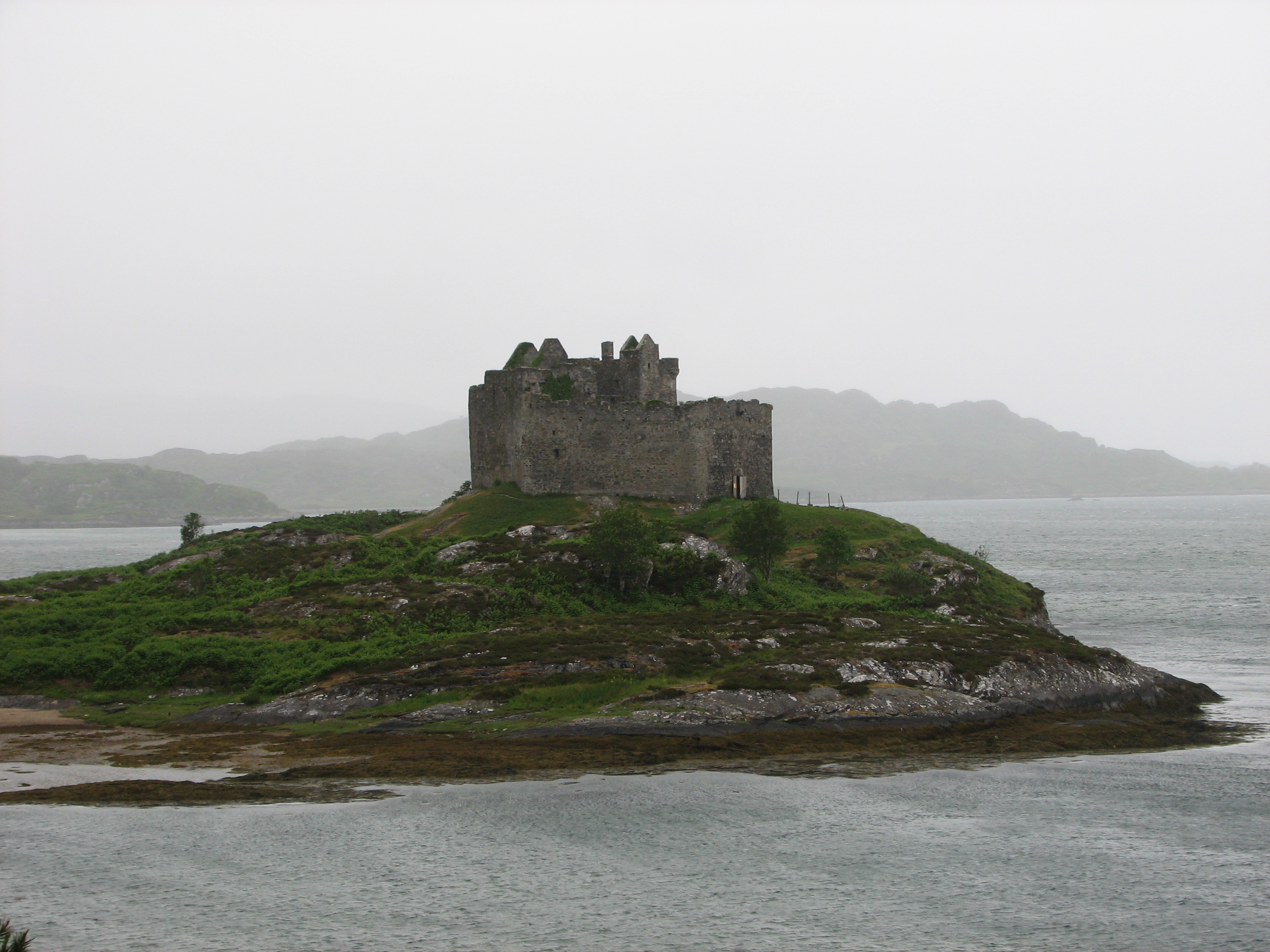
Now-ruinous Castle Tioram may well have been a stronghold of Ruaidhrí's Clann Ruaidhrí descendants, and possibly even of Ruaidhrí himself.

Although it is possible that Ruaidhrí controlled the lands that made up Garmoran and various islands in the Hebrides, there is uncertainty as to how and when these territories entered into the possession of his family. Later leading members of Clann Ruaidhrí certainly possessed these lands, but evidence of custody before the mid thirteenth century is lacking. (Note: One possibility is that Ruaidhrí gained Garmoran in the aftermath of the extirpation of Aonghus' line. Another possibility is that Ruaidhrí's descendants acquired Garmoran and the outer Hebridean islands after the eclipse of Norwegian sovereignty in the Isles following the Treaty of Perth in 1266. Alternately, Clann Ruaidhrí's holdings in Garmoran and the Isles could have stemmed from compensation received from Óláfr in light of his marriage to a kinswoman of Ruaidhrí. Another possibility is that the mainland territories of Clann Ruaidhrí were lands earlier possessed by Somhairle, and that the island territories passed from the Crovan dynasty to Clann Somhairle by way of Ragnhildr.)

Seemingly as a consequence of the Comyn family's part in the suppression of the Meic Uilleim revolt, Walter Comyn acquired the Highland lordships of Badenoch and Lochaber in 1229×1234. If Ruaidhrí and Roderick are indeed one and the same—and Ruaidhrí indeed possessed Garmoran—the proximity between this province to Badenoch and Lochaber could indicate that these territories had been centres of the Meic Uilleim insurrection. As such, Ruaidhrí would have been well placed to harbour the Meic Uilleim in Garmoran. Ruaidhrí's possession of Garmoran would also mean that the king's grant to the Comyn kindred placed Walter Comyn upon the borders of both Donnchadh and Ruaidhrí. Alexander, therefore, may have intended for the Comyns to exert pressure upon their Clann Somhairle neighbours. The fact that no disturbances are recorded in the region after 1230 could be evidence that the king was successful in such machinations.

=== Óspakr-Hákon's invasion of the Isles ===
The name of Óspakr-Hákon, an apparent Clann Somhairle dynast, as it appears on folio 163v of AM 47 fol (Eirspennill): "Uspakr konungr".

Meanwhile, in the Isles, the struggle between Rǫgnvaldr and Óláfr for the kingship continued on. Although Rǫgnvaldr had enlisted Alan fitz Roland's support by way of a marital alliance, Óláfr seized the kingship of the Isles in 1226, and slew Rǫgnvaldr three years later. The death of Alan fitz Roland's ally did not deter Gallovidian interests in the Isles. In fact, it is apparent that Alan fitz Roland and members of Clann Dubhghaill upheld pressure upon the recently inaugurated Óláfr. Reports of open warfare in the Isles reached the royal court of Hákon in the summer of 1229. Although Óláfr arrived at the Norwegian court early the next year, having been forced from the Isles by Alan fitz Roland and his allies, it is evident that Hákon had already decided upon a course of action. As a matter of fact, the Norwegian king is recorded to have handed over the kingship of the Isles to an apparent member of Clann Dubhghaill named Óspakr, and further bestowed upon this man the royal name Hákon, giving him command of the Norwegian fleet tasked with restoring peace in the Isles.

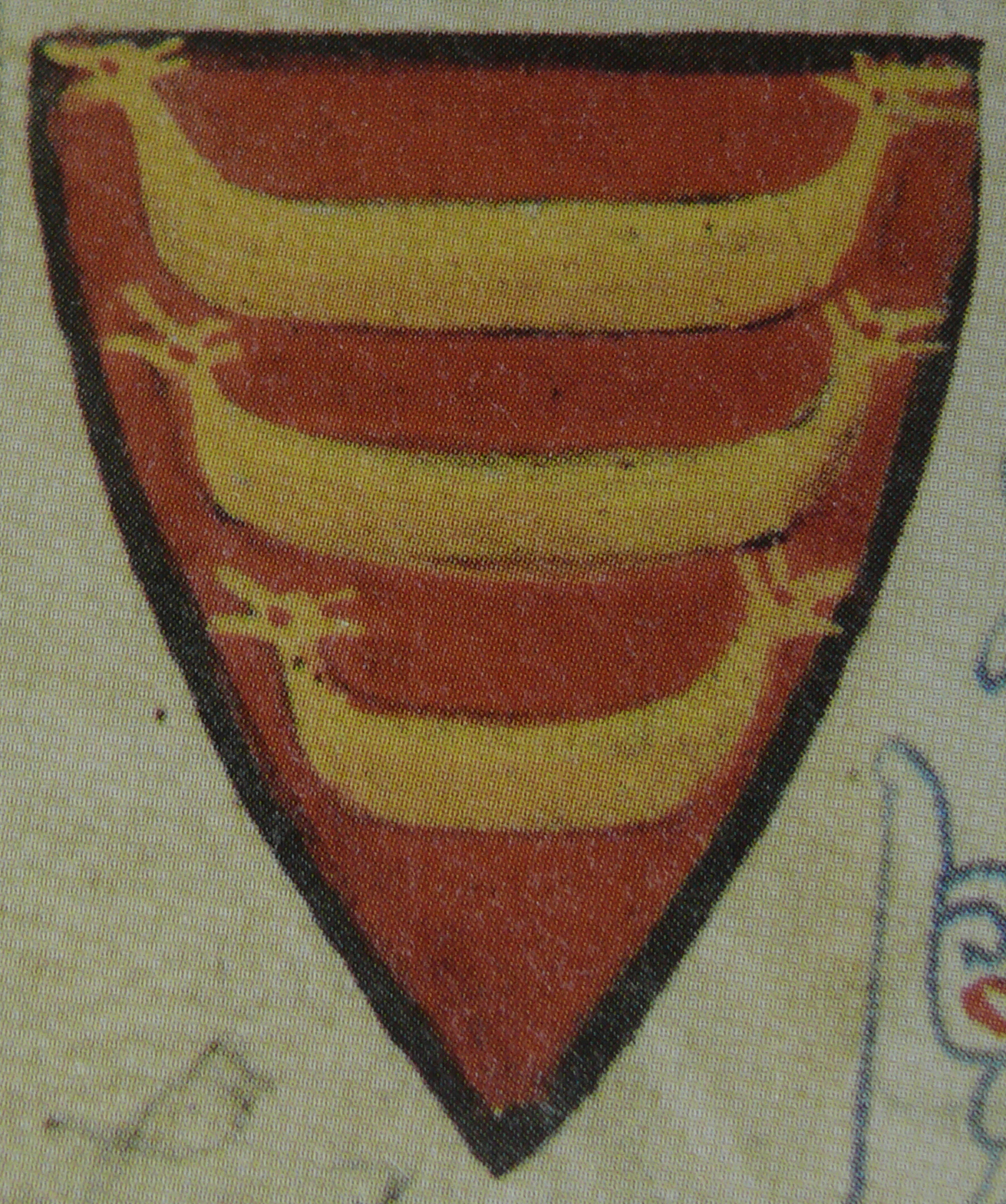
Coat of arms of Hákon Hákonarson as depicted on folio 216v of Cambridge Corpus Christi College Parker Library 16II (Chronica Majora). (Note: This coat of arms is blazoned: gules, three galleys with dragon heads at each end or, one above the other. The coat of arms concerns Hákon's coronation, and its associated caption reads in Latin: "Scutum regis Norwagiae nuper coronati, qui dicitur rex Insularum". The coat of arms was illustrated by Matthew Paris, a man who met Hákon in 1248/1249, the year after the king's coronation. The emphasise that Matthew placed upon the Norwegian realm's sea power appears to be underscored in the heraldry he attributed to Hákon.)

Having arrived in the Isles not long afterwards, Hákonar saga Hákonarsonar reports that Óspakr-Hákon's fleet linked forces with other leading members of Clann Dubhghaill at Islay. The reason why Ruaidhrí and Domhnall are unrecorded in the context of the campaign is uncertain. Not only had Ruaidhrí suffered from Alexander's encroachment, but his maternal kinsman, Guðrøðr Dond, played a prominent part in the campaign. If Ruaidhrí indeed partook in the final Meic Uilleim rebellion, his apparent absence from Óspakr-Hákon's campaign could be evidence that his desire for requital against the Scots was temporarily sated, or that he had perished with the Meic Uilleim.

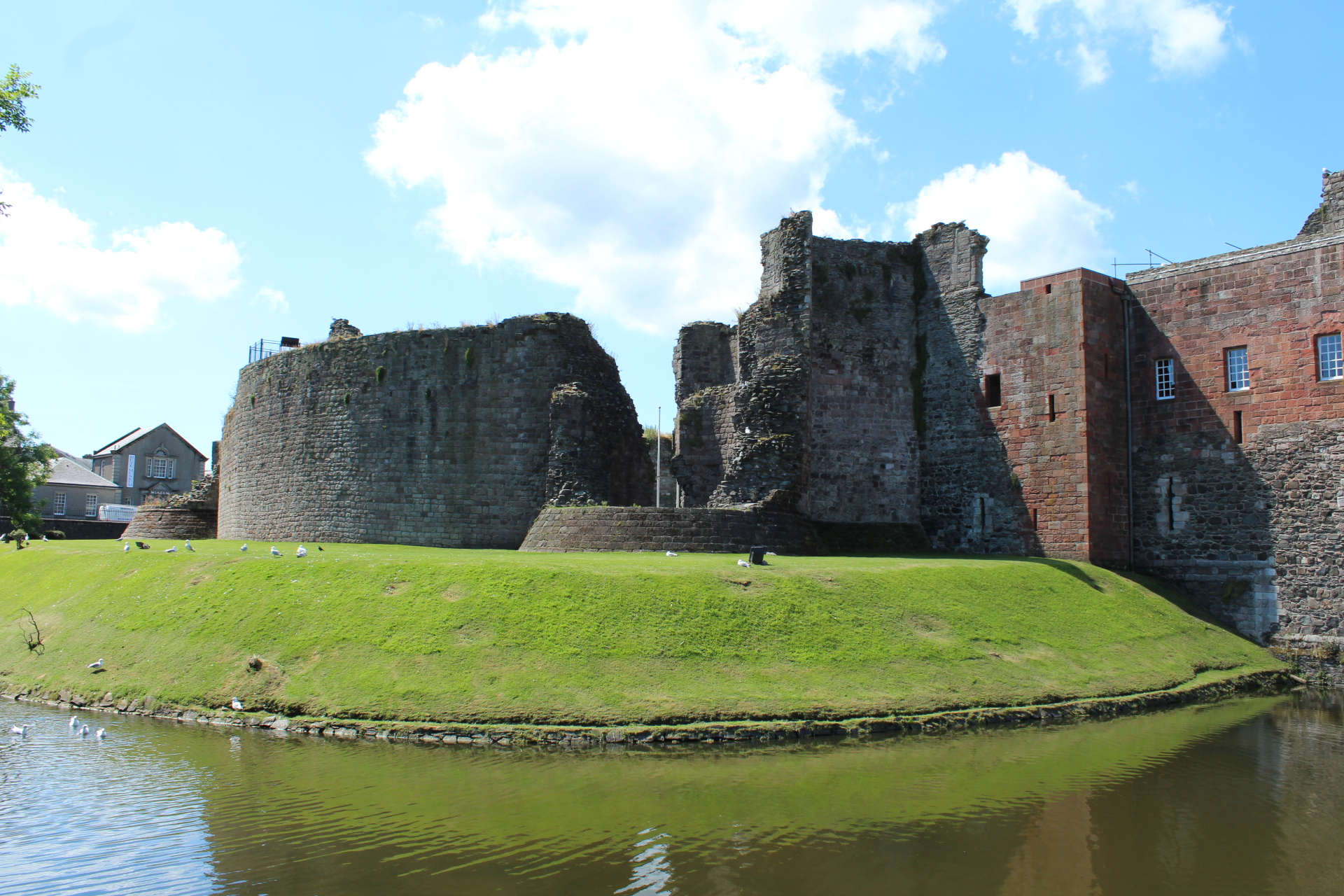
Ruinous Rothesay Castle on Bute. In 1230, the fortress fell to Óspakr-Hákon. The island seems to have passed from Clann Somhairle to the ancestors of the Stewart kindred sometime between the last decades of the twelfth century and the first decades of the thirteenth century. (Note: In 1263, in the course of Hákon's campaign against the Scots, the castle again fell to Norwegian forces. According to Hákonar saga Hákonarsonar, one particular figure who played a part in the castle's fall was a ship-commander named Ruðri, a man who swore allegiance to Hákon with his two brothers. Ruðri is recorded to have claimed Bute as his birthright, stating that he had been outlawed by the Scottish Crown for attempting to take back what was rightfully his. After Hákon's forces ravaged the island and captured the castle, Ruðri is recorded to have slaughtered the Scottish prisoners, and to have devastated the Scottish mainland far and wide. The castle itself—and the surrounding settlement of Rothesay—may owe its name to Ruðri, or perhaps to an ancestor of his. Although Ruðri's exact identity is unknown, he could well have been a member of Clann Somhairle. One possibility is that he was a son or grandson of Óspakr. Another is that he was a descendant of Ruaidhrí.)

The fact that Óláfr's previous struggle against Alan fitz Roland and Clann Somhairle is acclaimed by Hákonar saga Hákonarsonar suggests that Hákon did not intend to replace Óláfr with Óspakr-Hákon. Instead, Hákon seems to have planned for Óspakr-Hákon to reign over the sprawling domain of Clann Somhairle in an attempt to ensure this kindred's obedience. Óspakr-Hákon's prospective realm, therefore, may have comprised Argyll, Kintyre, and the Inner Hebrides. If correct, Ruaidhrí's nonappearance in the campaign may have been due to resentment of Óspakr-Hákon's prospective overlordship. Domhnall's absence, on the other hand, could relate to the fact that he seems to have come to an accommodation with the Scottish Crown in the wake of Ruaidhrí's expulsion, and to have owed his lordship in Kintyre to Alexander. If correct, the Norwegian muster off Islay may be indicative of an attempt by Óspakr-Hákon to overawe Domhnall. Whatever the case, Óspakr-Hákon's fleet afterwards entered the Firth of Clyde, and made landfall on Bute, where his forces successfully stormed and captured the island's fortress, a stronghold that is almost certainly identical to Rothesay Castle. The castle itself was a holding of Walter fitz Alan II, and the attack upon it seems to evince the anxiety felt by Clann Somhairle in the face of the steward's steadily increasing regional influence.

== Mac Somhairle ==
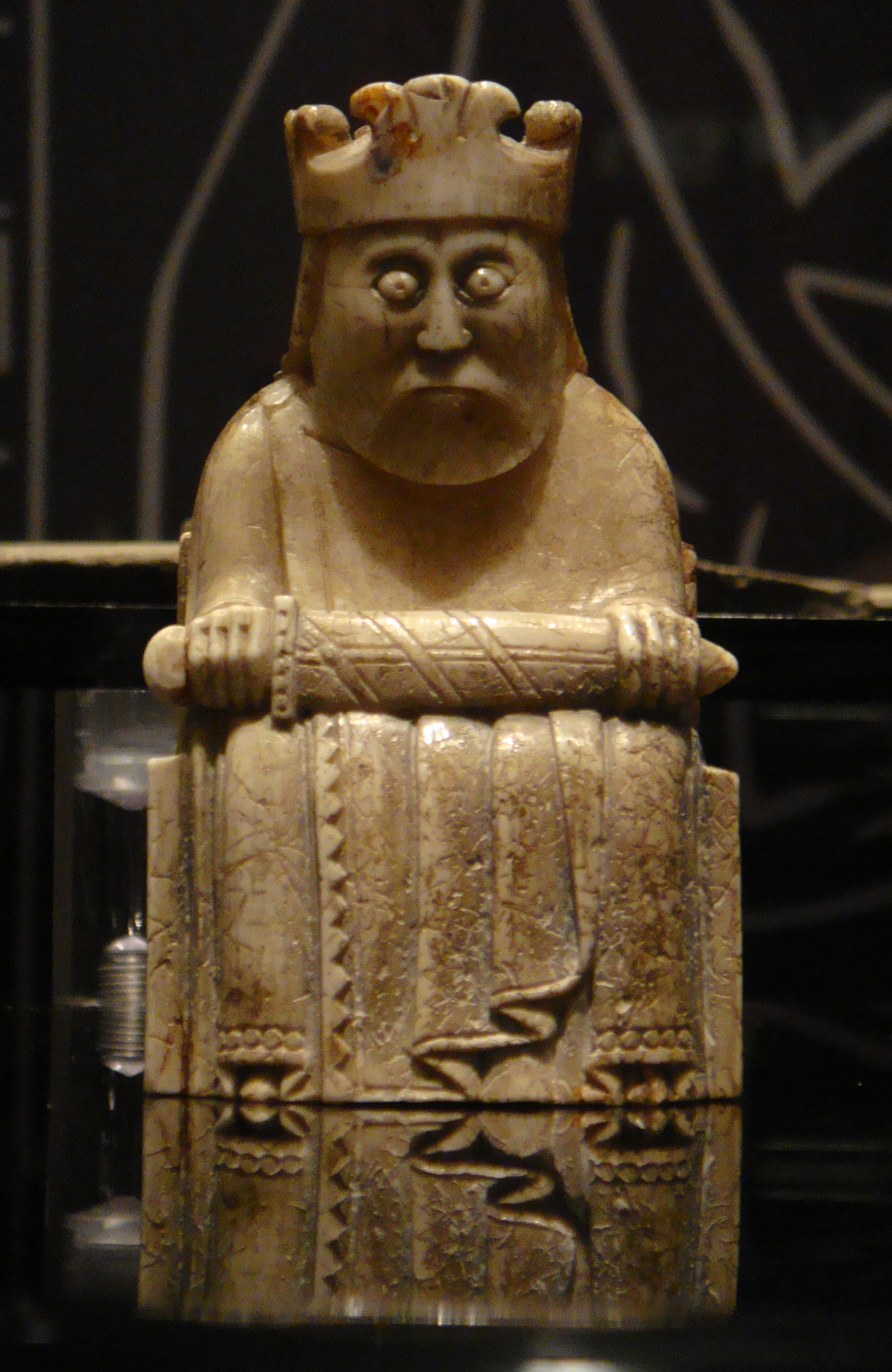
A king gaming piece of the so-called Lewis chessmen. Comprising some four sets, the pieces are thought to have been crafted in Norway in the twelfth- and thirteenth centuries. They were uncovered in Lewis in the early nineteenth century.

Despite the ambiguous evidence concerning Roderick, the last record of Ruaidhrí is the undated record of his lordship in Kintyre. It may be that the creation of the Comyn lordship of Badenoch and Lochaber, together with the establishment of various lordships throughout Great Glen, and the foundation of Fearchar's Earldom of Ross, successfully served to neutralise Ruaidhrí—if he indeed possessed Garmoran.

In 1248, both Ruaidhrí's succeeding son, Dubhghall, and Donnchadh's succeeding son, Eóghan, are stated by Hákonar saga Hákonarsonar to have arrived in Norway, with both men seeking the kingship of the northern Suðreyjar from Hákon. The entirety of the Suðreyjar—an Old Norse term meaning "Southern Islands"—roughly equates to the Hebrides and Mann. The precise jurisdiction that Dubhghall and Eóghan competed for is uncertain. For example, the northern Hebridean islands of Lewis and Harris and Skye appear to have been held by the Crovan dynasty, then represented by Óláfr's succeeding son, Haraldr Óláfsson, King of the Isles. One possibility is that Eóghan and Dubhghall sought kingship of the same jurisdiction that Hákon had awarded to Óspakr-Hákon about a decade before.

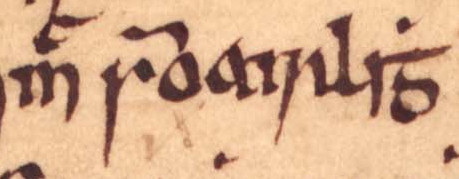
The name of Mac Somhairle, a man who may be identical to Ruaidhrí, as it appears on folio 67r of Oxford Bodleian Library Rawlinson B 489.

Although 1247 was also the year of Hákon's royal coronation, and it is possible that the arrival of the Clann Somhairle dynasts was a result of the reimposition of Norwegian overlordship in the Isles, another reason for their arrival may relate to the death of a certain Mac Somhairle—an apparent member of Clann Somhairle—slain whilst resisting an English invasion of Tír Chonaill in 1247. Merely a year before, Haraldr seems to have submitted to Henry III, King of England, and it is possible that Hákon had consequently recognised Mac Somhairle's kingship in the Isles in retaliation to Haraldr's acceptance of English overtures. If correct, the voyage of Dubhghall and Eóghan to Norway may reveal that both men sought to succeed their fallen kinsman in the Isles. Although the identity of Mac Somhairle uncertain, he may well be indentitical to Ruaidhrí himself. Certainly, Dubhghall's presence in Norway suggests that he was indeed dead by this date. (Note: Another candidate for the slain Mac Somhairle includes Domhnall, although the Chronicle of Mann seems to reveal that Domhnall was still alive later in the century. Eóghan's father is yet another candidate, especially in light of the fact that the titles accorded to Mac Somhairle refer to Argyll and not Kintyre where Domhnall seems to have held lordship after Ruaidhrí's expulsion. However, the fact that Donnchadh was active in 1175—over seventy years before Mac Somhairle's demise—seems to be evidence against the possibility that Donnchadh and Mac Somahairle were one and the same. So too may be the fact that Eóghan is recorded to have granted property to the Diocese of Argyll in 1240, which could be evidence that Donnchadh was dead by this date. Another Clann Dubhghaill candidate is Donnchadh's younger brother, Dubhghall, who—like Donnchadh—was accorded kingly status by Hákonar saga Hákonarsonar in its account of the lead-up to Óspakr-Hákon's campaign.)

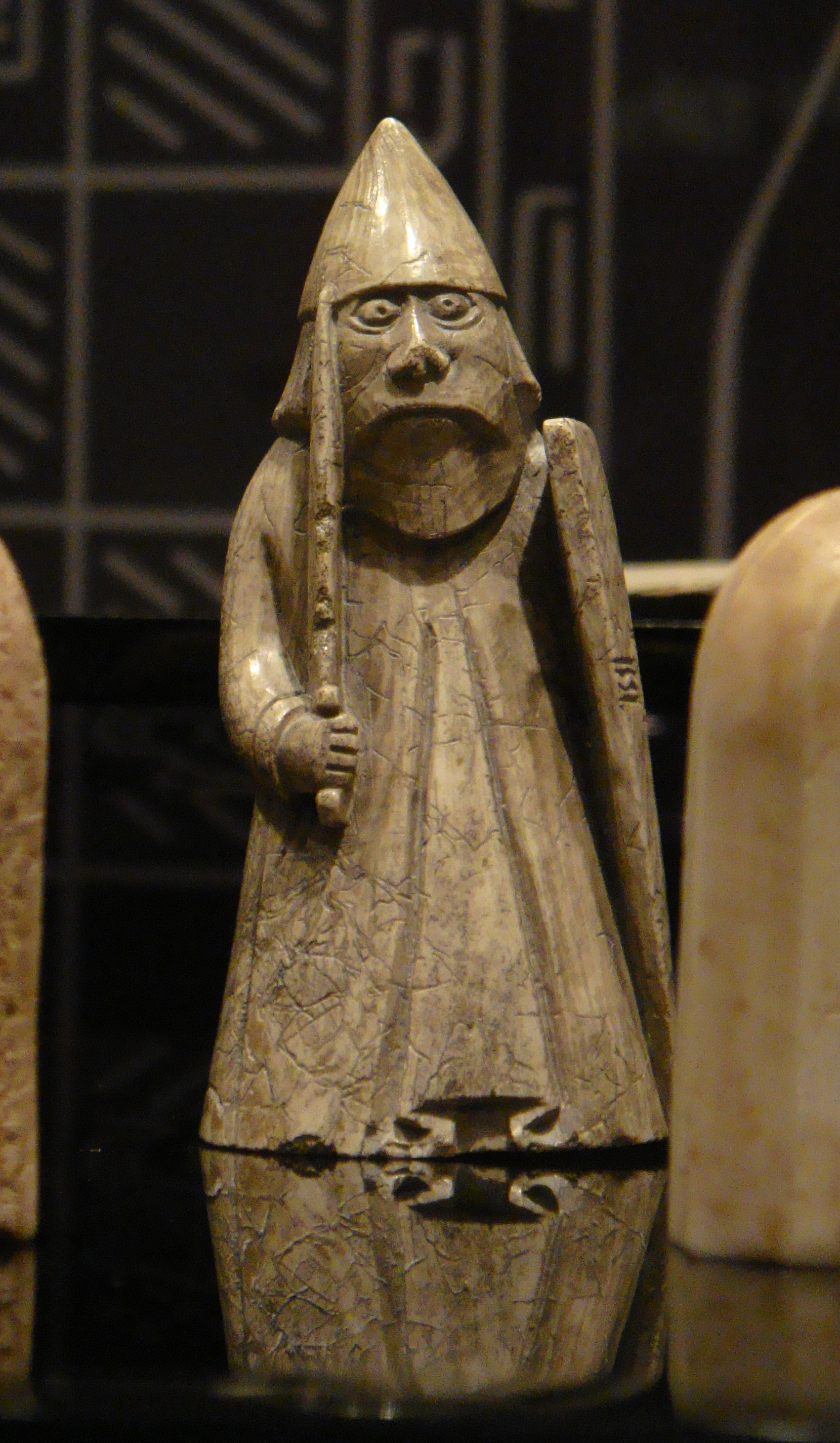
A rook gaming piece of the Lewis chessmen. The Scandinavian connections of leading members of the Isles may have been reflected in their military armament, and could have resembled that depicted upon such gaming pieces.

An alliance with a ruler of the Isles would have certainly benefited Henry's ongoing military operations in Ireland, and it is possible that it was Haraldr's pact with him that had prompted Mac Somhairle's involvement against the English in Ireland. In fact, Clann Somhairle may have faced immediate repercussions for their alignment with the Norwegian Crown. For example, English financial records for 1248 reveal that Walter Bisset was tasked to fortify a castle along the Scottish coast. This castle appears to be that of Dunaverty, seated upon the southern coast of Kintyre. This could indicate that Walter Bisset's Ulster-based actions in Kintyre were undertaken as a means to divide the Isles, isolating Mann from the Hebrides. If Ruaidhrí is indeed identical to Mac Somhairle, and therefore died in 1247, Walter Bisset's activity at Dunaverty could be evidence of him capitalising upon a fortress that had formerly been held by Ruaidhrí. Apparently in about the same year that the Bissets seized Dunaverty, Thomas' illegitimate son, Alan, stormed the castle in a devastating attack that may have culminated in the capture Walter Bisset himself. Alan's attack upon the Bissets may have been partly connected to the activities of Clann Somhairle in Ireland.

Three noble smooth-skinned bodies, three generous heroes who had stood in every gap—not simply three men but three lords—lay about the every changing (Síodh) Aodha.

Three noble dragons needing no incitement, three heroes side by side, lie in one fair tapering grace; long shall that Wednesday be remembered.

— excerpt from an elegy to Maol Seachlainn Ó Domhnaill, by Giolla Brighde Mac Con Midhe, lamenting the fall of Maol Seachlainn, An Giolla Muinealach Ó Baoighill, and Mac Somhairle at the Battle of Ballyshannon.

The fall of Mac Somhairle is noted by numerous sources, such as the fifteenth- to sixteenth-century Annals of Connacht, the Annals of Ulster, the seventeenth-century Annals of the Four Masters, and the sixteenth-century Annals of Loch Cé. (Note: Mac Somhairle is accorded the following titles: "ri Airir Gaidil" ("king of Argyle") by the Annals of Connacht, "ticcherna Airer Ghaoidheal" ("Lord of Argyle") by the Annals of the Four Masters, and "ri Airir Gaoidel" ("king of Airer-Gaeidhel") by the Annals of Loch Cé.) At the time of his demise, Mac Somhairle was supporting the cause of Maol Seachlainn Ó Domhnaill, King of Tír Chonaill, who was attempting to halt to expansion of the English when his forces were crushed by Maurice fitz Gerald, Lord of Offaly at Ballyshannon. Not only did Mac Somhairle lose his life in the affair, so too did Maol Seachlainn and the latter's principal underking, An Giolla Muinealach Ó Baoighill. At the time of his fall, Mac Somhairle would have undoubtedly commanded a force of fighting men—known later in the century as gallowglasses—and could have either lent military assistance to the Uí Domhnaill voluntarily, or else marketed such services to the kindred as a mercenary. About a decade after Mac Somhairle's death, Ruaidhrí's son, Dubhghall—also named Mac Somhairle by various Irish annals—is recorded to have fought the English in Connacht, and to have contracted a marital alliance with Aodh na nGall Ó Conchobhair, who thereby received a tocher that included one hundred and sixty gallowglass warriors commanded by Ruaidhrí's younger son, Ailéan. (Note: The attested cooperation between the families of Ruaidhrí and Thomas fitz Roland may account for Ailéan's name. The father of Thomas was Roland fitz Uhtred, Lord of Galloway. The latter's acceptance of Alan as the name of his eldest son and heir could be evidence of French influence upon his family. In the twelfth century Roland's family increasingly involved itself with families of Continental origin. The association of Ruaidhrí and his brother with the sons of Roland may also cast light on the identity of the Islesmen who are stated to have supported the Gallovidian rebellion of Alan's illegitimate son, Thomas, against the Scottish Crown in 1235.) Ruaidhrí's Clann Ruaidhrí descendants are recorded to have acted in Ireland as gallowglass commanders as late as the mid fourteenth century.
