= List of rulers of the Kingdom of the Isles =

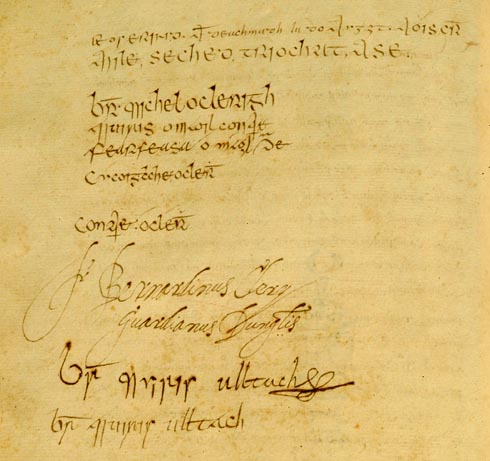
Signature page from the Annals of the Four Masters

The Kingdom of the Isles comprised the Hebrides, the islands of the Firth of Clyde and the Isle of Man from the 9th to the 13th centuries AD. The islands were known to the Norse as the Suðreyjar, or "Southern Isles" as distinct from the Norðreyjar or Northern Isles of Orkney and Shetland. The historical record is incomplete and the kingdom was probably not a continuous entity throughout the entire period. The islands concerned are sometimes referred to as the "Kingdom of Mann and the Isles", although only some of the later rulers claimed that title. (Note: McDonald (2007) states of Raghnall mac Gofraidh: "Some of his successors were grandly styled Rex Manniae et Insularum, 'King of Man and the Isles' ", implying the title had not been used prior to that time, i.e. the early 13th century.) At times the rulers were independent of external control, although for much of the period they had overlords in Norway, Ireland, England, Scotland or Orkney. At times there also appear to have been competing claims for all or parts of the territory. The islands involved have a total land area of over 8,300 square kilometres (3,205 sq mi) (Note: This is the combined land area of the Isle of Man the islands of the Clyde, the Inner Hebrides and the Outer Hebrides.) and extend for more than 500 kilometres (310 mi) from north to south.

Viking influence in the area commenced in the late 8th century, and whilst there is no doubt that the Uí Ímair dynasty played a prominent role in this early period, the records for the dates and details of the rulers are speculative until the mid-10th century. Hostility between the Kings of the Isles and the rulers of Ireland, and intervention by the crown of Norway (either directly or through their vassals the Earls of Orkney) were recurring themes.

Invasion by Magnus Barelegs in the late 11th century resulted in a brief period of direct Norwegian rule over the kingdom, but soon the descendants of Godred Crovan re-asserted a further period of largely independent overlordship. This came to an end with the emergence of Somerled, on whose death in 1164 the kingdom was split in two. Just over a century later the islands became part of the Kingdom of Scotland, following the 1266 Treaty of Perth.

The orthography of the rulers' names is complicated as Old Norse and Gaelic were both spoken throughout the region for much of period under consideration. Thus a single individual might be referred to as Rognvaldr in Icelandic sources, Rag(h)nall in Gaelic, Reginaldus in Latin and perhaps "Rognvald" or "Reginald" in English language sources. (Note: For consistency the regnal names up to the end of the reign of Somerled are as used by Gregory (1881) and by MacDonald (1997) for the period post 1164 unless otherwise indicated. MacDonald does not use patronymics unless otherwise indicated.)

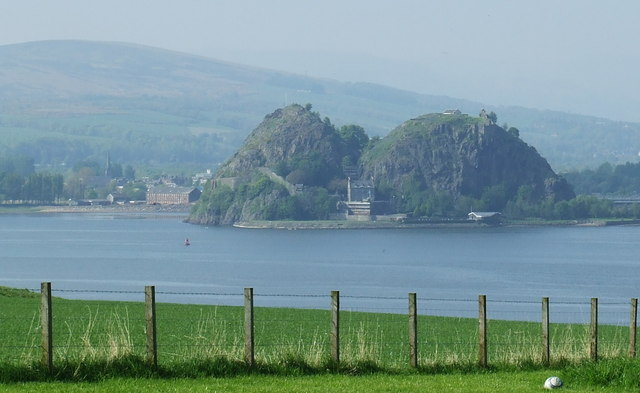
Modern Dumbarton Castle, the site of a 9th-century siege by Ímar and Amlaíb Conung

== 9th and early 10th centuries ==
During this period the historical record is particularly sparse and these early entries must be considered as somewhat speculative.

Ruler of the Hebrides	Dates	Title	Notes
Unknown father of Thórir	848	King of Viking Scotland	According to the Orkneyinga saga Rognvald Eysteinsson had a number of sons including Ivar and Thorir the Silent, Ivar being killed in battle during Harald Fairhair's expedition to the west. According to Irish sources Thorir was the heir of a king of "Viking Scotland" who took an army to Ireland in 848.
Gofraid mac Fergusa	d. 853	Lord of the Hebrides	The Annals of the Four Masters calls him toisech Innsi Gall. (Note: Innsi Gall or in modern usage Innse Gall, meaning "islands of the foreigners or strangers", is a name originally used by mainland Highlanders when the Hebrides were ruled by the Norse and is still occasionally used by Gaelic speakers today to mean the Hebrides/Outer Hebrides.)
Gofraidh	pre 872–873	King of Lochlann	Father of Amlaíb Conung and Ímar
Ímar	873	King of the Norwegian Vikings of the whole of Ireland and Britain	May have succeeded his father briefly
Amlaíb Conung	873	King of the Northmen/King of the Western Sea (Note: Amlaíb Conung was clearly a significant figure and a "king of the Northmen". The title "the greatest warrior king of the Western Sea" (or "West-over-the-sea") is recorded of Olaf the White in the Eyrbyggja Saga and some sources believe these two individuals are one and the same. Amlaíb may have pre-deceased Ímar.)	Ímar's brother
Ásbjǫrn skerjablesi	874		
Ketill Flatnose	c 890–900	King of the Isles	The earliest certain written references to Ketill are from the sagas written 200 years or more after his death. Unlikely to have been ruler of Mann and may have ruled in the mid, rather than late ninth century. (Note: Ketill Flatnose appears in the Laxdœla saga, apparently set in the late ninth century. His daughter, Aud the Deep-Minded married Olaf the White, who some scholars believe to have been Amlaíb Conung, but these dates do not match well as Amlaíb is recorded as coming to Ireland in 853, unless a much earlier date for Ketill's excursions is accepted—which is also necessary for the validity of the proposed identification of Ketill with Caittil Find.)
Unknown	c 900–941		Possibly ruled by Uí Ímair dynasts Ragnall ua Ímair (d. 920/1) who ruled Mann, Sitric Cáech (d. 927), Gofraid ua Ímair (d. 934) and Amlaíb mac Gofraid (d. 941) as Kings of Dublin. (Note: There is no real evidence of Uí Ímair rule in the Isles during this period. For the following century the connection between the Hebrides, Man and Ireland "has been elucidated by Sean Duffy, who has demonstrated that, when control of Dublin passed to the Irish provincial kings in the middle of the eleventh century, these rulers also inherited the old Viking links between Dublin and the Isles".)

It is also possible that Eiríkr, King of York from 947–948 and 952–5, was a ruler in the islands at some stage in the mid-10th century. Eiríkr is believed by some authorities to be synonymous with the saga character Eric Bloodaxe, although the connection is questioned by Downham (2007), who argues that the former was an Uí Ímair dynast rather than a son of Harald Fairhair. A raid on Northumbria in 949, the purpose of which may have been either to support or oppose the kingship of Amlaíb Cuarán is described as predam albidosorum idem nannindisi in the Chronicle of the Kings of Alba. Alfred P. Smyth translated this as "the raid of the men from beyond the spine of Britain, that is, of the islands."

== Late 10th and 11th centuries ==
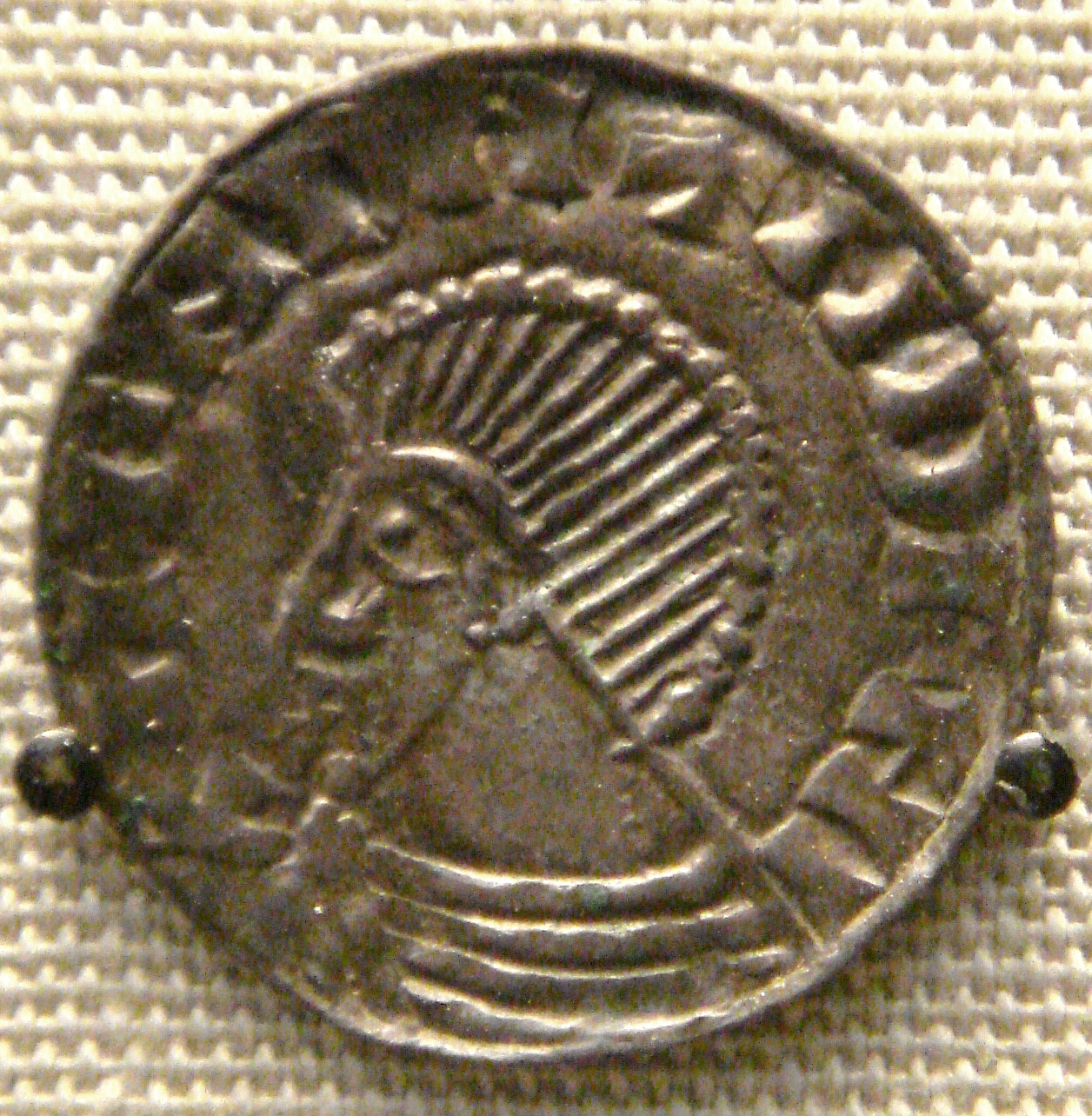
A posthumous "Sihtric" coin from the British Museum, minted at Dublin c. 1050

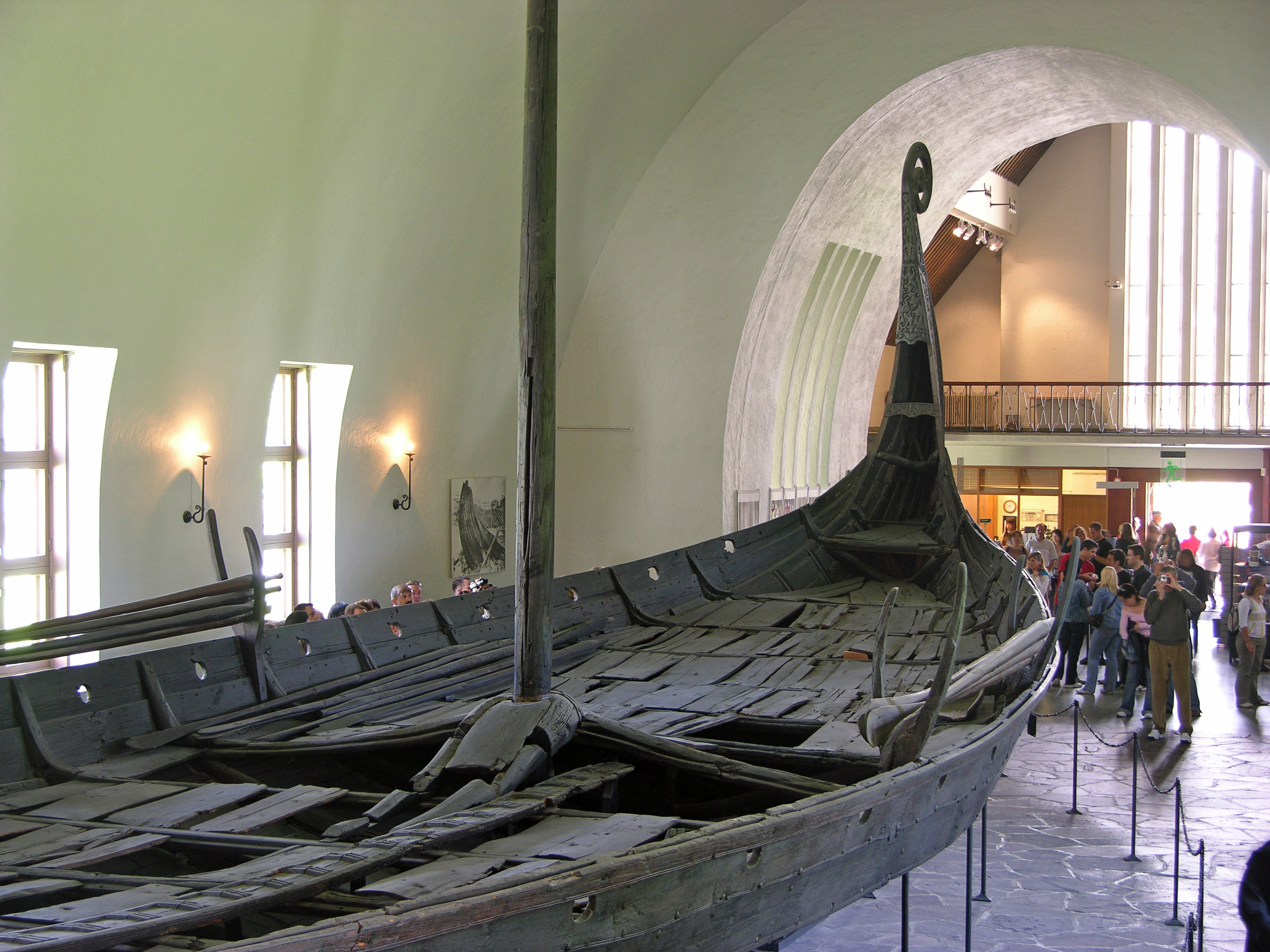
The preserved remains of the Oseberg ship in the Viking Ship Museum in Oslo

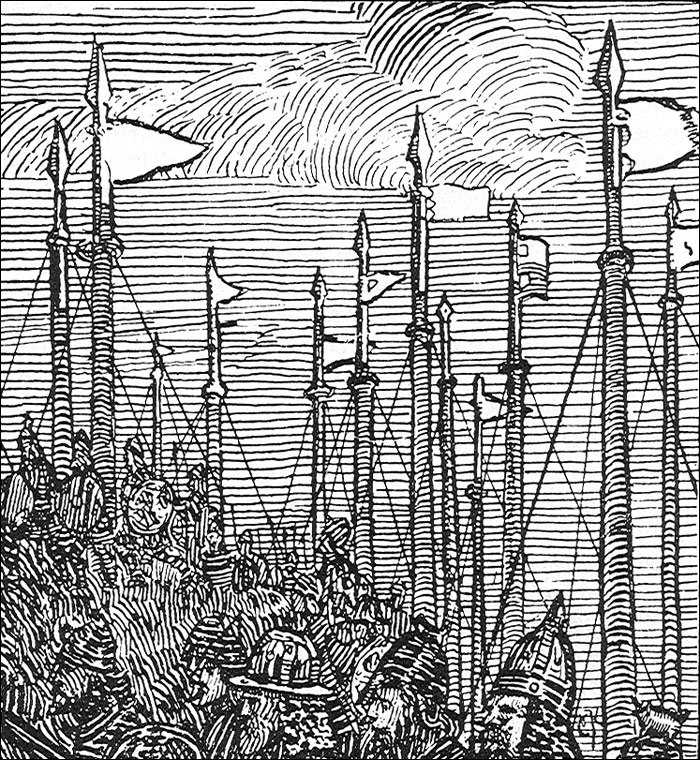
19th-century depiction of Magnus Barefoot's forces in Ireland.

Ruler of the Hebrides and Mann	Period of rule	Title	Notes
Amlaíb Cuarán	c. 941?–980	King of the Isles (and possibly King of Mann)	Amlaíb was later King of Dublin and succeeded Amlaíb mac Gofraid as King of Northumbria in 941 and died on Iona in 981
Maccus mac Arailt	980–?	King of the Isles	Said to have been "brought under subjection" by Edgar the Peaceful, King of England who died in 975
Gofraid mac Arailt	?–989	King of the Isles	Brother of Maccus mac Arailt
Gilli	990–?	Jarl	Operated under Sigurd the Stout, Earl of Orkney & Mormaer of Caithness. Married to Sigurd's sister. Sigurd himself was a vassal of the King of Norway.
Ragnall mac Gofraid	?–1005	King of the Isles	Son of Gofraid mac Arailt
Sigurd the Stout	1005–1014	Earl of Orkney & Mormaer of Caithness	Vassal of the King of Norway
Einar Sigurdsson*?	1014–1016?	Joint Earl of Orkney	Thomson (2008) suggests Einar rangmunnr may have inherited his father's territories in the Hebrides. (Note: Crawford (1987) states that there was a possible "collapse of the earls' control in the west" following the Battle of Clontarf and there is no specific evidence that Einar ever claimed to be a ruler of the Suðreyar. He died c. 1025.)
Håkon Eiriksson*	1016–1030	Ruler of the Suðreyar	Possibly as a vassal of Cnut the Great
Olaf Sigtryggsson*	1030?–1034	King of Mann and many of the other islands of Denmark	Son of Sitric Silkbeard and grandson of Amlaíb Cuarán
Thorfinn the Mighty	c 1035–c 1058 (Note: Thorfinn is often stated as dying c. 1064, although Woolf (2007) states that "there is no reason why a date in the late 1050s is not just as credible.")	Earl of Orkney & Mormaer of Caithness	Vassal of the King of Norway
Ímar mac Arailt*	c 1045?		Ruler of Dublin and possibly Mann. In 1045 Ímar crushed the Ulaid in a raid on Rathlin which may be evidence that he also controlled Mann at this point.
Echmarcach mac Ragnaill*	1052–1061	King of Mann	Probably ruler of both Dublin and Mann prior to 1052, when he was expelled from the former by Diarmait mac Maíl na mBó. Possibly son of Ragnal mac Gofraid and thus possibly a King of Innse Gall as well. (Note: He may have "ruled Dublin and the Isles intermittently until 1061". However, if Echmarcach mac Ragnaill was a son of Ragnal mac Gofraid he must either have been very young when his father died in 1005, or very old on his own death in the early 1060s. He may have controlled Mann from 1036 onwards. There appears to be no evidence of his presence in or around the Scottish islands.)
Murchad mac Diarmata*	1061–1070	King of Dublin and Mann?	
Diarmait mac Maíl na mBó	1070–1072	King of Dublin and the Isles	Father of Murchad, but who ruled after him over Dublin "and, one assumes, Man"
Godred Sitricson	?–1074	King of Man	
Fingal Godredson	1074–?	King of Man	Son of Godred Sitricson
Godred Crovan	1079–1094	King of Dublin and the Isles	Son of "Harald the Black of Ysland"
Possibly Lagmann Godredsson	1095–1098		Eldest son of Godred Crovan. Whether Lagmann began his reign before or after Magnus Barelegs's arrival is not known for certain. (Note: Both possibilities for the timing of Lagmann Godredsson's reign have been advanced by modern scholars. For example, in 1986 Rosemary Power favoured the reigns of Lagmann and Domnall mac Taidc after Magnus's arrival, suggesting that Lagmann may have also ruled for a time under his overlordship. As noted above Duffy (1992) also placed Domnall mac Taidc Ua Briain's rule before Magnus.)

=== Early rulers of Mann ===
Various rulers have been identified as ruling Man, but not the Isles as a whole. The Isle of Man may have fallen under Norse rule in the 870s, and paradoxically they may have brought the Gaelic language with them. The island has produced a more densely distributed Viking Age archaeology than anywhere else in the British Isles, but the written records for this time period are poor.

Rulers of Mann	Period of reign	Titles	Notes
Otir	912?–914?	Jarl and "Master of the Isle of Man"	Possibly as a vassal of Ragnall ua Ímair
Ragnall ua Ímair	914 to 921?	?	Defeated Bárid son of Otir in a naval battle off Man in 914
Gothfrith ua Ímair (Note: He is described as dominating "Dublin, and probably the Isle of Man and much of the coastline of Galloway and north west England.")	pre 927 to?		Father of Amlaíb
Amlaíb mac Gofraid (Note: Woolf (2007) states of Amlaíb mac Gofraid: "It seems likely that he controlled or at least had strong influence in Man and Galloway.")	pre 935 to 941	King of Northumbria and possibly King of the Isles (Note: Amlaíb mac Gofraid was identified by the 12th century chronicler John of Worcester as "King of the Isles".)	After the death of Athelstan in 939, Edmund ceded Northumbria to Amlaíb. Married a daughter of Constantine II.

There then follows a period when it is likely that the Western Isles and Mann were jointly held by rulers of the House of Ímar (see above). Downham (2007) suggests Lagmann Godredson may have "wielded power in Man" and possibly even have been king but was expelled sometime after 1005, perhaps by Brian Bóruma. This may indicate that the Earls of Orkney did not control Man itself in the early 11th century. Echmarcach mac Ragnaill and his successors certainly did control Mann, but the extent of their rule over the islands of the Clyde and the Hebrides is not clear. Óláfr mac Lagmann (or Lagmainn) is recorded as having been killed at Clontarf in 1014, fighting with "warriors from the Hebrides".

Rulers of Mann	Period of rule	Title	Notes
Lagmann mac Gofraid	?–1005	"King of the Swedes"	Possibly a son of Gofraid mac Arailt (Note: Referred to by William of Jumièges as a king of the Swedes, Downham (2007) mentions a theory that "Lagmann ruled the Hebrides and Man in the early eleventh century", discussed further in Downham (2003.) .)
Ottar	d. 1098	Jarl	Earl of "one half of Man"

The period 1095–1098 seems to have been politically unsettled, culminating in a Manx civil war between the north and south of the island. A battle at Santwat between the northerners under Jarl Óttar and the southerners under Macmaras (or MacManus) in 1098 resulted in the deaths of both leaders.

=== Early rulers of the Hebrides ===
In Irish mythology the Outer Hebrides were the home of the Fomorians, described as "huge and ugly" and "ship men of the sea". They were pirates, extracting tribute from the coasts of Ireland and one of their kings was Indech mac Dé Domnand (i.e. Indech, son of the goddess Domnu, who ruled over the deep seas). Indech is also mentioned in the Cath Maige Tuired along with Balor grandson of Nét, his rival who is described as righ na n-Innsi ('king of the Isles'), which may have meant the king of the Inner Hebrides. Together they "gathered all the forces from Lochlainn westwards into Ireland to impose their tribute and their rule over them."

Various later rulers such as Gebeachan are also mentioned in early sources as having a role of some kind over unspecified areas of the northern part of the Kingdom of the Isles.

Rulers of the Hebrides	Date	Title	Notes
Indech mac Dé Domnand	pre 9th century?	King of the Fomoire	
Balor, grandson of Neit	pre 9th century?	King of the Hebrides	
Gebeachan	937	King of the Islands	Died whilst fighting with Amlaíb mac Gofraid at Brunanburh
Conmael mac Gilla Airi	980	Tributary King of the Gall	Fought with Amlaíb Cuarán at Tara

== 12th and 13th centuries ==
=== Kings of Mann and the Isles ===
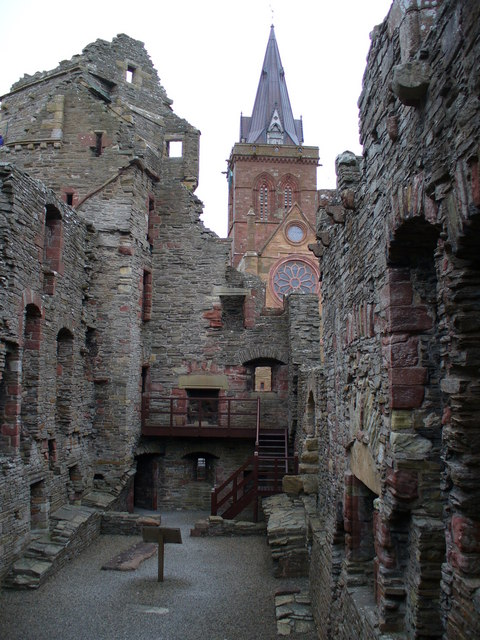
The Bishop's Palace, Kirkwall in Orkney where Haakon Haakonarson, the last Norwegian king to rule over the Sudreyjar died in 1263. The spire of St Magnus Cathedral can be seen in the background.

Ruler of the Hebrides and Mann	Period of reign	Title	Notes
Magnus Barelegs	1098–1102	Possibly King of the Isles	Direct Norwegian rule
Sigurd Magnusson	1102–1103	Direct Norwegian rule	Nominal control by under-age son of Magnus Barelegs
Lagmann Godredsson	1103–1110		Eldest son of Godred Crovan
Domnall mac Taidc Uí Briain	1111–1112	Regent during the minority of Olave the Red	Nephew of Muirchertach Ua Briain. Expelled by the Islesmen.
Olave the Red	1112–1152		Son of Godred Crovan
Godred the Black	1154–1156	King of Man and the Isles	Son of Olave the Red
Somerled's sons & Godred the Black	1156–1158	Rulers of the southern islands and of Mann and the North Isles respectively.	Somerled's sons were Dubgall, Ragnall and Aonghus
Somerled	1158–1164	Lord of Argyll, Kintyre and Lorne	Son-in-law of Olave the Red, and son of GilleBride of the old royal house of Dalriada, and a Norse woman. By 1158 Somerled was Rex Insularum, King of the Isles. His dominion covered 25,000 square miles and more than 500 islands.

Godred the Black's dictatorial style appears to have made him very unpopular with the Islesmen, and the powerful barons of the isles began plotting with an emerging and forceful figure – Somerled, Lord of Argyll. When Godred heard of this he engaged Somerled's forces in the naval Battle of Epiphany in 1156. There was no clear victor, but it was subsequently agreed that Godred would remain the ruler of Man and the northern Hebrides, whilst Somerled's young sons would nominally control the southern Inner Hebrides, Kintyre and the islands of the Clyde under their father's supervision. Two years later Somerled's invasion of the Isle of Man caused Godred to flee to Norway, leaving the former as the undisputed ruler of the entire realm.

Following the death of Somerled in 1164 Godred re-took possession of his pre-1158 territories in Mann and the north and the southern isles were distributed amongst Somerled's sons as had been previously agreed: Dubgall received Mull, Coll, Tiree and Jura; Islay and Kintyre went to Ragnall; Bute to Aonghas, with Arran possibly divided between him and Reginald. The Chronicle of Man and the Sudreys lamented that Somerled's marriage to Ragnhildis, daughter of Olave the Red, had been "the cause of the ruin of the whole kingdom of the Isles".

=== Kings of Mann and the North Isles ===
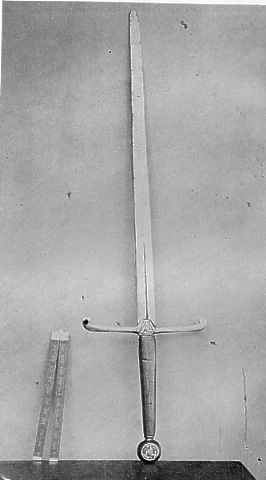
The Manx Sword of State is popularly attributed to Olaf the Black, although modern research dates it to a much later period.

Kings of Mann	Norse name	Gaelic name	Period of reign	Title	Notes
Reginald	Unknown	Unknown	1164	No record	Half-brother of Godred the Black
Godred the Black	Guðrøðr Óláfsson	Gofraid mac Amlaíb	1164–1187	King of the Isles	Re-instated
Ragnvald	Rögnvaldr Guðrøðarson	Raghnall mac Gofraidh	1188–1226	King of the Isles	Son of Godred the Black
Olaf the Black	Óláfr Guðrøðarson	Amlaíb mac Gofraid	1226–1237	King of Mann and the Isles	Half-brother of Raghnall mac Gofraidh
Óspakr-Hákon		Gille Escoib mac Dubgaill	1230	King of the Suðreyjar	Son of Dubgall mac Somairle?
Gofraid Donn	Guðrøðr Rögnvaldsson	Gofraid mac Ragnaill	1230		Son of Raghnall mac Gofraidh
Harald Olafsson	Haraldr Óláfsson	Aralt mac Amlaíb Duib	1237–1248?	King of Mann and the Isles	Son of Olaf the Black
Ragnvald Olafsson	Rögnvaldr Óláfsson	Ragnall mac Amlaíb	1249	King of Mann and the Isles	Son of Olaf the Black, his rule was brief
Harald Godredsson	Haraldr Guðrøðarson	Aralt mac Gofraid Donn	1249–1250	King of Mann	Son of Gofraid Donn and grandson of Raghnall mac Gofraidh
Magnus Olafsson	Magnus Óláfsson	Mágnus mac Amlaib	1252–1265?	King of Mann and the Isles	Son of Olaf the Black

In a precursor to 1263, Norwegian forces invaded in 1230 in response to dynastic struggles amongst Godred the Black's descendants. The Chronicle of Lanercost states that a Norwegian fleet sailed down the west coast of Scotland with Óspakr-Hákon, who had been appointed "King of the Suðreyjar" by the King of Norway (and who may have been a son of Dubgall mac Somairle). His forces took Rothesay Castle, hacking through the walls with their axes. The Eirspennill version of Hákonar saga Hákonarsonar states that the fleet then sailed to Kintyre where Óspakr-Hákon fell ill and died. Olaf the Black then took control of the fleet, and led it to the Isle of Man. He and Gofraid Donn, the son of Raghnall mac Gofraidh, divided the kingdom between themselves, with the latter retaining Mann, and the former controlling the northern islands. A short time later Gofraid Donn was slain, possibly on Lewis.

On 30 May 1249, Ragnvald Olafsson was slain in a meadow near the Church of the Holy Trinity at Rushen by a knight named Ívarr, along with several of the knight's followers. The Chronicle of Lanercost states that he had reigned for only 27 days. Harald Godredsson then seized the kingship, although he was summoned to Norway the following year and effectively dispossessed. Magnus Olafsson was the last of the Norse kings to rule Mann, which was absorbed into the Kingdom of Scotland on his death.

=== Kings of the South Isles ===
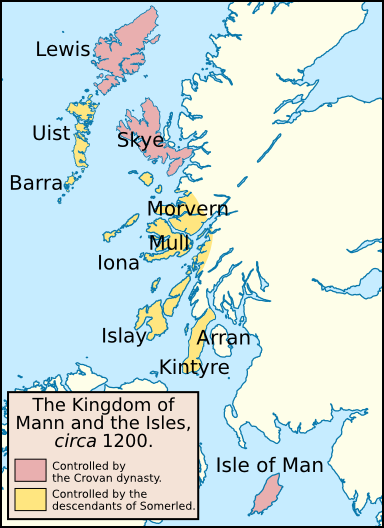
The Suðreyjar in about 1200: the lands of the Crovan dynasty and the descendants of Somerled.

Rulers of the Hebrides	Gaelic name	Period of reign	Title	Notes
Dugald	Dubgall mac Somairle	1164–c1175	King of the Isles	Son of Somerled
Ranald	Ragnall mac Somairle	1164–1207	King of the Isles	Son of Somerled
Duncan	Donnchadh mac Dubgaill	? – c. 1244?	King of the Sudreys	Son of Dubgall mac Somairle
Dugald Screech	Dubgall mac Dubgaill	?	King of the Sudreys	Son of Dubgall mac Somairle
Somerled	Somairle mac Dubgaill	? – 1230	King of the Sudreys	Probably a son of Dubgall mac Somairle
Ruari	Ruaidhri mac Raghnaill	1207?–1247?	King of the Isles	Son of Ragnall mac Somairle
Ewen of Argyll	Eóghan	1248–1263	King of the Sudreys	Son of Donnchadh mac Dubhghaill
Dugald MacRuairi	Dubhghall mac Ruaidhri	1249–1266?	King of the Sudreys	Son of Ruaidhri mac Raghnaill

The 1780 Anecdotes of Olave the Black (which are based on Hákonar saga Hákonarsonar) state that there were 3 Sudreyan kings all existing at one time who were "of the family of Somerled" and who were "very untrue to King Haco". It is not entirely clear which three kings are being referred to. They include Dubgall "Screech" mac Dubgaill and his brother Donnchadh and either Eóghan of Argyll who "was king afterwards" or possibly an unknown "relation of theirs, called Somerled, [who] was then also a King in the Sudreys". This Somerled, who died in 1230, may have been a brother or cousin of Dubgall and Donnchadh.

Ragnall mac Somairle's son, Ruaidhri mac Raghnaill may have been the "king of the Isles" who was recorded in the Irish chronicles as having been killed fighting against the English at the Battle of Ballyshannon in 1247. Ruaidhri's direct descendants Dubhghall and Ailean, who ruled Garmoran and the Uists are generally not given titles by Scottish sources. However the Icelandic Annals recorded for the year 1249 that: "Dubhghall took kingship in the Sudreys." Norse sources also refer to kingship being held by Eóghan of Argyll, although this was rescinded by King Haakon when he refused to participate in the latter's expeditions against Scotland.

== See also ==
- List of Manx monarchs
- List of Manx consorts
- Lists of monarchs in the British Isles
- Lord of the Isles
