= Óspakr-Hákon =

Óspakr
- King of the Isles
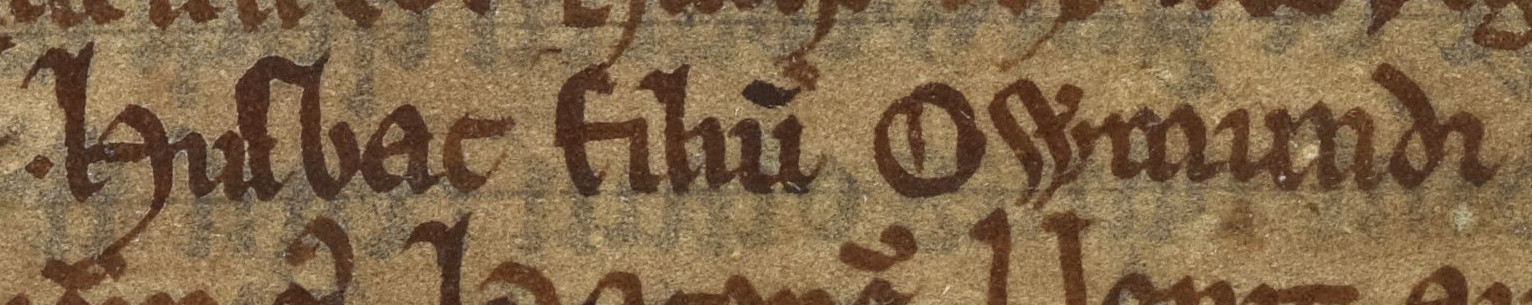
- Óspakr's name as it appears on folio 44v of British Library Cotton Julius A VII (the Chronicle of Mann): "Husbac filium Owmundi".
- Died: 1230 southern Hebrides
- Burial: Iona
- House: possibly the Meic Dubgaill dynasty
- Father: possibly Dubgall mac Somairle

Óspakr (died 1230), also known as Hákon, was a King of the Isles. (Note: Since the 1990s, academics have accorded Óspakr various personal names in English secondary sources: Gilla Esbuig mac Dubgaill, Gilleasbuig mac Dubgaill mac Somairle, Gilleasbuig mac Dubgaill, Gilleasbuig mac Dubhgaill, Gilleasbuig MacDougall, Gillespec MacDougall, Hákon, Hakon, Ospak Asmundsson, Óspakr-Hákon, Óspak, Óspakr, Uspak Hákon, Uspak Håkon, Uspak Hakon, Uspak Mac Dubhghaill, Uspak Ogmondsson, Uspak-Hákon, Uspak-Håkon, Uspak, and Uspak/Hakon.) He seems to have been a son of Dubgall mac Somairle, King of the Isles, and therefore a member of the Meic Dubgaill branch of the Meic Somairle kindred. Óspakr spent a considerable portion of his career in the Kingdom of Norway as a member of the Birkibeinar faction in the Civil war era in Norway. He seems to be identical to Óspakr suðreyski, a Birkibeinar who took part in the plundering of Hebrides and the sacking of Iona in 1209/1210. The context of this expedition is uncertain, although it may have been envisioned as a way of reasserting Norwegian royal authority into the Kingdom of the Isles.

In the decade following the ravaging of Iona, the Kingdom of the Isles was plagued by vicious conflict between two competing dynasts of the Crovan dynasty. Although one member of this kindred, Óláfr Guðrøðarson, King of the Isles, overcame his main dynastic rival in 1229, he faced continued opposition from Alan fitz Roland, Lord of Galloway, and leading members of the Meic Somairle. As a consequence of this conflict, Óláfr fled to Norway in 1230, and Hákon Hákonarson, King of Norway authorised the preparation of a military campaign to restore order. The title of king was thereupon conferred upon Óspakr, as was the royal name Hákon, with Óspakr receiving command of a fleet take with him into the Isles. By May or June of that year, Óspakr's fleet reached the heart of the Hebrides where it is recorded to have swollen to eighty ships. The full brunt of Óspakr's forces were directed at Bute, where a stronghold—almost certainly Rothesay Castle—is reported to have fallen within a few days. Reports of a nearby fleet under Alan's command forced the Norwegians to withdraw from Bute, and Óspakr is reported to have died, apparently from injuries sustained during the sack of Bute. After Óspakr's death, the Norwegian enterprise was led by Óláfr who established himself on Mann. The following spring, with the Kingdom of the Isles partitioned between Óláfr and his rival nephew, Guðrøðr Rǫgnvaldsson, the Norwegians set sail for home, where Hákon thanked the returning warriors. About thirty years later, a certain Ruðri is recorded to have claimed Bute as his birthright and to have assisted Hákon in another Norwegian campaign in the Isles. One possibility is that Ruðri was a descendant of Óspakr.

== Familial background ==
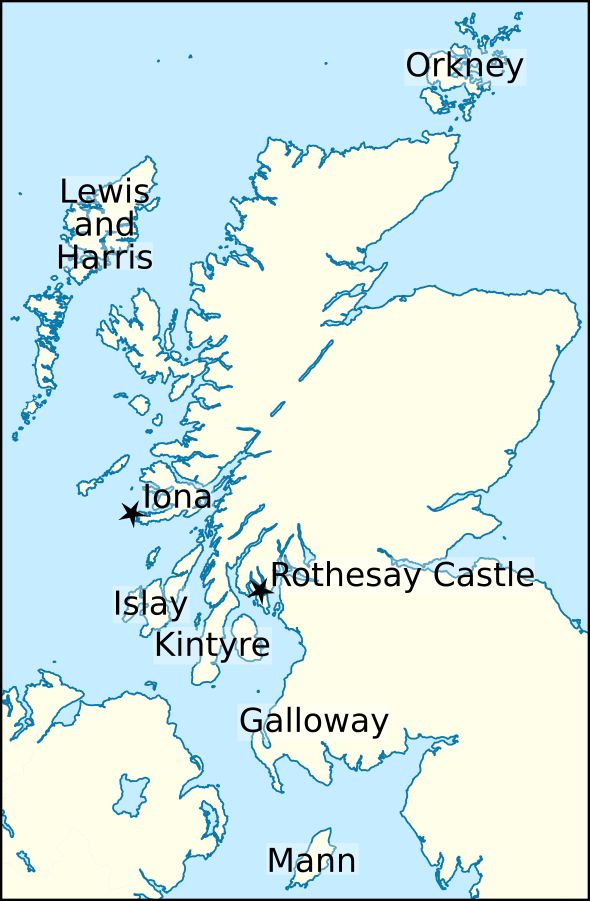
Locations relating to Óspakr's life and times.

Óspakr seems to have been a member of the Meic Dubgaill branch of the Meic Somairle kindred. Specifically, Óspakr appears to have been a son of Dubgall mac Somairle, King of the Isles, ancestor of the Meic Dubgaill. The latter figure was a son of Somairle mac Gilla Brigte, King of the Isles, the common ancestor of the Meic Somairle. Óspakr's name—although Scandinavian—is not evidence against a familial connection with the Meic Somairle, as Somairle himself bore a Gaelicised form of a Scandinavian name. Nevertheless, there is also a possibility that Óspakr's name is a Scandinavianised form of the Gaelic Gilla Esbuig. (Note: An association between this Gaelic name and the Old Norse Óspakr can be explained in two ways. On one hand, the names may be completely unrelated, with the Gaelic name merely substituted with Óspakr on account of its similar sound. On the other hand, Óspakr—generally thought to mean "unruly"—may actually be derived from the Gaelic name.) Although the patronym—"Husbac filium Owmundi"—accorded to Óspakr by the thirteenth- to fourteenth-century Chronicle of Mann ostensibly identifies his father as a man named Ǫgmundr, the thirteenth-century Hákonar saga Hákonarsonar instead identifies Óspakr as a son of Dubgall mac Somairle. If the latter source is indeed correct, one possibility is that the patronym recorded by the Chronicle of Mann refers to a foster father rather than a biological father. On the other hand, there is reason to suspect that Óspakr's patronym indeed refers to a biological ancestor. For example, the patronym accorded to Somairle by the fifteenth- to sixteenth-century Annals of Ulster—"Somharlidh Mac Gille Adhamhnain"—refers Somairle's grandfather, Gilla Adamnáin, instead of Somairle's father, Gilla Brigte. The fact that Somairle is accorded a patronym referring to his lineage rather than his parentage could indicate that Óspakr's patronym is a Scandinavianised form of the same lineage name.

== Plunderer of Iona ==
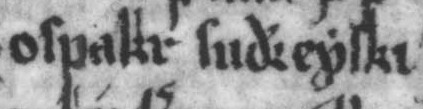
Óspakr suðreyski's name as it appears on folio 138v of AM 47 fol (Eirspennill): "Ospakr suðreyski". Óspakr suðreyski's epithet, suðreyski, translates to "the Hebridean".

Óspakr seems to be identical to Óspakr suðreyski, a like-named member of an invading Norwegian force that plundered Iona in 1210. According to the Icelandic annals, a military expedition from Norway into the Isles had been under preparation in 1209. The following year, this source makes note of "warfare" in the Isles, and reveals that Iona was pillaged. These reports are corroborated by the thirteenth-century Bǫglunga sǫgur, a saga-collection that survives in two versions. Both versions reveal that a fleet of Norwegians plundered in the Isles, and the shorter version notes how men of the Birkibeinar and the Baglar—two competing sides of the Norwegian civil war—decided to recoup their financial losses with a twelve-ship raiding expedition into the Isles. This particular version of the saga names Óspakr suðreyski as one of the three Birkibeinar leaders of the expedition.

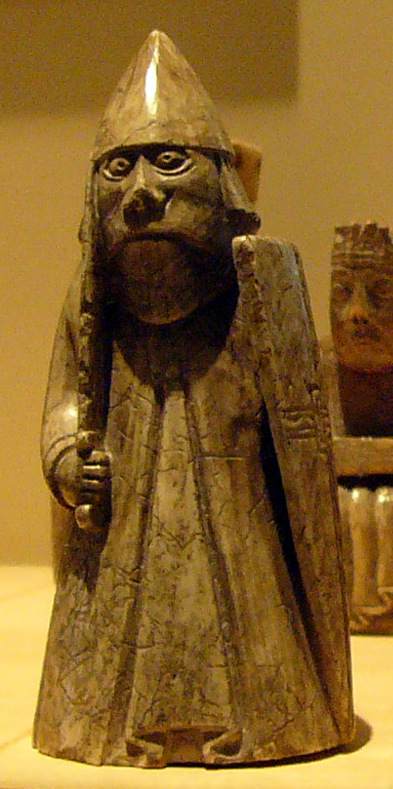
A rook gaming piece of the so-called Lewis chessmen. The Scandinavian connections of leading members of the Isles may have been reflected in their military armament, and could have resembled that depicted upon such gaming pieces.

One possibility is that this operation was organised in the context of the Norwegian Crown reasserting royal authority in the Isles. For example, the longer version of the saga relates that a fleet of Norwegians made landfall in Shetland and Orkney, whereupon Bjarni Kolbeinsson, Bishop of Orkney, and the two co-earls of Orkney—Jón Haraldsson and Davið Haraldsson—were compelled to journey to Norway and submit to Ingi Bárðarson, King of Norway, rendering him hostages and a large fine. The same source further reveals that as a consequence of the Norwegian plundering in the Isles, two members of the ruling Crovan dynasty—Rǫgnvaldr Guðrøðarson, King of the Isles and his son Guðrøðr—also travelled to Norway, where they swore obedience to Ingi, paid him a tax, and took their lands from him as a lén (fief). The submission of the Islesmen seems to have been undertaken at about the time of a reawakening of Norwegian royal authority following the settlement between the opposing Birkibeinar and Baglar factions. There is reason to suspect that the destructive Norwegian activity in the Isles may have been some sort of officially sanctioned punishment in response to not only Rǫgnvaldr's recalcitrance of his Norwegian obligations, but his recent reorientation towards the English Crown. In any case, the fact that Ingi turned his attention to the Isles so soon after peace was brokered between the Birkibeinar and Baglar may well indicate the importance he placed on his relations with his contemporaries in the Isles.

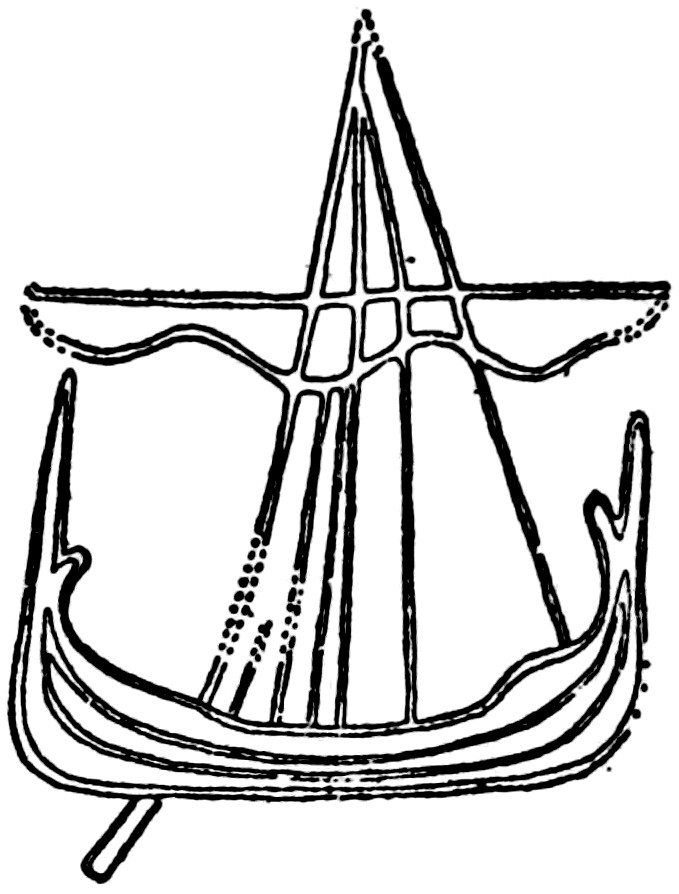
Detail from Maughold IV, a Manx runestone displaying a contemporary sailing vessel. The power of the kings of the Isles laid in their armed galley-fleets.

Within the same year of the attack, the Icelandic annals state that a certain Koli was consecrated Bishop of the Isles. This record could reveal that Koli's consecration was somehow related to the Norwegian expedition of 1209/1210, and that—just as the Orcadian earls were accompanied to Norway by their bishop—Rǫgnvaldr and Guðrøðr may have been accompanied by Koli. The Norwegian undertaking, therefore, may have been designed to reassert Norwegian overlordship over both secular and ecclesiastical authorities in Norwegian satellites overseas. If correct, the voyage would seem to have been orchestrated by both Ingi and his chief prelate, Þórir Guðmundarson, Archbishop of Niðaróss. Although the leadership of the Meic Somairle had controversially refounded Iona at the turn of the century, and had further secured its independence from the Diocese of the Isles by placing it under the protection of the papacy, the Norwegian sack of the island may not have been a sanctioned act. One possibility is that a visit to the island by the Norwegian delegation disastrously deteriorated into otherwise unplanned violence.

== King of the Isles ==
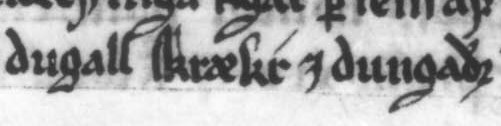
The names of Dubgall and Donnchad, sons of Dubgall mac Somairle and possible brothers of Óspakr, as they appear on folio 162v of AM 47 fol (Eirspennill): "Dugall skrækr ok Dungaðr". The epithet attributed to Dubgall in this excerpt, skrækr, translates to "screech". (Note: This Scandinavian epithet, borne by a man with a Gaelic name, exemplifies the hybrid culture of the Kingdom of the Isles.)

In the decades following the ravaging of Iona, the Kingdom of the Isles was plagued by vicious conflict between two competing dynasts of the Crovan dynasty: namely Rǫgnvaldr and his younger half-brother, Óláfr Guðrøðarson. Although Rǫgnvaldr enlisted the support of Alan fitz Roland, Lord of Galloway by way of a marital alliance, Óláfr seized the kingship of the Isles in 1226 and slew Rǫgnvaldr three years later. The death of Alan's ally did not deter Gallovidian interests in the Isles. In fact, it is apparent that Alan and members of the Meic Somairle—Dubgall and Donnchad, both sons of Dubgall mac Somairle—upheld pressure upon the recently inaugurated Óláfr. According to Hákonar saga Hákonarsonar, reports of open warfare in the Isles reached the royal court of Hákon Hákonarson, King of Norway in the summer of 1229. Specifically, the saga singles out Alan as one of the principal perpetrators of unrest in the Isles, describing him as "the greatest warrior", possessing a large force of men and ships with which he plundered throughout the Hebrides. The two sons of Dubgall mac Somairle are also noted, as is a kinsman of theirs named Somairle. All three of these Meic Somairle kinsmen are styled kings by Hákonar saga Hákonarsonar, which describes the men as "unfaithful" to the Norwegian Crown. The saga also identifies Óspakr as yet another son of Dubgall mac Somairle, albeit one who had long served outside the Isles as a Birkibeinar. Although Óláfr arrived at the Norwegian court early in 1230, having been forced from the Isles by Alan and his allies, it is evident that Hákon had already decided upon a course of action.

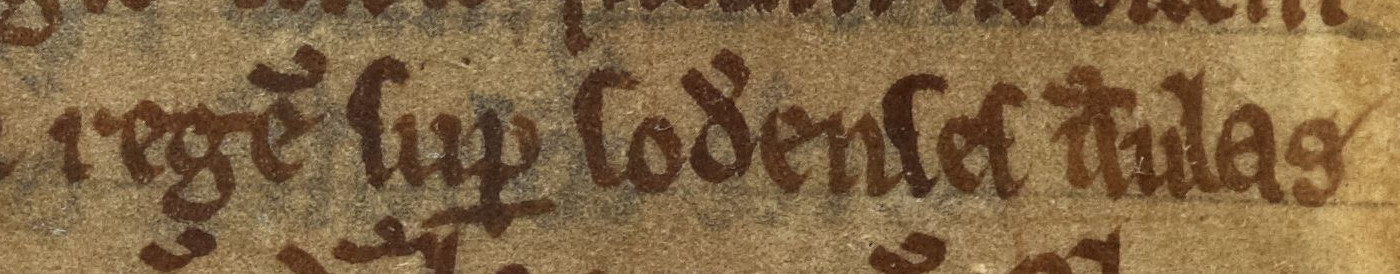
Óspakr's title as it appears on 44v of British Library Cotton Julius A VII: "regem super Soderenses" ("king over the Sodor Islands").

The Icelandic annals, the Chronicle of Mann, the fourteenth-century Chronicle of Lanercost, and Hákonar saga Hákonarsonar, all reveal that Hákon handed over the kingship of the Isles to Óspakr and bestowed upon him the royal name Hákon. According to the latter source, Hákon not only granted him the kingship, but also gave him command of the Norwegian fleet tasked with restoring peace in the Isles. Within days of Óláfr's arrival in Norway, the saga reveals that Óspakr's fleet set sail for the Isles, and swelled in number after reaching Orkney. Whilst the Eirspennill version of the saga numbers the fleet in Norway at twelve ships, the Flateyjarbók, Frísbók, and Skálholtsbók versions give the number eleven; and whilst the former version relates that the fleet gained twenty ships from Orkney, the latter three versions state that the fleet numbered twenty when it left Orkney. (Note: Hákonar saga Hákonarsonar exists in several mediaevel redactions. The most authoritative of these is the Eirspennill version. Whilst the fleet was Orkney, the saga reports that a detachment of ships, led by a certain Bálki Pálsson and Óttarr Snækollr, journeyed to Skye where they fought and killed Þórkell Þórmóðarson, in what may have been the culmination of a family feud. If word of Óspakr's royal fleet had not reached Alan and the Scots at the time of its arrival at Orkney, news of it could well have been passed on from Ferchar mac an tSacairt, Earl of Ross—an associate of Bálki's father Páll Bálkason—when the Islesmen clashed at Skye.) Once in the Isles, the fleet linked up with the three other members of the Meic Somairle on Islay. According to the saga, the Meic Somairle held a feast for the Norwegians. That night, whilst Donnchad slept on board with Óspakr, the Norwegians are stated to have attacked Dubgall and Somairle, killing the latter amongst many others. Once Óspakr became aware of the attack, the source states that he allowed Donnchad to escape, and took Dubgall under his protection. One possibility is that Donnchad's escape was enabled as an attempt to retain the Meic Dubgaill's dual allegiance to the Norwegian and Scottish Crowns. Another possibility is that Óspakr's Meic Somairle kinsmen were suspected of attempting to sabotage the operation. Certainly, Donnchad's later career reveals him to have ingratiated himself to the Scottish cause.

The name of Somairle, possibly Óspakr's brother, as it appears on folio 163r of AM 47 fol: "Sumarliði".

There are two conspicuous Meic Somairle absentees from Óspakr's campaign. One such man was Ruaidrí mac Ragnaill, who seems to have been driven from Kintyre by Alexander II, King of Scotland in the 1220s. One explanation for Ruaidrí's nonappearance may be his possible participation in the near-concurrent insurrection of the Meic Uilleim claimants to the Scottish throne. (Note: The last uprising of the Meic Uilleim was crushed by the Scottish Crown in 1229, and the last member of the family—an infant girl—was brutally executed in 1230.) Ruaidrí's younger brother, Domnall, is likewise unattested, although this may have been due to the fact that he seems to have come to an accommodation with the Scottish king in the wake of Ruaidrí's expulsion, and to have owed his lordship in Kintyre to Alexander's good will. If correct, the Norwegian muster off Islay, and the ravaging of surrounding territories, may be indicative of an attempt by Óspakr to overawe Domnall.

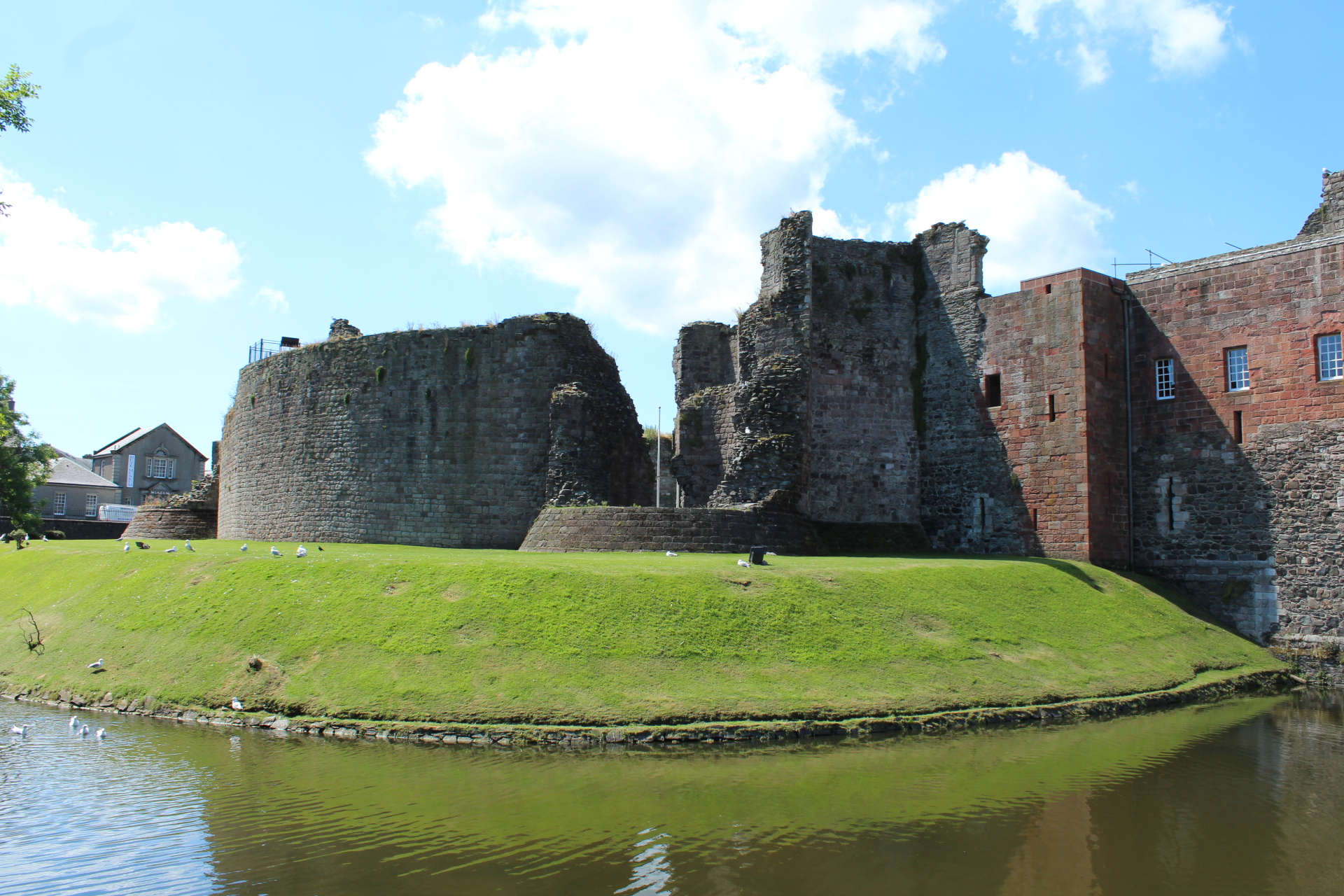
Ruinous Rothesay Castle. According to saga accounts, Óspakr's forces attacked the castle's soft stone walls, whilst the Scots poured boiling pitch down upon them. Later in the century, the castle appears to have undergone considerable reconstructional enhancement.

News of the gathering Norwegian fleet soon reached Alexander II, who appears to have made straight for the western coast, diverting his attention to the now rapidly developing crisis. On 28 May, Alan is recorded in Alexander II's presence at Ayr, where the Scottish royal forces appear to have assembled. It was probably May or June when Óspakr's fleet rounded the Mull of Kintyre, entered the Firth of Clyde, and made landfall on Bute, where his forces successfully stormed and captured a fortress that is almost certainly identical to Rothesay Castle. The Flateyjarbók, Frísbók, and Skálholtsbók versions of the saga specify that the castle fell after three days of battle, and that three hundred Norwegians and Islesmen fell in the assault. (Note: The fortress seems to have been built by either Alan fitz Walter, Steward of Scotland or his succeeding son, Walter fitz Alan II, Steward of Scotland. The castle first appears on record in sources reporting its fall in the attack. Although nominally under Norwegian sovereignty, the island seems to have fallen into the hands of the family of the Stewards of Scotland sometime between the last decades of the twelfth century and the first decades of the thirteenth century. Later known as the Stewarts, this kindred may well have capitalised upon the interdynastic strife suffered by the Meic Somairle during this span of years. Alan's grant of the kirk of Kingarth and its surrounding lands on Bute to the monastery of Paisley, in 1177×1204, may have been forced upon him by the reigning William I, King of Scotland in light of Alan's acquisition of territories outside Scotland's territorial boundaries.) By this stage in the campaign, the fleet is stated to have reached a size of eighty ships, a tally which may indicate that Óspakr's fighting force numbered over three thousand men. The castle itself was a holding of Walter fitz Alan II, Steward of Scotland, and the attack upon this stronghold seems to evince the anxiety felt by the Meic Somairle in the face of the steward's steadily increasing regional influence. The sacking of Bute, the most important island-holding of one of the most powerful Scottish magnates, seems to have spurned the Scots into action. Reports that Alan was in the vicinity, at the command of a massive fleet, is stated to have forced the Norwegians to withdraw to Kintyre. Whilst the Eirspennill version of the saga numbers Alan's fleet at almost two hundred ships, the Flateyjarbók, Frísbók, and Skálholtsbók versions give a tally of one hundred and fifty. These totals suggest that Alan commanded a force of two thousand or three thousand men.

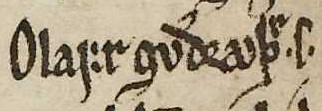
The name of Óláfr Guðrøðarson, the man who succeeded Óspakr in command of the Norwegian campaign, as it appears on folio 102v of AM 45 fol (Codex Frisianus): "Olafr Gvðraþarson".

After the withdrawal of the fleet to Kintyre, the saga reports that Óspakr took ill and died. Óspakr seems to have succumbed to injuries sustained from the assault on Bute, as the Chronicle of Lanercost, and the Chronicle of Mann state that he was struck down by a stone, with the later source recording his burial on Iona. Either way, the saga reveals that Óspakr's fall was bitterly lamented amongst his followers. Command of the fleet was thereafter assumed by Óláfr, who successfully eluded Alan's forces, and diverted the fleet to Mann to suit his own needs. Although Óláfr was reinstated as king, he was forced to partition the realm with Guðrøðr, who took kingship in the Hebrides. The latter was evidently in Norway before Óláfr's arrival, and may have been one of Óspakr's principal supporters. One possibility is that Hákon originally intended for Óspakr and Guðrøðr to divide the kingdom at Óláfr's expense. Another possibility is that Hákon originally ordered a division of power between Óláfr and Guðrøðr Dond, and that Hákon originally promised to lend support to Óláfr's cause on the condition of a concession of authority to Guðrøðr, who—like Óspakr—could have been recognised as king by the Norwegian Crown. In any case, the Norwegian forces left Mann for home in the following spring, and established Guðrøðr in the Hebrides. Before the end of 1231, the latter was slain under uncertain circumstances, and Óláfr regained control of the entire kingdom. Upon the homeward return of the Norwegians, Hákonar saga Hákonarsonar declares that Hákon's "honours had been won" as a result of the expedition, and that he heartily thanked the men for their service.

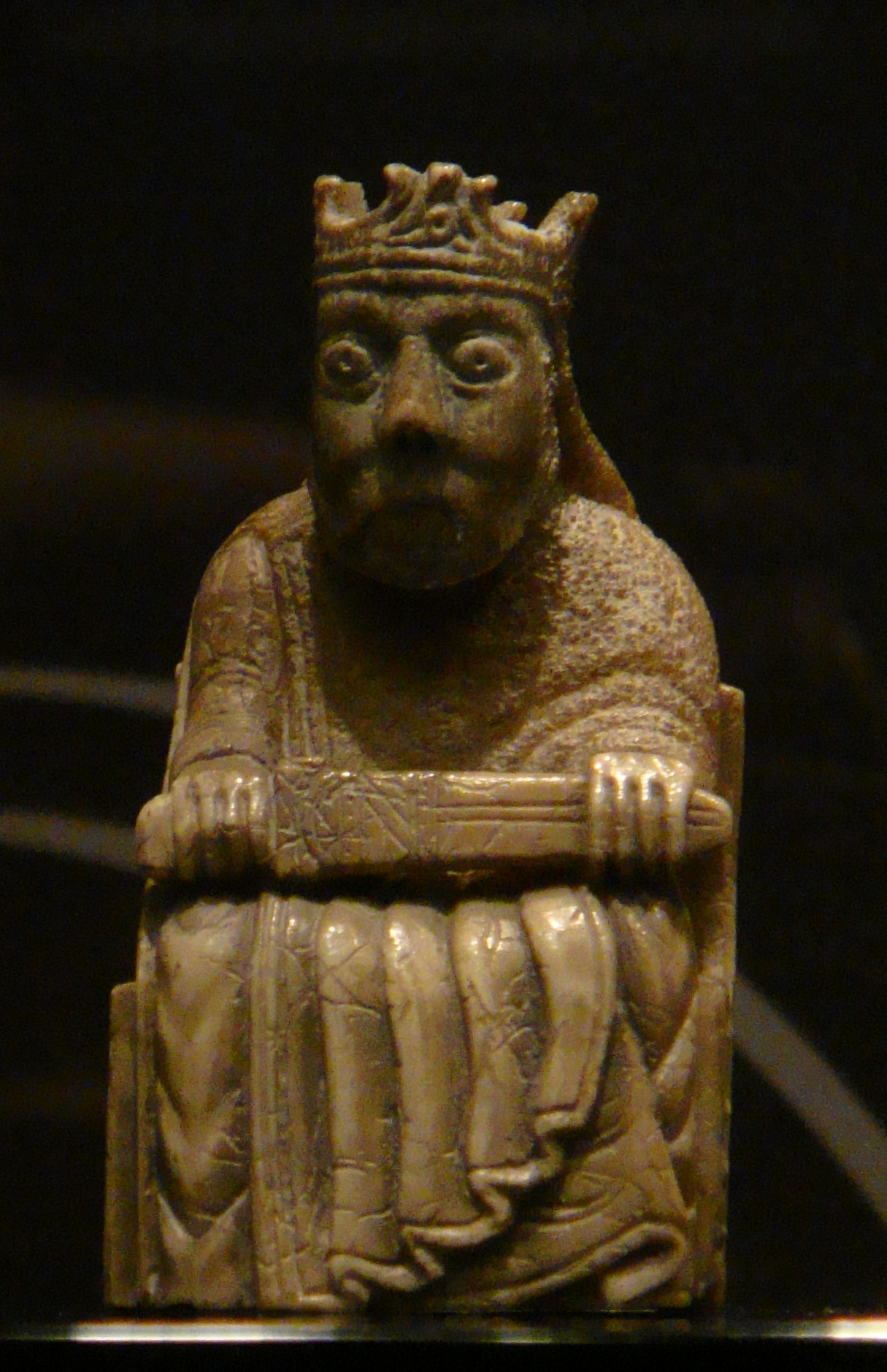
A king gaming piece of the so-called Lewis chessmen.

Despite Óspakr's elevation as king, it is uncertain how Hákon envisioned the governance of the Kingdom of the Isles. On one hand, it is possible that Hákon intended for Óspakr and Guðrøðr to divide the kingdom at Óláfr's expense. On the other hand, the fact that Óláfr's struggle against Alan and Meic Somairle is acclaimed by the saga could indicate that Hákon did not intend to replace Óláfr with Óspakr. Instead, Hákon may have planned for Óspakr to reign over the sprawling domain of Meic Somairle as a way to ensure the kindred's obedience. Óspakr's prospective realm, therefore, seems to have comprised Argyll, Kintyre, and the Inner Hebrides. If correct, the fleet's primary design would appear to have been the procurement of Óspakr's domain, whilst a secondary objective—adopted very late in the campaign—seems to have been the restoration of Óláfr on Mann. In consequence, Ruaidrí's nonappearance in the operation may have been due to resentment of Óspakr's prospective overlordship. Although Scottish sources fail to note the Norwegian campaign, its magnitude is revealed by English sources such as the thirteenth-century Annales de Dunstaplia and the Chronicle of Lanercost, with the former reporting that the campaigning Norwegians and Islesmen were only overcome with much labour after they had invaded Scotland and Mann and inflicted considerable casualties.

== Possible descendants ==
The name of Ruðri, a possible descendant of Óspakr, as it appears on folio 122v of AM 45 fol: "Rvðri".

In 1263, over thirty years after Óspakr's fateful campaign, Scottish aggression into the Isles precipitated yet another Norwegian expedition, this time led by Hákon himself. According to Hákonar saga Hákonarsonar, when Hákon reached the southernmost Hebrides, a ship-commander named Ruðri swore allegiance to Hákon with his two brothers. Ruðri is recorded to have claimed Bute as his birthright, stating that he had been outlawed by the Scottish Crown for attempting to take back what was rightfully his. After Hákon's forces ravaged the island and captured Rothesay Castle, Ruðri is recorded to have slaughtered the Scottish prisoners and to have devastated the Scottish mainland far and wide.

Óspakr's name and title as it appears on folio 163v of AM 47 fol: "Uspakr konungr".

With the conclusion of the campaign, the saga reports that Hákon rewarded some of his Hebridean vassals, and that he granted Bute to Ruðri. Although Ruðri's exact identity is unknown, he could well have been a member of the Meic Somairle. One possibility is that he was a son or grandson of Óspakr. Another is that he was a descendant of Ruaidrí. If Óspakr was indeed a forebear of Ruðri, the latter's actions on Bute may relate to the campaign of 1230, and may have been undertaken in the context of settling old scores. The castle itself—and the surrounding settlement of Rothesay—may owe its name to Ruðri, or perhaps to an ancestor of his. As for Óspakr's brothers Dubgall and Donnchad, nothing further is known of the former, whilst the latter went on to represent the Meic Dubgaill into the middle part of the thirteenth century. The latter was a significant mainland magnate within the Scottish realm, and the fact that he is not recorded to have contributed to Óspakr's campaign after his release could be indicative of an attempt to accommodate the Meic Dubgaill's conflicting allegiances to both the Norwegian and Scottish Crowns.
