= Mac Ospaic =

Irish family name

- Mac Ospaic in a Gaelic type.
- Gender: Masculine
- Language: Irish

Other gender
- Feminine: Nic Ospaic, Bean Mhic Ospaic, Mhic Ospaic

Origin
- Language: Irish
- Meaning: "son of Ospac"

Mac Ospaic is a masculine surname in the Irish language. The name translates into English as "son of Ospac". The surname originated as a patronym, however it no longer refers to the actual name of the bearer's father. There are specific forms of the surname that are borne by married and unmarried females. There is at least one Anglicised form of the surname.

== Etymology ==
Mac Ospaic translates into English as "son of Ospac". The surname originated as a patronym, however it no longer refers to the actual name of the bearer's father. The name Ospac is a Gaelic derivative of the Old Norse personal name Óspakr.

== Feminine forms ==
Mac Ospaic is a masculine surname. The form of this surname for unmarried females is Nic Ospaic; this name translates into English as "daughter of the son of Ospac. The form of this surname for married females is Bean Mhic Ospaic, or simply Mhic Ospaic; these surnames translate to "wife of the son of Ospac.

== Anglicised form ==
The surname has historically been Anglicised as MacCosbey.
