= Scottish expedition into Argyll (1221–1222) =

Scottish military campaign

Date	1221-1222
Location	Argyll
Result	Argyll joined with Scotland

Belligerents
Kingdom of Scotland	Clann Somhairle

Commanders and leaders
Alexander II	Ruaidhrí mac Raghnaill; Donnchadh of Argyll

The Scottish expedition into Argyll (1221–1222) was a Scottish expedition into Argyll and the surrounding region. The expedition led by King Alexander II of Scotland, appears to have been undertaken to counter the threat of Clann Somhairle and alliances created between the Crovan dynasty of the Isle of Man and Ailean mac Lachlainn, Lord of Galloway and Constable of Scotland and old alliances with the Meic Uilleim and MacHeths. The sub kingdom of Argyll was brought into the Kingdom of Scotland, after expelling Ruaidhrí mac Raghnaill from the area and the submission and swearing of fealty given by Donnchadh of Argyll. Alexander II set about formalising Norman feudal law and Scottish administration of the area and ordered the building of royal castles at Dunoon, Cowal and Tarbet, Kintyre.

== Expedition ==
Shortly after Alexander II's wedding to Joan of England, the sister of King Henry III of England that took place on 21 June 1221, at York Minster in England, Alexander II left for the expedition into Argyll.

The Scottish army was gathered from Lothian, Galloway and other provinces and sailed against the men of Argyll from Renfrew. The fleet was driven back by storms and the expedition was held off until the following summer. Renewed in June 1222, Alexander II received hostages from those lords who submitted and swore fealty to him. Those lords who failed to recognise Alexander II as their feudal overlord, or fled, were banished and their lands redistributed amongst his followers. Argyll, Cowal, Knapdale and Kintyre were subjugated.

Alexander II ordered the building of royal castles at Dunoon in Cowal, Tarbet in Kintyre, as well as a new castle at Dumbarton, in the Earldom of Lennox (now West Dumbarton). Dumbarton was also created into a royal burgh in July 1222.
