= Donnchadh of Argyll =

Scottish noble

Donnchadh of Argyll (Duncan of Argyll)
- Born: before 1175
- Died: Between 1244 and 1248
- Other names: Donnchad mac Dubgaill; Donnchadh of Lorne
- Title: Lord of Argyll, Lord of Lorne
- Predecessor: Ruaidhrí mac Raghnaill (not certain)
- Successor: Eóghan of Argyll
- Spouse: Unknown
- Children: Several, including Eóghan

Donnchadh of Argyll or Donnchadh mac Dubhghaill (Anglicized: "Duncan, son of Dougall") was a late 12th and early 13th century Scottish noble. He was the son of Dubhghall mac Somhairle, son of Somhairle mac Gille Bhrighde. He is the first of the MacDougall lords of Argyll to take the title de Argadia, and can be regarded as the founder of the successful MacDougall lordship of Argyll. He was also a prominent builder, notable for his construction of Ardchattan Priory and Dunstaffnage Castle.

== Biography ==
=== First appearance ===
Born at an unknown date probably somewhere in the mid 12th century, Donnchadh appears in the records for the first time in 1175, appearing along with his father and brother Amhlaibh in the Durham Liber Vitae, making a pilgrimage to St Cuthbert.

=== Construction of Lordship of Argyll-Lorne ===
During Donnchadh's time the great feuds that had been causing war on the western seaboard of Scotland since Somhairle mac Gille Bhrighde were coming to an end. Ruaidhrí mac Raghnaill, son of Raghnall mac Somhairle, King of the Isles and Lord of Argyll, was at peace with Ragnall mac Gofraid, King of Mann, and had become friendly with Ailean mac Lachlainn, Lord of Galloway and Constable of Scotland. In this context, King Alexander II of Scotland led expeditions into Argyll in 1221 and 1222, expeditions which led to Donnchadh being recognised or appointed to the Lordship of Lorne. Donnchadh remained a strong supporter of the Scottish crown against the interests of Ruaidhrí mac Raghnaill and Amhlaibh Dubh.

These expeditions into Argyll appear to have given Donnchadh domination of the kindreds of all Argyll in place of Ruaídhrí. Around 1225, Donnchadh de Argadia ("of Argyll") appeared in a charter of Maol Domhnaich, Earl of Lennox (d. 1250) made to Paisley Abbey; this appearance is notable because it is the first attestation of the locative family name "of Argyll", the name that Donnchadh and his descendants would use to identify themselves among the higher nobility of Scotland.

In 1229, the Manx king Raghnall mac Gofraidh was killed. Fear of Galwegian or Scottish royal intervention led the Manxmen to appeal to the Norwegian crown. The Norwegian expedition, led by Óspakr-Hákon, probably Donnchadh's brother, ravished Kintyre and in 1230 attacked the Stewart controlled Isle of Bute. This expedition was unsuccessful and led to Óspakr-Hákon's death. Donnchadh remained firmly in possession of his Argyll lordship.

=== Death ===
It is likely that soon after these events his son Eóghan began to play a more important role, particularly because Donnchadh was growing old. Donnchadh's death can not be placed with absolute certainty, but it is possible that Donnchadh is the "Mac Somhairle" who died at Ballyshannon in 1247, mentioned in the Annals of Loch Cé:

Mac Somhairle, king of Airer-Gaeidhel, and the nobles of the Cenel-Conaill besides, were slain.

This is what McDonald thinks, but other historians such as Seán Duffy have taken it to refer to Domhnall mac Raghnaill, the progenitor of Clan Donald. Alex Woolf argued that Donnchadh was probably too old at this stage to have been fighting in Ireland, and suggests that the probable identity of this man was Ruaídhrí mac Raghnaill. Sellar also believes that Donnchadh would have been too old, and also suggests identifying this man with Ruaidhrí mac Raghnaill. Donnchadh appeared in Scottish sources in 1237, and again, for the last time, in 1244, as one of the magnates whose names were attached to a letter from Alexander II to the Pope. His son Eóghan appears to have been fully in charge of the lordship by 1249, probably indicating that Donnchadh was dead by this point.

=== Legacy ===
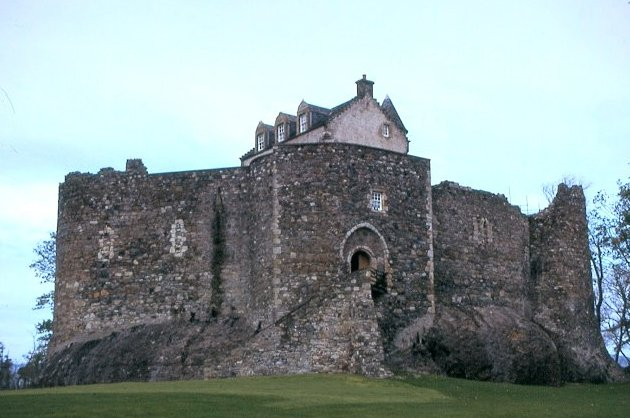
Dunstaffnage Castle, Donnchadh's greatest construction.

Donnchadh, like other Scottish magnates of the time such as Uilleam, Earl of Mar, and Fearchar, Earl of Ross, was a prominent religious patron and castle builder. Around 1230, he founded a house for Valliscaulian monks at Loch Etive; this was Ardchattan Priory. The Valliscaulians were a relatively new religious order fashionable in the reign of Alexander II, with other foundations around the same time at Beauly Priory and Pluscarden Abbey. Donnchadh is remembered for his secular buildings too. It was Donnchadh who constructed Dunstaffnage Castle, the site which became the main seat of the MacDougall lords of Argyll. Donnchadh may have been responsible for the huge hallhouse castle at Aros in Mull.

Donnchadh had several children. The most important of these was his son Eóghan of Argyll, who succeeded to his lordship. It has been alleged, without any authority, that a daughter of Donnchadh named Gill or Egidia married Brian Ua Néill, King of Tír Eógain.

== Notes ==
Preceded by Ruaidhrí mac Raghnaill	Lord of Argyll; 1221x1225-1244x1248	Succeeded by Eóghan (Ewen)
