= Eóghan of Argyll =

Scottish nobleman

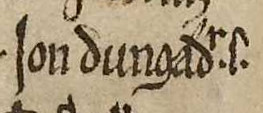
Eóghan's name as it appears on folio 114v of AM 45 fol (Codex Frisianus): "Jon Dungaðarson".

Eóghan MacDubhghaill (Anglicized: Ewan MacDougall, Ewan of Argyll or Ewan of Lorne) was a 13th-century Scottish nobleman and warrior who was styled "King of the Isles", "Lord of Argyll". He was the son of Donnchadh, son of Dubhghall, son of Somhairle mac Gille Brighde.

According to Scandinavian sources, after the death of Haraldr Óláfsson, King of Mann and the Isles in 1248, King Hákon Hákonarson, King of Norway appointed Eóghan as King of the Isles, though within a year that title went to Ewan's paternal second cousin, Dubhghall mac Ruaidhrí.

In response to Eóghan's assumption of this title perhaps, in 1249 King Alexander II, King of Scotland launched an expedition against Eóghan after the latter refused to renounce his homage to Hákon. Alexander II fell ill and died on this expedition, but Eóghan seems to have been temporarily deprived of his Argyll possessions.

In 1250, Eóghan tried to obtain rulership of the Isle of Man, but was expelled by the inhabitants. He then travelled to Norway, hoping for recognition as King of the Isles. This attempt was unsuccessful. By 1255, King Henry III, King of England had secured a deal for Eóghan whereby he regained Lorne and came into full Scottish allegiance.

When Hákon campaigned against the Scots in 1263, Eóghan refused the Norwegian king service and remained a Scottish loyalist. After Hákon's defeat at the Battle of Largs, Eóghan regained formal recognition as ruler of the Isles. His last recorded appearance is in 1268.

Eóghan's son Alasdair followed him as Lord of Argyll. His daughter, Maria (died 1302), married four times: 1st Magnús Óláfsson, King of Mann and the Isles, 2nd Maol Íosa II, Earl of Strathearn, 3rd Hugh, Lord of Abernethy, 4th Sir William FitzWarin.

== Notes ==
Preceded by Donnchadh	Lord of Argyll; 1244 x 1248-c. 1268	Succeeded by Alasdair
