= Ruadhri of Bute =

Ruadhri is an obscure 13th-century noble, who claimed the Isle of Bute through hereditary descent. Outlawed by King Alexander III of Scotland, because of attacks against Scottish lands, which he had undertaken as a result of him being denied his declared patrimony to the Isle of Bute through his hereditary right. When King Haakon IV of Norway began his 1263 expedition against Scotland, Ruadhri presented himself to Hakon and swore fealty to the King of Norway. He was allowed to participate in the attack on Bute, as part of the campaign, with Rothesay Castle surrendering. He took revenge on the garrison, killing nine upon their retreat. He was granted the Isle of Bute by King Hakon, however he disappears from contemporary records shortly afterwards.
