= Lanercost Chronicle =

The Lanercost Chronicle is a northern English history covering the years 1201 to 1346. It covers the Wars of Scottish Independence, but it is also highly digressive and as such provides insights into English life in the thirteenth century as well as Scottish life. It includes Robert the Bruce.

== Origins ==
The English historian Andrew George Little concluded that the chronicle is basically a Franciscan chronicle, which has been adapted, abbreviated, and interpolated at the Augustinian Lanercost Priory. He was able to identify the Chronicle up to 1297 as a version of a lost chronicle of 'Richard of Durham'; after that he believed a different author (with a keen interest in siege equipment and operations) to be responsible, whom he suspected to have been 'Thomas of Otterburn' whose chronicle is mentioned in the Scalachronica. The second author, says Little, "resembles the first only in being a Franciscan and a patriotic hater of the Scots" but an additional similarity is that they are both North-country men. Where most other chroniclers are unclear on the geography of the Borders, the Lanercost Chronicle gives the name of the farmstead at which the Scots reached Tynedale in 1346.

The oldest surviving manuscript of the original Latin text is British Library Cotton Claudius D. vii.

== Editions and translations ==
- Chronicon de Lanercost, 1201-1346: e codice Cottoniano nunc primum typis mandatum, ed. by Joseph Stevenson, [Maitland Club, 46] (Edinburgh: Impressum Edinburgi/The Edinburgh Printing Company, 1839). Other copies here and here.
- The Chronicle of Lanercost, 1272-1346, trans. by Herbert Maxwell (Glasgow: Maclehose, 1913).
