= Eirspennill =

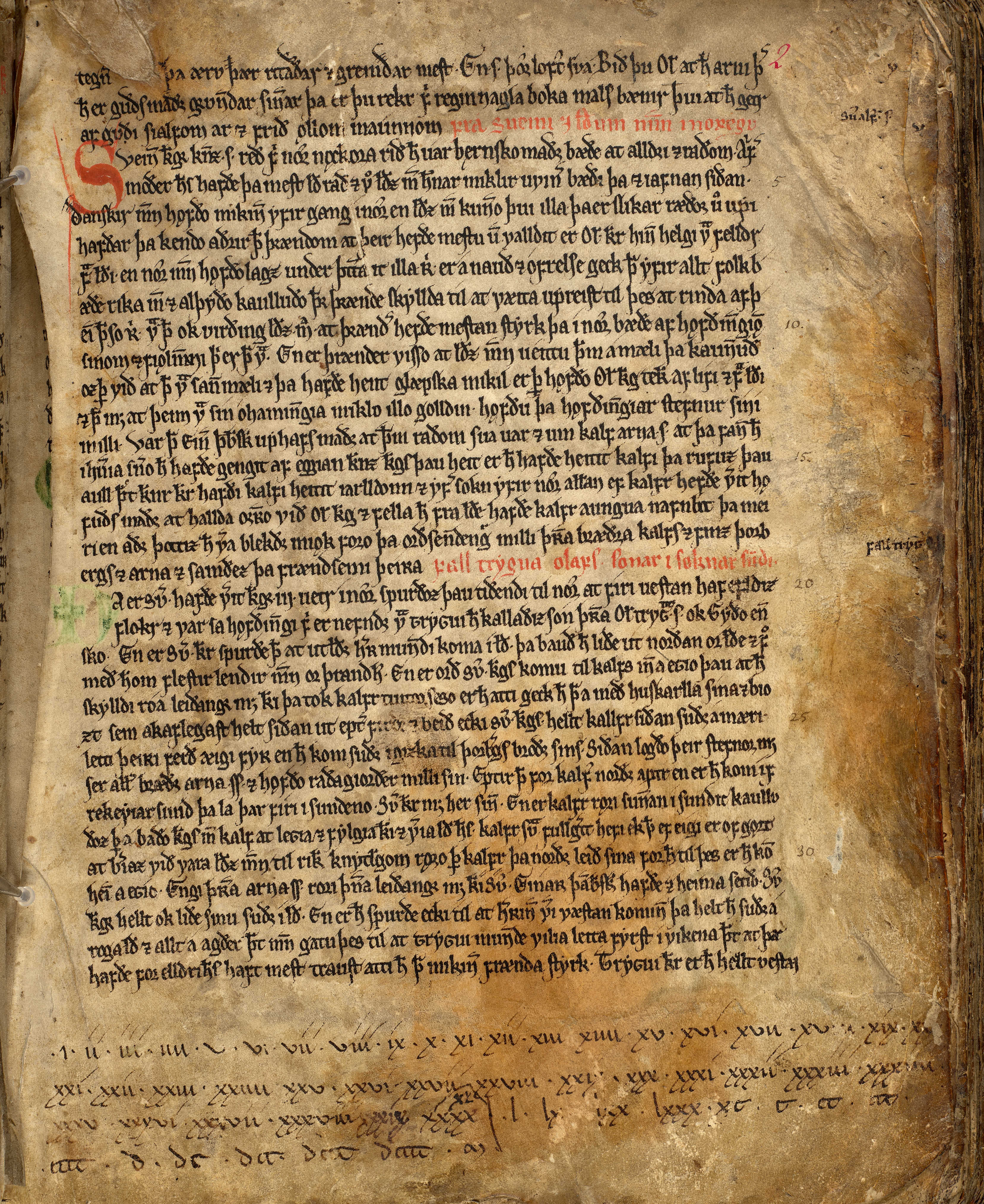
Page from Eirspennill, showing part of Glælognskviða.

Eirspennill, also known as AM 47 fol, is a medieval manuscript which contains copies of four sagas: Heimskringla, Sverris saga, Böglunga sögur, and Hákonar saga Hákonarsonar. The manuscript is considered to date to the early 14th century, and a marginal note within states that in the mid 14th century it belonged to Þranðr Garðarson, Archbishop of Nidaros. The manuscript is believed to have been compiled by two Icelanders.
