= Dubgall mac Somairle =

- King of the Isles
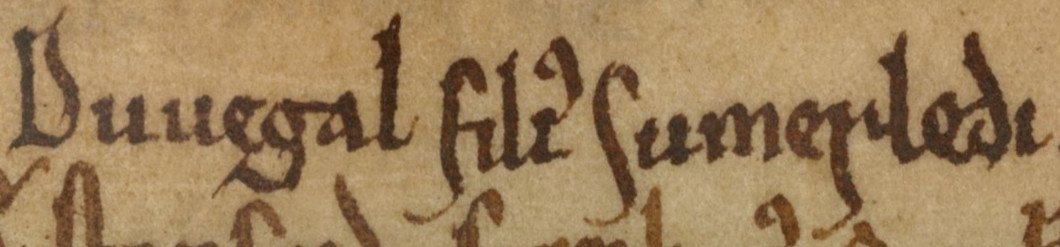
- Dubgall's name as it appears on folio 16v of British Library Cotton Domitian A VII (the Durham Liber vitae): "Dunegal fili(us) Sumerledi".
- Died: 1175
- Issue: Amlaíb; Ragnall; Dubgall; Donnchad; Somairle?; Óspakr-Hákon?
- House: Clann Somairle
- Father: Somairle mac Gilla Brigte
- Mother: Ragnhildr Óláfsdóttir

Dubgall mac Somairle (died 1175) was King of the Isles. (Note: Since the 1980s, academics have accorded Dubgall various personal names in English secondary sources: Dougal, Dougall, Dubgall, Dubhgall, Dubhghall, Dufgall, Dugal, Dugald, Dugall, Duggáll, and Dungal. Likewise, academics have accorded Dubgall various patronyms in English secondary sources: Dubgall mac Somairle, Dubgall mac Sumairlid, Dubhgall mac Somhairle, Dubhgall mac Somhairlidh, Dugald mac Somerled, and Dugald MacSorley.) He was a son of Somairle mac Gilla Brigte and Ragnhildr Óláfsdóttir. Dubgall was a leading figure of Clann Somairle, and the eponymous ancestor of Clann Dubgaill. Dubgall's career is obscure, and little is certain of his life.

In 1155 or 1156, Dubgall was produced as a candidate to the kingship of the Isles, then-possessed by his maternal uncle, Guðrøðr Óláfsson. Later that year, Somairle defeated Guðrøðr, and the kingdom was divided between them. Two years later, Somairle again defeated Guðrøðr, and assumed control over the entirety of the realm. Whilst is possible that Dubgall was the nominal King of the Isles, it is apparent that his father possessed the real power.

Dubgall's father died in an invasion of Scotland in 1164. At least one of Somairle's sons was slain in this defeat, and it is unknown if Dubgall was present. Whilst it is possible that Dubgall retained a degree of royal authority after Somairle's death, it is evident that his maternal uncle Rǫgnvaldr Óláfsson seized the kingship before being defeated by Guðrøðr. Nevertheless, the territories seized by Somairle in 1156 were retained by Clann Somairle.

Dubgall's next and last attestation occurs in 1175, when he is recorded to have made a donation to St Cuthbert at Durham Cathedral. Whilst Somairle appears to have been a religious traditionalist, his descendants associated themselves with reformed monastic orders from continental Europe. Either Dubgall, his father, or his brother Ragnall, may have been responsible for the foundation of the Diocese of Argyll.

Although the division of Clann Somairle territories is uncertain, it is possible that Dubgall held Lorne on the mainland, and the Mull group of islands in the Hebrides. The date of Dubgall's death is unknown. There is reason to suspect that he was succeeded or superseded by Ragnall at some point. Certainly, Ragnall and yet another brother, Aongus, came into conflict before the end of the century—possibly over the leadership of Clann Somairle. Despite Dubgall's apparent overshadowing by Ragnall, the former's Clann Dubgaill descendants were the most powerful branch of Clann Somairle until the fourteenth century.

== Ancestry ==
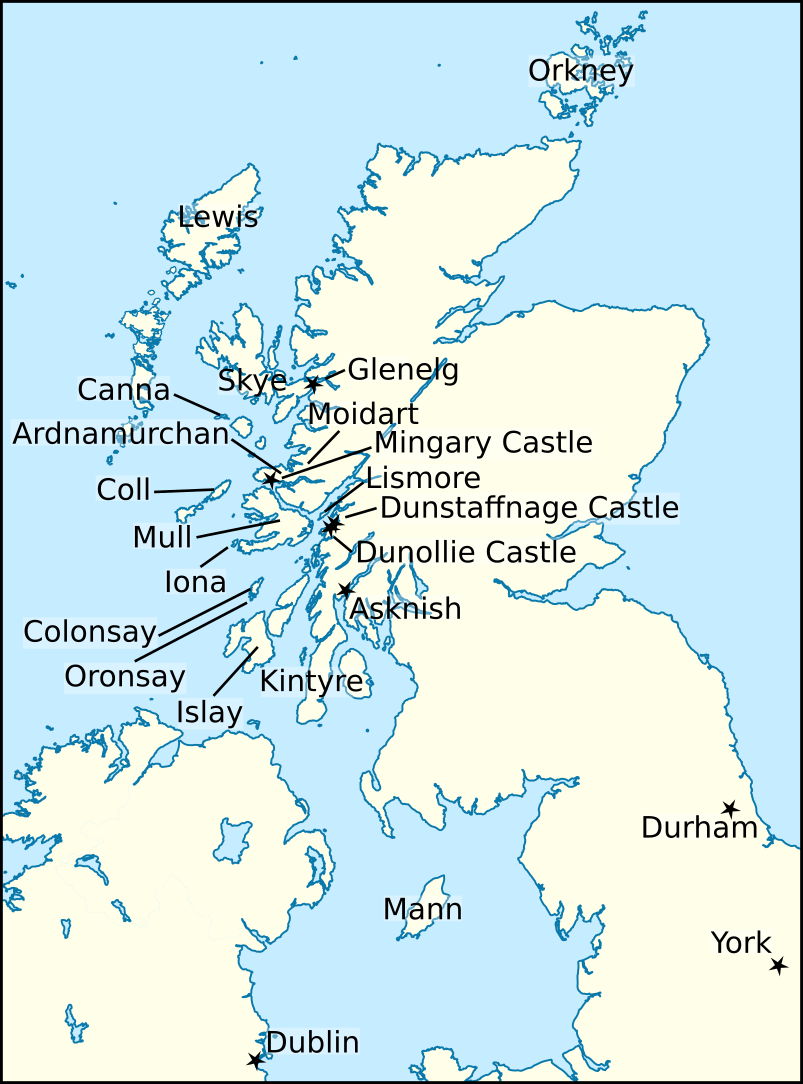
Locations relating to Dubgall's life and times.

Dubgall was a son of Somairle mac Gilla Brigte and Ragnhildr Óláfsdóttir. Somairle's familial origins are obscure, although he was almost certainly of Norse-Gaelic ancestry. Ragnhildr was a daughter of Óláfr Guðrøðarson, King of the Isles. The union of Somairle and Ragnhildr may date to about 1140. According to the thirteenth- to fourteenth-century Chronicle of Mann, the couple had several sons: Dubgall, Ragnall, Aongus, and Amlaíb. There is reason to suspect that Dubgall was the eldest of these sons. Certainly, near contemporary sources such as the chronicle and the thirteenth-century Orkneyinga saga list his name before those of his brothers. Dubgall's name is Gaelic. The mixture of Gaelic and Scandinavian names borne by Somairle and his sons appears to exemplify the hybrid Norse-Gaelic milieu of the Isles. (Note: The Gaelic personal name Dubgall is derived from the word elements dub and Gall, and means "dark foreigner" or "dark stranger". The Gaelic Somairle is a Gaelicisation of the Old Norse Sumarliði.) The marriage between Somairle and Ragnhildr had severe repercussions on the later history of the Isles, as it gave Somairle's descendants—Clann Somairle—a claim to the kingship by way of Ragnhildr's royal descent. (Note: Although the Chronicle of Mann does not identity Ragnhildr by name, her name is nevertheless preserved by Orkneyinga saga. In the words of the chronicle, the union between Ragnhildr and Somairle was "the cause of the collapse of the entire Kingdom of the Isles".)

== King of the Isles ==
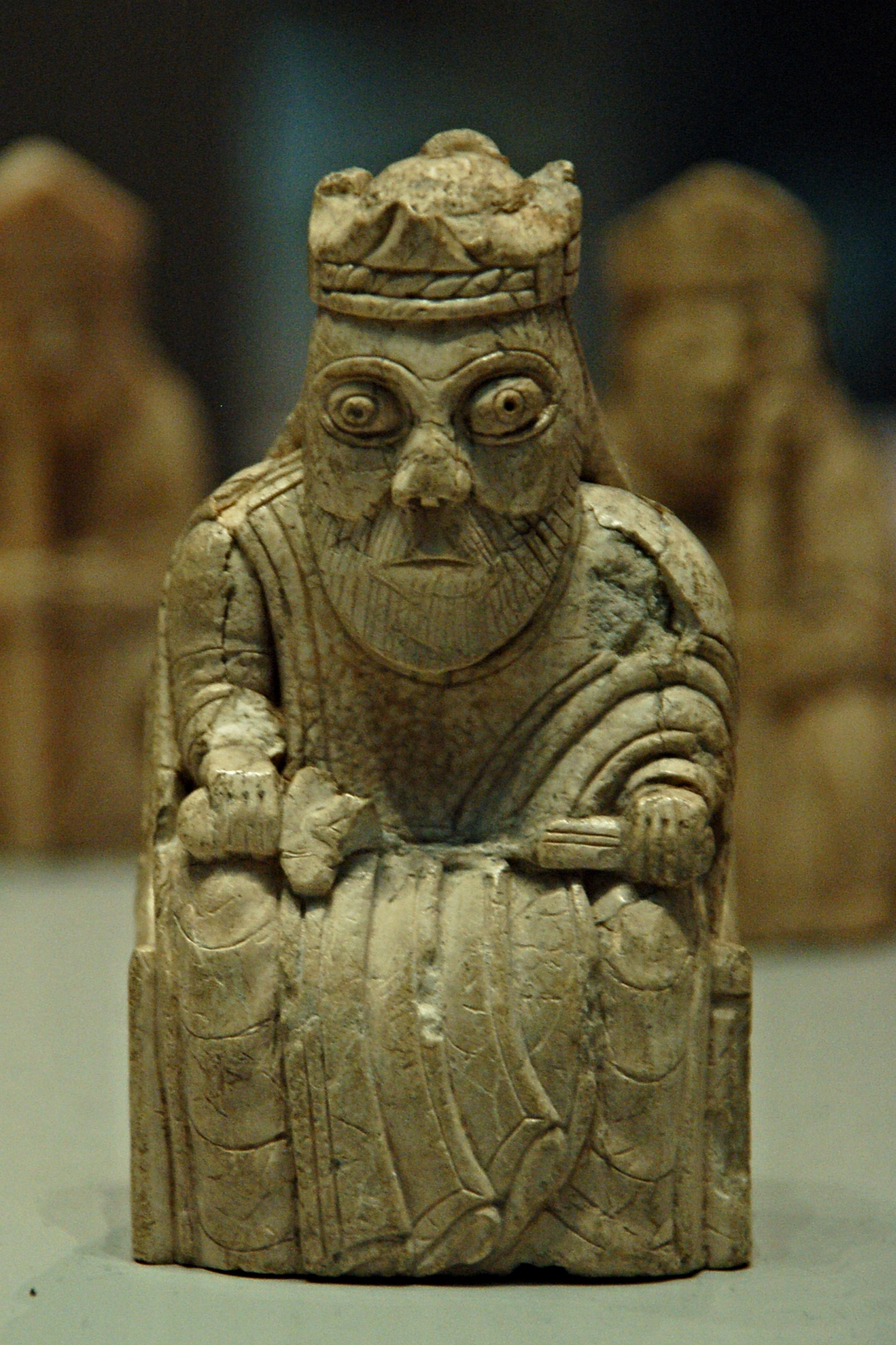
One of the king gaming pieces of the Lewis chessmen. Comprising some four sets, the pieces are thought to have been crafted in Norway in the twelfth- and thirteenth centuries. (Note: They were uncovered in Lewis in the early nineteenth century. Some of the pieces may have arrived in the Isles as a result of Guðrøðr's return from Norway.)

The year 1153 marked a watershed in the history for the Kingdom of the Isles. In June of this year—whilst Óláfr's son, Guðrøðr, was absent in Norway—Óláfr was assassinated by three Dublin-based nephews. Within months, Guðrøðr was able to overcome his kin-slaying cousins, and thereby secured kingship for himself. During the latter's reign as king, both Guðrøðr and Somairle appear to have involved themselves in military campaigns in Ireland. In 1154, for instance, troops from the Isles and the western seaboard of Scotland certainly supported Muirchertach Mac Lochlainn, King of Cenél nEógain in a defeat against the latter's rival Toirrdelbach Ua Conchobair, King of Connacht. Guðrøðr further appears to have unsuccessfully attempted to secure the kingship of Dublin. However, these setbacks suffered under Guðrøðr's rule—perhaps coupled with the rise of Muirchertach's influence in the Isles—may well have incited Dubgall's father to seize the initiative.

In 1155 or 1156, the Chronicle of Mann reveals that Somairle conducted a coup against Guðrøðr, specifying that Þorfinnr Óttarsson—described as one of the leading men of the Isles—produced Dubgall as a replacement to Guðrøðr's rule. The fact that the chronicle identifies Dubgall as the chosen son seems to be further evidence that he was the senior-most of Somairle's sons. Nevertheless, Somairle's stratagem does not appear to have received unanimous support, as the chronicle specifies that the leading Islesmen were made to render pledges and surrender hostages unto him, and that one such chieftain alerted Guðrøðr of Somairle's treachery. Late in 1156, on the night of 5/6 January, Somairle and Guðrøðr finally clashed in a bloody but inconclusive sea-battle. According to the chronicle, Somairle's fleet numbered eighty ships, and when the fighting concluded, the feuding brothers-in-law divided the Kingdom of the Isles between themselves. (Note: The chronicle dates the battle to the year 1156. Since the start of a new year in the Julian calendar is 25 March, the year of the battle in the Gregorian calendar is 1157. Whatever the year, the weather conditions must have been particularly good to permit a naval battle at this time of season.)

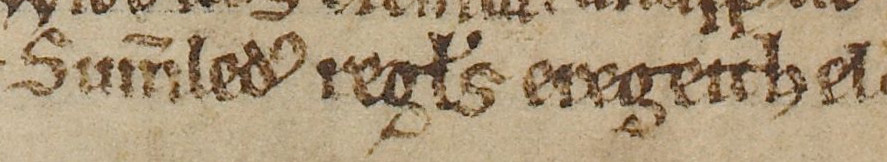
The name and title of Dubgall's father, Somairle mac Gilla Brigte, as it appears on folio 19v of British Library Cotton Faustina B IX (the Chronicle of Melrose): "Sumerledus regulus Eregeithel". The title can translated as "regulus of Argyll".

Although the precise partitioning is unrecorded and uncertain, the allotment of lands seemingly held by Somairle's descendants in the twelfth- and thirteenth centuries could be evidence that he and his son gained the southernmost islands of the Hebrides, whilst Guðrøðr retained the northernmost. As such, Somairle could well have secured control of the Islay and Mull groupings of islands, which left his brother-in-law with Mann and the rest of the Hebrides. Two years after Somairle's initial victory of Guðrøðr, the chronicle reveals that Somairle, with a fleet of fifty-three ships, attacked Mann and drove Guðrøðr from the kingship into exile.

The name of Dubgall's mother, Ragnhildr Óláfsdóttir, as it appears on folio 143r of GKS 1005 fol (Flateyarbók): "Ragnhilldi".

With Guðrøðr gone, it appears that either Dubgall or Somairle became King of the Isles. Although the young Dubgall may well have been the nominal monarch, the chronicle makes it clear that it was Somairle who possessed the real power. Certainly, Irish sources regard Somairle as a king by the end of his career. The reason why the Islesmen specifically sought Dubgall as their ruler instead of Somairle is unknown. Evidently, Somairle was somehow an unacceptable candidate, and it is possible that Ragnhildr's royal ancestry lent credibility to Dubgall that Somairle lacked himself. It was certainly not an unheard-of phenomenon for a powerful figure to set up a son as king under his own overlordship. In fact, Magnús Óláfsson, King of Norway did just this about half a century before by marrying his young son, Sigurðr, to Bjaðmunjo, daughter of the King of Munster, and installing Sigurðr as king over Orkney and the Isles.

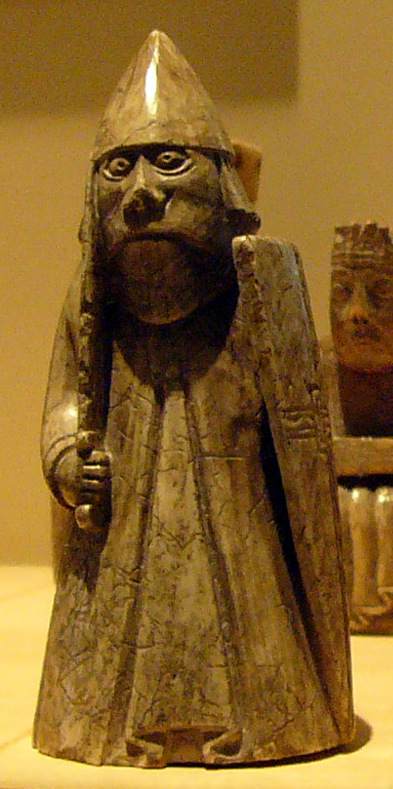
A rook gaming piece of the Lewis chessmen. The Scandinavian connections of leading members of the Isles may have been reflected in their military armament, and could have resembled that depicted upon such gaming pieces.

There may be reason to suspect that Guðrøðr's defeat to Somairle was partly enabled by an alliance between Muirchertach and Somairle. For example, Argyllmen formed part of the mercenary fleet utilised by Muirchertach in 1154, and it is possible that the commander of the fleet, a certain Mac Scelling, was a relation of Somairle himself. If Muirchertach and Somairle were indeed allied at this point in time it may have meant that Guðrøðr faced a united front of opposition. (Note: One of the commanders of these troops is identified as Mac Scelling. This man's name is similar to that of "Gall mac Sgillin", an apparent foster son or bastard son of Somairle noted by the eighteenth-century Book of Clanranald.) If correct, it could also be possible that Þorfinnr participated in Somairle's insurrection as an agent of Muirchertach. On the other hand, the fact that Somairle and Muirchertach jostled over ecclesiastical affairs in the 1160s suggests that these two were in fact rivals. Furthermore, the fact that Þorfinnr may have been related to a previous King of Dublin could reveal that Þorfinnr himself was opposed to Muirchertach's foreign overlordship. If Guðrøðr's difficulties in Dublin date to a period just before Somairle's coup, the cooperation of men like Þorfinnr could be evidence that Dubgall—on account of his mother's ancestry and his father's power—was advanced as a royal candidate in an effort to counter Muirchertach's overlordship of Dublin. (Note: There may be reason to suggest that Þorfinnr was distantly related to Clann Somairle through Ragnhildr's ancestry. Specifically, it is possible that Ragnhildr's mother was Ingibjǫrg, daughter of Páll Hákonarson, Earl of Orkney. Ingibjǫrg was in turn a maternal granddaughter of Moddan, an eminent Caithnessman who had a son named Óttar. The fact that Moddan had a son so-named could be evidence that Moddan's wife was related to Þorfinnr's family (since Þorfinnr's father was named Óttar as well). If all these possibilities are correct, it is conceivable that a familial relationship could have played a part in Þorfinnr's allegiance to Somairle. There may have been another factor contributing to animosity between Þorfinnr and Guðrøðr. For example, it is possible that Þorfinnr was related to Ottar mac meic Ottair, King of Dublin, an Islesmen who had attained the kingship of Dublin in 1142. This act may well have represented a threat to the authority of Guðrøðr's father, and the prospects of Guðrøðr himself. Certainly, the men who slew Óláfr a decade after Ottar's accession were raised in Dublin. Enmity between Þorfinnr and Guðrøðr, therefore, could have been a continuation of hostilities between their respective families.)

== Clann Somairle succession ==
Somairle died in a seaborne invasion of Scotland that culminated in a disastrous battle fought near Renfrew in 1164. The various depictions of Somairle's forces—stated to have been drawn from Argyll, Dublin, and the Isles—appear to reflect the remarkable reach of power that this man possessed at his peak. Several sources also state that a son of Somairle was slain in the battle. According to the thirteenth-century Gesta annalia I, Somairle was killed with a son named Gilla Coluim. It is possible that this source has mistaken the latter's name for Gilla Brigte, the name that the fourteenth-century Annals of Tigernach accords to Somairle's slain son. In any case, Gilla Brigte appears to have been a product of another marriage, a union that may have predated Somairle's binding to Ragnhildr. It is unknown if Dubgall was at the battle with Somairle and Gilla Brigte. In fact, it is unknown what role Dubgall played in the administration of the Isles during his father's floruit.

Although it is conceivable that Dubgall was able to secure power following his father's demise, it is evident from the Chronicle of Mann that the kingship was seized before the end of the year by Guðrøðr's brother, Rǫgnvaldr Óláfsson. Almost immediately afterwards, Guðrøðr is said by the same source to have arrived on Mann, and ruthlessly overpowered his brother. Guðrøðr thereafter regained the kingship, and the realm was divided between the Crovan dynasty and Clann Somairle, in a partitioning that stemmed from Somairle's original strike against Guðrøðr in 1156. At one point, after noting this 1156 segmentation, the chronicle laments the "downfall" of the Kingdom of the Isles from the time Somairle's sons "took possession of it". One possibility is that this statement is evidence that members of Clann Somairle held a share of the kingdom before their father's demise. It could even be evidence that it was not Somairle who possessed the partition, but his sons.

The names of Aongus and Ragnall, brothers of Dubgall, as they appear on folio 143r of GKS 1005 fol: "Rỏgnvalldr ok Engull".

There is uncertainty regarding the succession of Clann Somairle after Somairle's demise. Although the Chronicle of Mann appears to reveal that Dubgall was the senior dynast in the 1150s, his next and last attestation fails to accord him a royal title. One possibility is that Dubgall was succeeded or supplanted by Ragnall, whose recorded title of rex insularum, dominus de Ergile et Kyntyre ("king of the Isles, lord of Argyll and Kintyre") could indicate that Ragnall claimed control over the Clann Somairle territories. (Note: The fact that Dubgall appears on record before Ragnall's first attestation may be further evidence that Dubgall was the senior of the two.) Quite how Dubgall was succeeded or superseded is unrecorded and unknown.

Although there is no direct evidence that Somairle's imperium fragmented upon his death, there is reason to suspect that it was indeed divided between his sons. (Note: Parallels of such familial partitioning can be found amongst the Orcadian comital family and the Crovan dynasty.) Whilst the division of territories amongst later generations of Clann Somairle can be readily discerned, such boundaries are unlikely to have existed during the chaotic twelfth century. It is possible that the territory of the first generation of Clann Somairle stretched from Glenelg in the north, to the Mull of Kintyre in the south: with Aongus ruling in the north, Dubgall centred in Lorne (with possibly the bulk of the inheritance), and Ragnall in Kintyre and the southern islands. (Note: Somairle's original territorial domain appears to have consisted of Argyll. The fact that later generations of Dubgall's descendants were also based in Argyll could indicate that Dubgall was himself centred there. This could in turn be evidence that Dubgall succeeded his father as head of the kindred. If Dubgall did indeed succeed his father, it is conceivable that Dubgall was styled in Gaelic rí Airer Goidel ("king of Argyll"). Certainly, later descendants of Dubgall styled themselves de Ergadia ("of Argyll"). Orkneyinga saga states that Somairle's family lived í Dölum í Skotlandsfjörðum ("in the Dale of Scotland's Fjords"). One possibility is that this source refers to Argyll, another is that it specifically refers to the Firth of Lorne.)

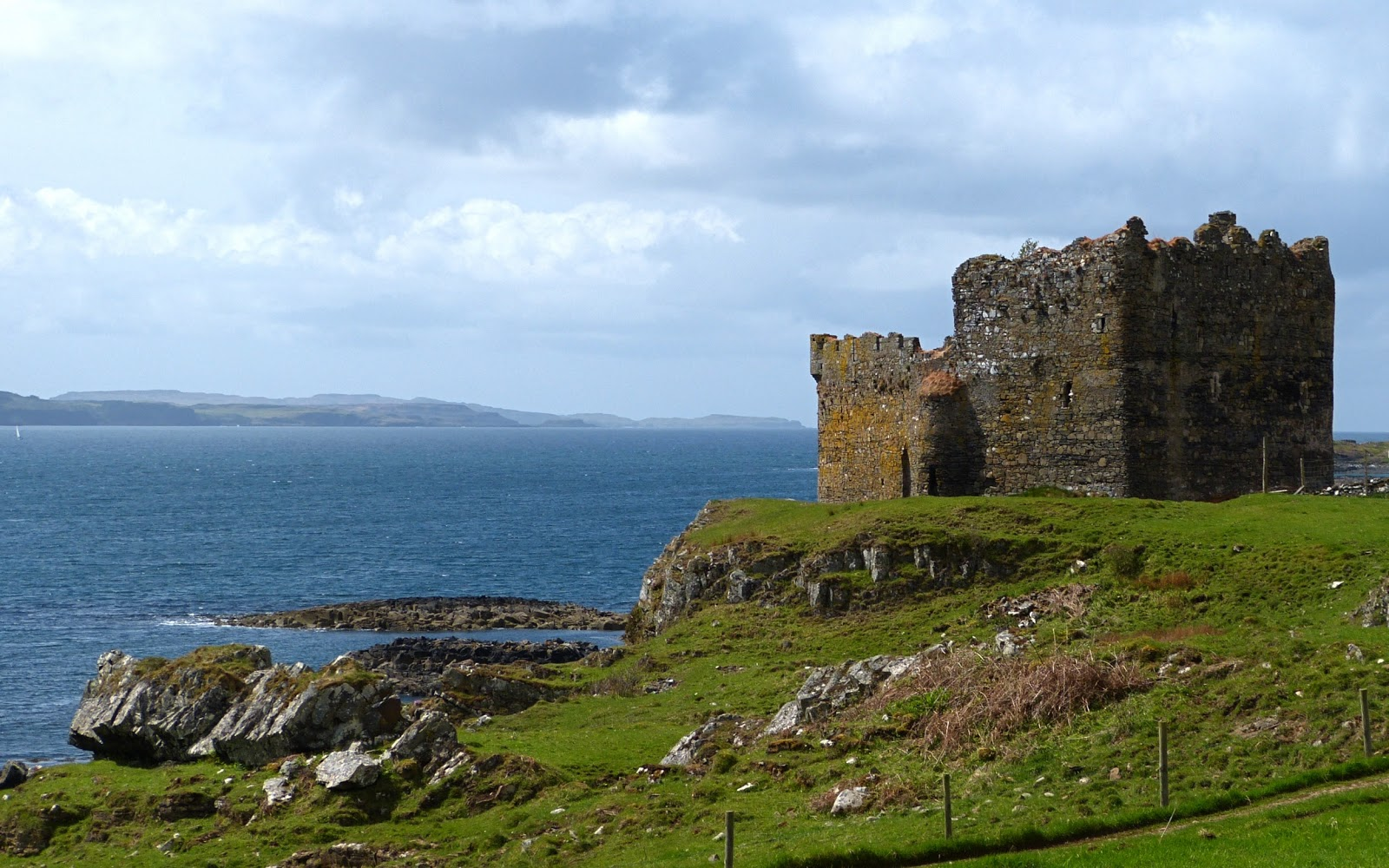
Ruinous Mingary Castle before its renovation. This thirteenth- or fourteenth-century citadel may have been constructed by Dubgall's descendants. As such it would appear to exemplify the northern extension of Clann Dubgaill power from the twelfth century.

There is reason to suspect that Dubgall also controlled the Mull group of islands. According to the seventeenth-century Sleat History—a Clann Dòmnaill source that is opening disparaging in its treatment of Dubgall's descendants—the territories allotted to Dubgall was confined to Lorne—from the head of Loch Leven in the north, to Asknish in the south. The source further claims that he had no right of inheritance in the Isles on account of illegitimacy, and thus depicts Dubgall's control of the Mull group of islands as a baseless extension of authority at the expense of legitimate members of Clann Somairle. (Note: Several sources—such as National Library of Scotland Advocates' 72.1.1 (MS 1467) and the fourteenth-century Book of Ballymote—claim that (Dubgall's descendants) Clann Dubgaill descended from a son of Dubgall's brother, Ragnall, rather than from a son of Somairle. Whilst it is possible that this is an innocent mistake, there is reason to suspect that it is intentional. The pedigrees presented by these sources certainly reduce Clann Dubgaill's line of descent to the same level as that of (Ragnall's descendants) Clann Ruaidrí and Clann Domnaill. In fact, the author of the genealogical material preserved by National Library of Scotland Advocates' 72.1.1—a man who was almost certainly in the employ of Clann Domnaill—may have set the precedent of disparaging accounts of Clann Dubgaill's familial origins for later clan historians. The Sleat History certainly gives a derogatory account of Dubgall, and claims that he was an illegitimate son of Somairle in order to stigmatise his descendants.) As such, the Sleat History attempts to associate the Ardnamurchan branch of Clann Domnaill with the maritime regions of Moidart and Ardnamurchan, during the floruit of Ragnall, by way of a convoluted tale concerning the defeat of a supposed associate of Dubgall. In fact, when Ardnamurchan appears on record in 1293 it may have comprised part of the lordship held by Dubgall's descendants, and may well have been held by them for a considerable period of time before.

== English attestation ==
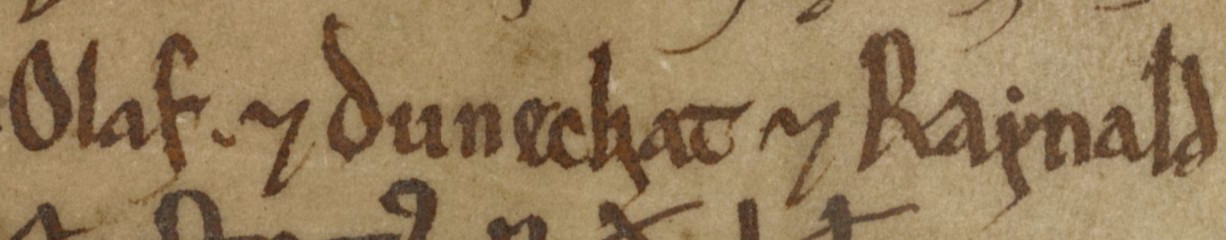
The names of Dubgall's sons Amlaíb, Donnchad, and Ragnall, as they appear on folio 16v of British Library Cotton Domitian A VII: "Olaf, (et) Dunechat, (et) Raynald".

Following Dubgall's part in his father's coup of 1156, Dubgall's next and last attestation occurs in 1175, when he visited Durham Cathedral upon the eve of the feast of St Bartholomew (23 August), with the Durham Cantor's Book recording his gift of two gold rings and the pledge of 1 mark annuity to St Cuthbert for the rest of his life.

Dubgall's donation was evidently undertaken in the context of travelling from York, where William I, King of Scotland and leading Scottish magnates are otherwise known to have sworn fealty to Henry II, King of England that very year. (Note: The record of Dubgall in Durham could indicate that a member of Clann Somairle was responsible for the notice of several Hebridean territories incorporated into Libellus de admirandis beati Cuthberti virtutibus, a twelfth-century text concerning the Cult of St Cuthbert composed by Reginald of Durham.)

Upon the occasion of his donation, Dubgall is stated to have been accompanied by Stephen—his chaplain—and a certain Adam de Stanford. Together the three are said to have been accepted into the fraternity of the church of Durham. The text specifies that Dubgall's gift was made "at the feet of the saint", suggesting that the ceremony took place before an image of St Cuthbert, or (perhaps more likely) at his shrine. (Note: Stephen and Adam are unlikely to have been Argyllians or Hebrideans.)

The Durham Liber vitae corroborates Dubgall's presence in Durham by recording his name with those of Stephen and Adam. Also noted are three sons of Dubgall: Amlaíb, Donnchad, and Ragnall. If the latter three were indeed present, however, it is unclear why they are not recorded to have entered the fraternity of St Cuthbert like the other three.

== Possible ecclesiastical foundation ==
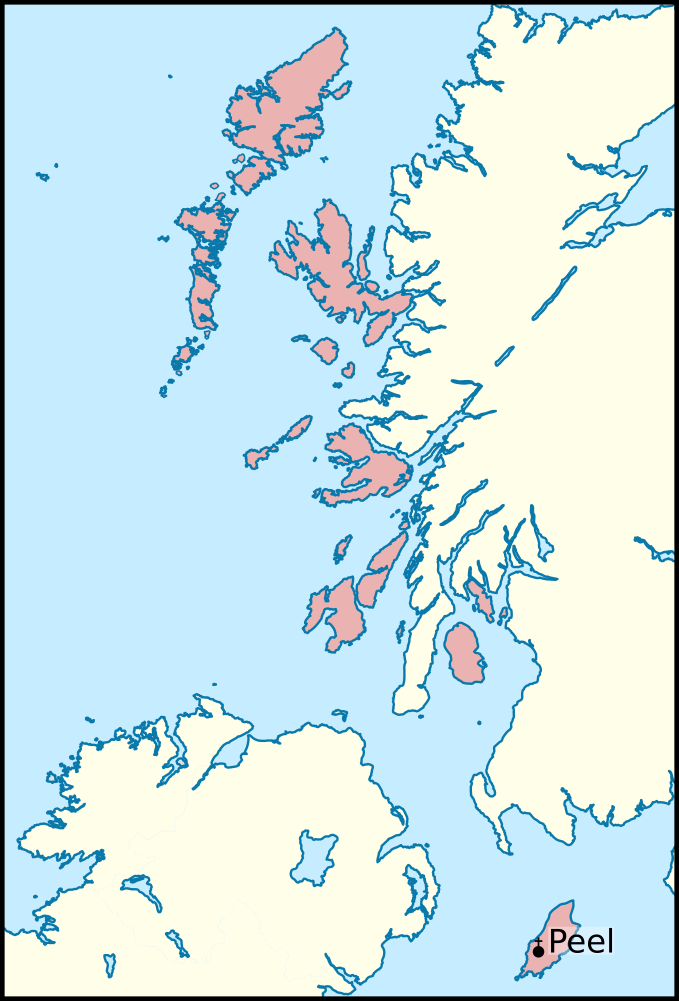
Extent of the Diocese of the Isles, c.1300.

The ecclesiastical jurisdiction within the Kingdom of the Isles was the far-flung Diocese of the Isles. Little is known of its early history, although its origins may well lie with the Uí Ímair imperium. Early in Guðrøðr's reign, the diocese came to be incorporated into the newly established Norwegian Archdiocese of Niðaróss. In effect, the political reality of the Diocese of the Isles—its territorial borders and nominal subjection to far-off Norway—appears to have mirrored that of the Kingdom of the Isles. Before the close of the twelfth century, however, evidence of a new ecclesiastical jurisdiction—the Diocese of Argyll—begins to emerge during ongoing contentions between Clann Somairle and the Crovan dynasty.

Although the early diocesan succession of Argyll is uncertain, the jurisdiction itself appears to have lain outwith the domain of the Crovan dynasty, allowing Clann Somairle to readily act as religious patrons without outside interference. Like the Kingdom of the Isles itself, the great geographic size of the Diocese of the Isles appears to have contributed to the alienation of outlying areas, and to its eventual disintegration. In fact, there is reason to suspect that portions of the Diocese of Argyll were likewise detached from the Scottish dioceses of Dunblane, Dunkeld, and Moray. Although the Scottish Crown may well have welcomed the formation of the new diocese as a means to project Scottish royal authority into the region, Clann Somairle rulers generally appear to have been hostile to the Scots, and the diocesan seat on Lismore lay far outwith the Scottish king's sphere of authority. (Note: According to tradition, the original church on Lismore was founded by the Irish missionary Mo Luóc. There is reason to suspect that Clann Somairle fostered the cult of this saint to promote the early diocese. First recorded in the early fourteenth century, the cathedral on Lismore appears to have been constructed by members of Clann Dubgaill. It may have served as the diocesan seat from the earliest days of the diocese.)

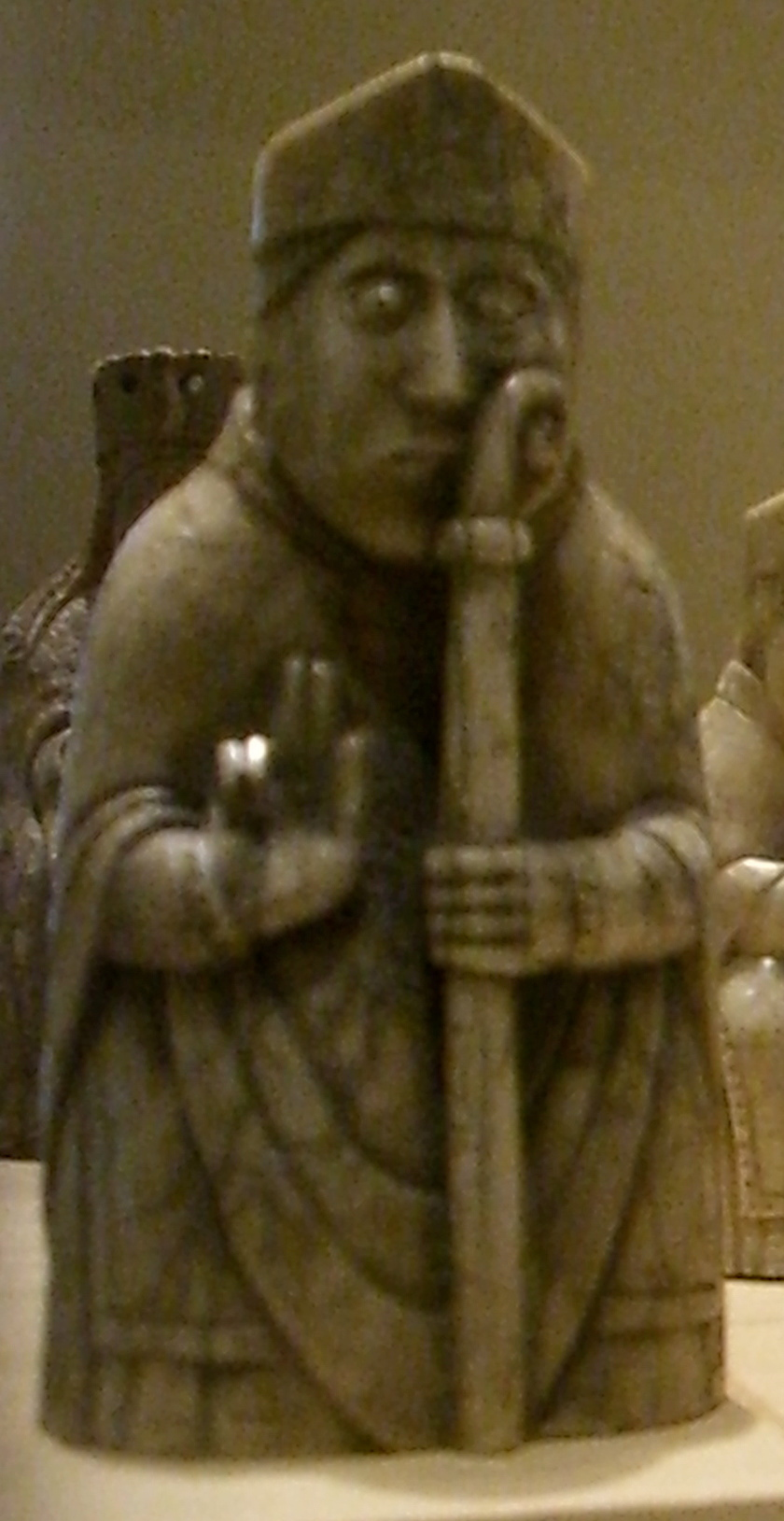
A bishop gaming piece of the Lewis chessmen. (Note: The pictured piece depicts a seated bishop, holding a crozier with two hands, and wearing a chasuble as an outer garment. The simple horned mitre worn by this particular piece may be evidence that it dates to the mid twelfth century, when horns began to be positioned on the front and back, as opposed to the sides of the headdress.)

The foundation of the Diocese of Argyll appears to have been a drawn-out and gradual process that is unlikely to have been the work of a single individual—be he Somairle, Ragnall, or Dubgall himself. Nevertheless, Dubgall's attestation in Durham could indicate that he was closely associated with William I. If the latter was involved in the creation of the diocese, he could well have facilitated the lords of Argyll in their ecclesiastical endeavours. The evidence of an amiable relationship between William I and Dubgall could add weight to the possibility that Dubgall was also involved. Although the early diocese suffered from prolonged vacancies—with only two bishops are recorded to have occupied the see before the turn of the mid thirteenth century—over time it became firmly established in the region, allowing the Clann Somairle leadership to retain local control of ecclesiastical power and prestige.

There is reason to suspect that Somairle and his sons were able to extend their influence into the Diocese of the Isles through the appointment of an Argyllman, Christian, as Bishop of the Isles. One possibility is that this man was appointed by Dubgall himself. Christian's predecessor was Reginald, a Norwegian. Christian's tenure appears to lasted from at least about 1170 to the early 1190s, although the fact that Reginald seems to have followed Guðrøðr into Norwegian exile could indicate that Christian began his episcopate whilst Somairle held the kingship. (Note: In 1176/1177, the marriage of Guðrøðr and Findguala Nic Lochlainn was formalised under the auspices of the visiting papal legate, Vivian, Cardinal priest of St Stephen in Celio Monte. The fact that this ceremony was conducted by Silvan, Abbot of Rievaulx—and not Christian—could be evidence of antipathy between Guðrøðr and Christian.) Even though Christian's notice by the Chronicle of Mann suggests that he held the approval of the monks of Rushen Abbey, his episcopacy appears to have spanned a period of reorientation from Mann towards territories controlled by Clann Somairle. In any case, it is evident that Christian was ousted and replaced by a Manxman, Michael, who appears to have been a candidate backed by the Crovan dynasty, represented by the recently inaugurated Rǫgnvaldr Guðrøðarson, King of the Isles. Although Christian probably received confirmation from the monks of Furness Abbey—a right originally granted to the monks by Dubgall's maternal grandfather—Christian's episcopacy is not noted by the Icelandic Annals, which could be evidence that he was consecrated by the Archbishop of York rather than the Archbishop of Niðaróss. (Note: The Icelandic Annals states that, after the death of Reginald, the see was vacant for forty years, until the appointment of John in 1210.)

Compared to his immediate descendants, who associated themselves with reformed monastic orders from continental Europe, Somairle appears have been something a religious traditionalist. In 1164, he attempted to persuade Flaithbertach Ua Brolcháin, Abbot of Derry—the comarba ("heir" or "successor") of St Columba—to relocate to Iona. This attempt by Somairle to restore the Columban leadership to Iona starkly contrasted with the actions of his descendants, who oversaw the obliteration of the island's Columban monastery, and founded a Benedictine monastery in its place. The new monastery's foundation charter dates to December 1203, which could indicate that Ragnall was responsible for its foundation. The eighteenth-century Book of Clanranald certainly identifies Ragnall as the founder. However, there is no hard evidence linking him to it. Since the charter reveals that the monastery received substantial endowments from throughout the Clann Somairle domain, it is likely that the foundation was supported by other leading members the kindred, such as Dubgall (if he were still alive) or Donnchad. (Note: The endowment included lands in Lorn and Kintyre, and on islands such as Canna, Coll, Colonsay, Iona, Islay, Mull, and Oronsay.) Dubgall's attestation in Durham certainly shows that he was a benefactor of the Benedictine order. In any event, the charter placed the monastery under the protection of Pope Innocent III, which secured its episcopal independence from the Diocese of the Isles. As such, the price for the privilege of Iona's papal protection appears to have been the adoption of the Benedictine Rule, and the supersession of the island's centuries-old institution of St Columba.

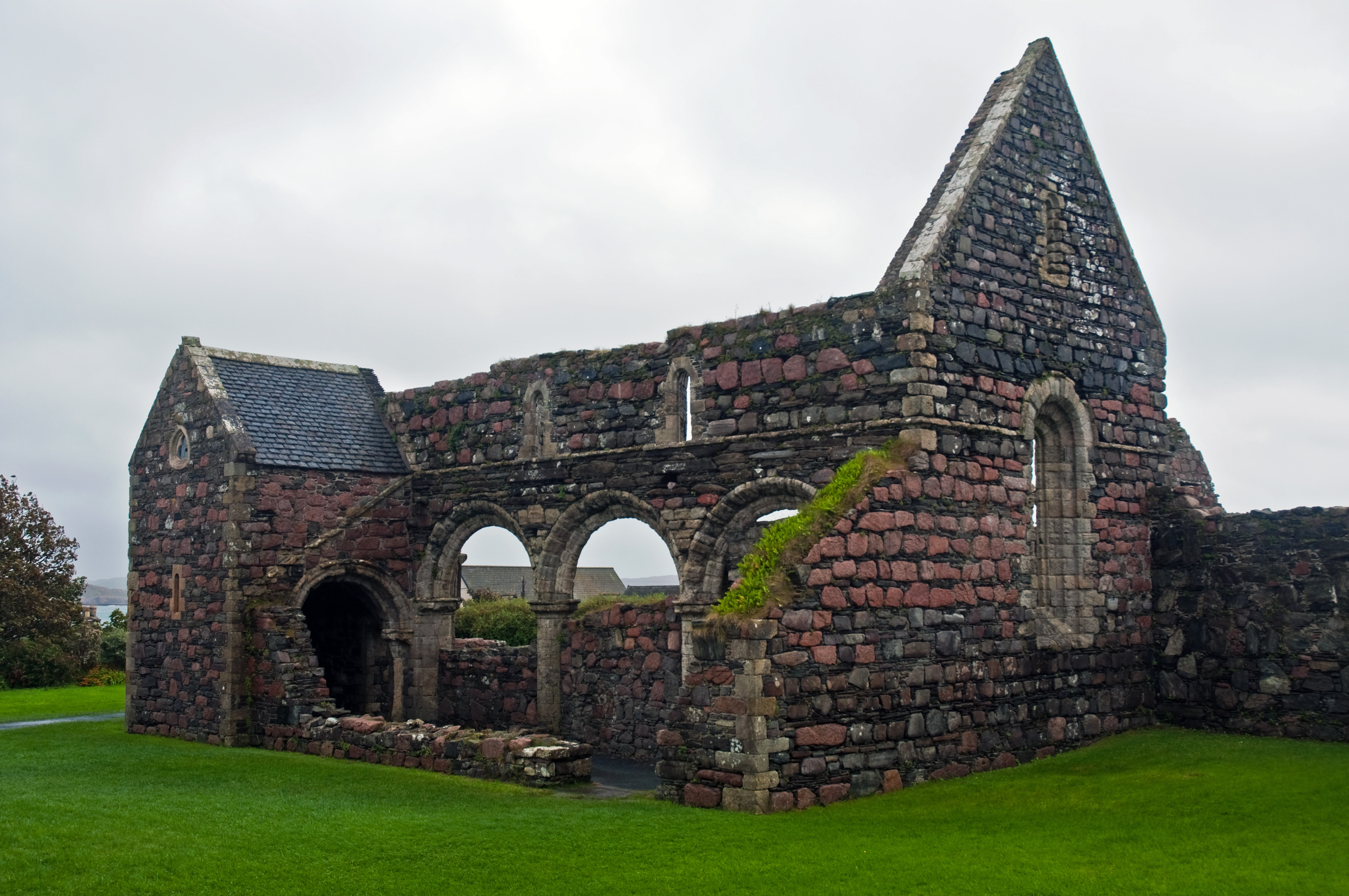
The remains of Iona Nunnery, an Augustinian religious that may have been built before the turn of the thirteenth century. Dubgall's sister, Bethóc appears to have been its first prioress.

Bethóc, a daughter of Somairle, appears to have been the first prioress of Iona Nunnery. This Augustinian house may have been built near the end of the twelfth century, or perhaps in the first decade of the next. According to the Book of Clanranald, Ragnall was responsible for the foundation of this house. The same source describes Bethóc as "a religious woman and a Black Nun", whilst the Sleat History states that she was a prioress on Iona. Although these accounts are somewhat suspect—as the colour black refers to Benedictines not Augustinians—Bethóc's historicity is corroborated by an inscription upon her tombstone, transcribed in the seventeenth-century as: "Behag nijn Sorle vic Ilvrid priorissa". (Note: Bethóc may have been the first owner of the thirteenth-century Iona Psalter made in Oxford.) Dubgall's donation to the cult of St Cuthbert in Durham, together with the establishment of a Benedictine monastery and an Augustinian nunnery on Iona, are evidence of fundamental ecclesiastical changes affecting the Norse-Gaelic society of the Isles in the twelfth- and thirteenth centuries.

== Descendants ==
The name of Dubgall's son, Dubgall, as it appears on 162v of AM 47 fol (Eirspennill): "Dugall skrækr". The epithet attributed to the latter in this excerpt, skrækr, translates to "screech". (Note: This Scandinavian epithet, borne by a man with a Gaelic name, exemplifies the hybrid culture of the Kingdom of the Isles.)

Dubgall's attestation in Durham is one of the few examples of Clann Somairle integration into the Scottish realm before the end of the thirteenth century. Nothing further is recorded or known of Dubgall, and the date of his death is unknown.

Dubgall was the eponymous ancestor of the Clann Dubgaill branch of Clann Somairle. (Note: Since the 1980s, academics have accorded the clan various names in English secondary sources: Clan Dougall, Clan Dugall, clan Dugall, Clan MacDougall, clan MacDougall, Clann Dhubhghaill, Clann Dubgaill, Clann Dubhgaill, Clann Dubhgall, Clann Dubhghaill, the mac Dougalls, the Mac Dougalls, the Mac Dubgaills, the MacDougall clan, the MacDougalls, the Macdougalls, the MacDougals, the MacDowells, the MacDubhghaill family, the meic Dubgaill, the Meic Dubgaill, the meic Dubhgaill, the meic Dubhgall, the MhicDubhgaills, and the Mic Dubhghaill. The first certain record of a member of the clan bearing a family name in reference to Dubgall is that of his great-grandson, Alasdair Mac Dubgaill in 1299. An earlier reference to the clan surname may be that of Dubgall's grandson (and Alasdair's father), Eógan Mac Dubgaill, identified as Johannes filius Dugaldi by the Chronicle of Mann. In any event, such family names appear after two generations for Clann Ruaidrí and Clann Domnaill.) The two other main branches of Clann Somairle—Clann Ruaidrí and Clann Domnaill—descended from eponymous sons of Dubgall's brother, Ragnall. Several late mediaeval pedigrees—such as those preserved by National Library of Scotland Advocates' 72.1.1 (MS 1467) and the Book of Lecan—identify Dubgall's descendants variously as Clann Somairle. The fact that such terminology is not accorded to Clann Ruaidrí and Clann Domnaill may be further evidence that Dubgall and his successors represented the senior line of Somairle's descendants.

The name and title of Óspakr-Hákon as it appears on folio of 174r of GKS 1005 fol: "Vspakr konungr". Hákonar saga Hákonarsonar describes several sons and suspected sons of Dubgall (Dubgall, Donnchad, Óspakr-Hákon, and Somairle) as Hebridean kings.

Other than their notice by the Liber vitae, nothing further is recorded of Dubgall's sons Amlaíb and Ragnall. Scandinavian sources reveal that Dubgall was the father of a certain Dubgall, who is accorded an epithet meaning "screech". Both Donnchad and this man—alongside a certain kinsman Somairle, who could have been either a son or nephew of Dubgall—are recorded to have participated in a Norwegian-backed invasion of the Isles in 1230. The leader of this campaign was Óspakr-Hákon, yet another possible son of Dubgall. Certainly, Scandinavian sources state that Óspakr-Hákon was a brother of Dubgall's sons Dubgall and Donnchad. Óspakr-Hákon evidently carved out a career in Norway earlier in the century, and was eventually installed as King of the Isles by Hákon Hákonarson, King of Norway. Donnchad's last certain attestation occurs in 1237.

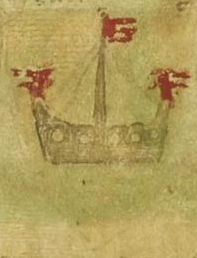
The arms of the Lord of Argyll depicted in the fourteenth-century Balliol Roll. (Note: The escutcheon is blazoned: or, a galley sable with dragon heads at prow and stern and flag flying gules, charged on the hull with four portholes argent. The coat of arms corresponds to the seal of Alasdair Mac Dubgaill. Since the galley (also known as a lymphad) was a symbol of Clann Dubgaill and seemingly Ragnall—ancestor of Clann Ruaidrí and Clann Domnaill—it is conceivable that it was also a symbol of Somairle himself. It was also a symbol of the Crovan dynasty, which could mean that it passed to Somairle's family through Ragnhildr.)

About three and a half decades after Dubgall's final notice, several historical sources appear to indicate that kin-strife amongst Clann Somairle was a cause of increasing instability in the Isles: for example the fifteenth- to sixteenth-century Annals of Ulster reports that Ragnall's sons attacked the men of Skye in 1209, whilst the Chronicle of Mann relates that Aongus—along with his three sons—fell in battle on the same island in 1210. These records may be evidence that Ragnall's sons were attempting to extend their authority over Skye, and it is possible that they overcame and slew Aongus and his sons there. This last stand on Skye could indicate that Aongus had succeeded Ragnall as the representative of Clann Somairle, and that Ragnall's sons responded by eliminating their uncle and his line. If so, it is possible that Ragnall's son, Ruaidrí, seized the Clann Somairle succession after the annihilation of Aongus' branch of the kindred. These accounts of Hebridean warfare may, therefore, signify a radical redistribution of the Clann Somairle imperium.

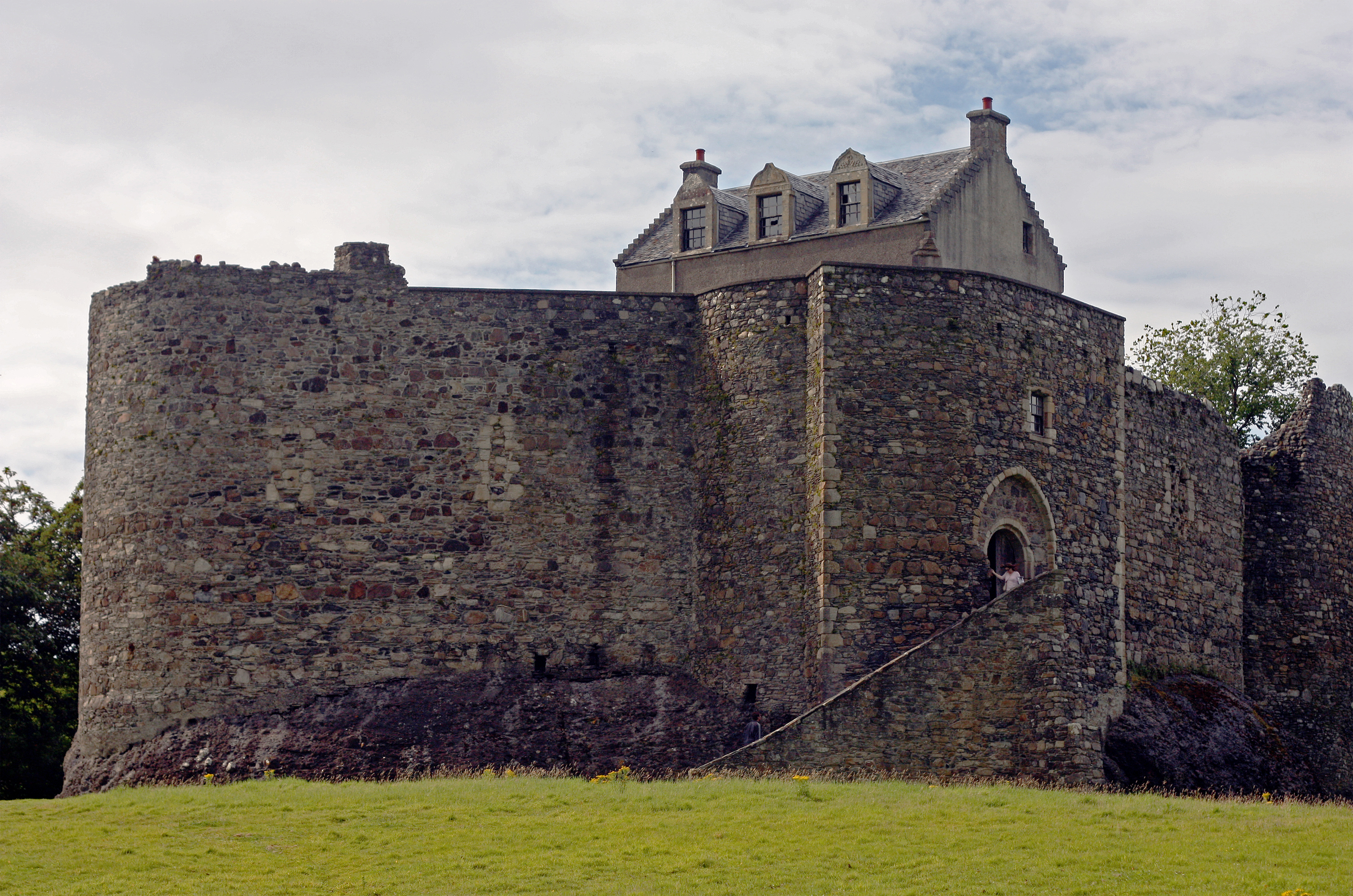
Dunstaffnage Castle was probably built by Donnchad, and expanded upon by his son, Eógan, and/or Eógan's son, Alasdair. The latter was yet another Clann Dubgaill king. (Note: Dunstaffnage Castle appears to have been the principal seat of Clann Dubgaill. Another fortified site associated with the family is Dunollie Castle, located about 5 kilometres (3.1 mi) away. The visible remains of this building probably date to the fifteenth century, although the early history of the site is less certain. The archaeological find of an English silver penny seems to place the remains of a rampart as far back as the thirteenth century, whilst a particular unstratified potsherd may be evidence of its use in the previous century. As such, it is possible that either Dubgall or Donnchad were responsible for the construction of an earthwork castle at Dunollie.)

Earlier in 1192, the Chronicle of Mann records that Ragnall was defeated by Aongus in a particularly bloody battle. The chronicle does not identify the location of the battle, or elaborate under what circumstances it was fought. Nevertheless, it is possible that the conflict took place in the northern part of the Clann Somairle domain where some of Aongus' territories may have lain. Whilst this clash could have been result of Ragnall's rise in power and expansion at Dubgall's expense, the encounter could also mark Ragnall's downfall, and perhaps even his death.

Although there is reason to suspect that there was also contention between Dubgall and Ragnall, and that the former came to be overshadowed by the latter, Dubgall's descendants overtook Ragnall's by the mid part of the thirteenth century. By the 1240s, for example, Clann Dubgaill was the dominant kindred on Scotland's western seaboard, and had begun to align itself with leading families in the eastern and lowland regions of the Scottish realm. Clann Dubgaill retained its supremacy in the west until its eclipse in the fourteenth century, during the reign of Robert I, King of Scotland.

== Ancestry ==
Ancestors of Dubgall mac Somairle

8. Gilla Adamnáin (Note: There are numerous pedigrees outlining the patrilineal ancestry of Somairle's descendants. Although these pedigrees take the Somairle's line several generations further back than Gilla Adamnáin, the successive names become more unusual, and the pedigrees begin to contradict each other. Consequently, Gilla Adamnáin may be the furthest the patrilineal line can be taken back with confidence. The patronym accorded to Somairle by the Annals of Tigernach refers to Gilla Brigte, whilst the patronym accorded to Somairle by the Annals of Ulster refers to Gilla Adamnáin. Together with the evidence of Bethóc's inscribed tombstone (which also names Gilla Brigte), these sources appear to corroborate the identities of Somairle's father and grandfather.)
4. Gilla Brigte mac Gilla Adamnáin
2. Somairle mac Gilla Brigte (died 1164)
1. Dubgall mac Somairle (died 1175×)
12. Guðrøðr Crovan (died 1095) (Note: The familial origins of Guðrøðr Crovan are uncertain.)
6. Óláfr Guðrøðarson (died 1153)
3. Ragnhildr Óláfsdóttir
7. uncertain (Note: There is reason to suspect that Ragnhildr's mother was Ingibjǫrg, daughter of Páll Hákonarson, Earl of Orkney (died 1137).)

== Citations ==
Dubgall mac Somairle Clann Somairle Died: 1175×
Regnal titles
Preceded by Guðrøðr Óláfsson	King of the Isles^{1} With: Somairle mac Gilla Brigte	Succeeded by Rǫgnvaldr Óláfsson
Notes and references
1. Either Somairle or Dubgall gained the kingship from Guðrøðr in 1156. Whilst it is possible that Dubgall was the nominal monarch, it is evident that the real power was possessed by Somairle, and Irish sources certainly regarded the latter as king later in his career.
