= Ragnvald Olafsson =

Ragnvald Olafsson or Rǫgnvaldr Óláfsson may refer to:

- Ragnvald Heidumhære (fl. 9th century), possibly son of Olaf Geirstad-Alf, petty king of Vestfold
- Rǫgnvaldr Óláfsson (fl. 1164), king of Mann and the Isles
- Rǫgnvaldr Óláfsson (died 1249), king of Mann and the Isles

== See also ==
- Rogvolod, 10th-century prince of Polotsk
