= Ragnald of the Isle of Man =

Ragnald of the Isle of Man may refer to:

- Ragnall mac Gofraid, early 11th-century King of the Isles
- Rǫgnvaldr Óláfsson (fl. 1164), ruler of the Isle of Man for a brief period in 1164
- Rǫgnvaldr Guðrøðarson, King of the Isles 1187–1226
- Rǫgnvaldr Óláfsson (died 1249), King of the Isles for a brief period in 1249
