= Reginald I =

Reginald I may refer to:

- Reginald I, Count of Burgundy (968–1057), Count of the Free County of Burgundy from 1026
- Reginald I, Count of Bar (died 1149), called "the One-eyed", Count of Bar from 1105
- Reginald I of Guelders (1255–1326), Count of Guelders from 1271
- Rögnvaldr Óláfsson (fl. 1164) (fl. 1164), referred to in some texts as Reginald, ruler of the Isle of Man for a brief period in 1164
