= Rǫgnvaldr Óláfsson (fl. 1164) =

- King of the Isles
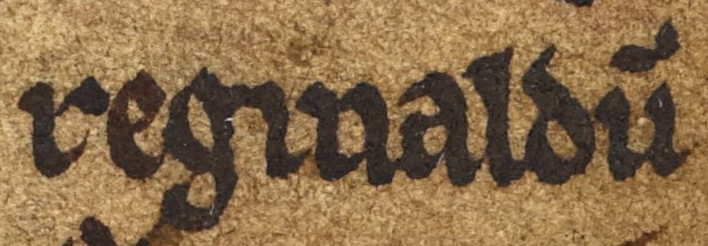
- Rǫgnvaldr's name as it appears on folio 39r of British Library Cotton Julius A VII (the Chronicle of Mann): "Reginaldum".
- House: Crovan dynasty
- Father: Óláfr Guðrøðarson

Rǫgnvaldr Óláfsson (fl. 1164) was a twelfth-century King of the Isles, succeeding the warrior Somerled. He was a son of Óláfr Guðrøðarson, King of the Isles and a member of the Crovan dynasty. In the 1153, Óláfr was assassinated by three nephews, before his son, Guðrøðr, was able to overcome them and succeed his father as king. By 1158, Guðrøðr was forced from power by his brother-in-law, Somairle mac Gilla Brigte, who was married to Óláfr's daughter Ragnhildr. In 1164, when Somairle was killed in an invasion of Scotland, and while Guðrøðr was away in exile overseas, Rǫgnvaldr briefly seized the kingship for himself, before being overcome by Guðrøðr, who had him blinded and mutilated.

== Background ==
Rǫgnvaldr was a son of Óláfr Guðrøðarson, King of the Isles. The men were members of the Crovan dynasty. According to the thirteenth- to fourteenth-century Chronicle of Mann, Óláfr was married to Affraic, daughter of Fergus, Lord of Galloway. According to this source, Óláfr and Affraic had a son, Guðrøðr. Óláfr is further stated to have had many concubines by whom he had several daughters and three sons: Rǫgnvaldr himself, Lǫgmaðr, and Haraldr. One of Óláfr's daughters is stated by the chronicle to have married Somairle mac Gilla Brigte, Lord of Argyll. Although this daughter is not named by the chronicle, she is identified as Ragnhildr by the thirteenth-century Orkneyinga saga.

In 1153, the thirteenth- to fourteenth-century Chronicle of Mann reports that Óláfr was assassinated by three nephews whilst Guðrøðr was absent in Norway. Within months of his father's assassination, Guðrøðr executed his vengeance. According to the chronicle, he journeyed from Norway to Orkney, enstrengthened by Norwegian military support, and was unanimously acclaimed as king by the leading Islesmen. He is then stated to have continued on to Mann, where he overcame his father's three killers, putting one to death whilst blinding the other two, and successfully secured the kingship for himself.

In 1155 or 1156, the chronicle reveals that Somairle conducted a coup against Guðrøðr, specifying that Somairle's son, Dubgall, was produced as a replacement to Guðrøðr's rule. Late in 1156, Somairle and Guðrøðr finally clashed in a bloody but inconclusive sea-battle. According to the chronicle, when the clash finally concluded the feuding brothers-in-law divided the Kingdom of the Isles between themselves. Two years later, the chronicle reveals that Somairle invaded Mann and drove Guðrøðr from the kingship into exile. With Guðrøðr gone, it appears that either Dubgall or Somairle became King of the Isles. Although the young Dubgall may well have been the nominal monarch, the chronicle makes it clear that it was Somairle who possessed the real power. Certainly, Irish sources regard Somairle as a king by the end of his career.

== Reign ==
Somairle lost his life in a failed invasion of Scotland in 1164. Although it is possible that Dubgall was able to secure power following his father's demise, it is evident that the kingship was seized by Rǫgnvaldr within the year. According to the chronicle, his reign began after he defeated a force of Manxmen at Ramsey. Almost immediately afterwards, Guðrøðr made his return, with the chronicle reporting that Guðrøðr arrived on Mann with a large body of men, overpowered Rǫgnvaldr, having him mutilated and blinded. Guðrøðr thereafter regained the kingship, and the realm was divided between him and Somairle' descendants, in a partitioning that stemmed from Somairle's coup in 1156.

== Citations ==
Rǫgnvaldr Óláfsson Crovan dynasty
Regnal titles
Preceded by Dubgall mac Somairle^{1} Somairle mac Gilla Brigte^{1}	King of the Isles; 1164	Succeeded by Guðrøðr Óláfsson
Notes and references
1. Either Somairle or Dubgall gained the kingship from Guðrøðr in 1156. Whilst it is possible that Dubgall was the nominal monarch, it is evident that the real power was possessed by Somairle, and Irish sources certainly regarded the latter as king later in his career. It is unknown if Dubgall held royal power after his father perished in 1164.
