= Aonghus mac Somhairle =

Norse-Gaelic magnate (died 1210)

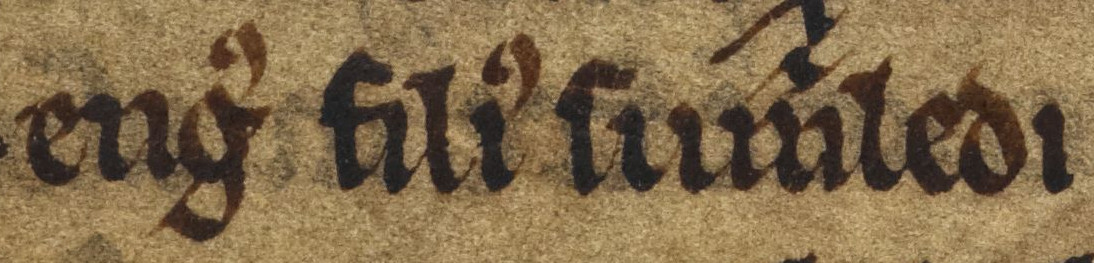
- Aonghus' name as it appears on folio 41r of British Library Cotton Julius A VII (the Chronicle of Mann): "Engus filius Sumerledi".
- Died: 1210; Skye
- Noble family: Clann Somhairle
- Father: Somhairle mac Giolla Brighde
- Mother: Ragnhildr Óláfsdóttir

Aonghus mac Somhairle (died 1210) was a leading member of Clann Somhairle. (Note: Since the 1980s, academics have accorded Aonghus various personal names in English secondary sources: Áengus, Aenghus, Aengus, Angus, Aonghus, and Aongus. He is likewise accorded the patronym: Aongus mac Somairle.) He was a son of Somhairle mac Giolla Brighde, King of the Isles and Ragnhildr Óláfsdóttir. Other sons of Somhairle and Ragnhildr include Dubhghall, Raghnall, and possibly Amhlaoíbh. Aonghus' father was the common ancestor of Clann Somhairle. The succession of this kindred upon Somhairle's death is uncertain. The Clann Somhairle imperium appears to have spanned from Glenelg in the north, to the Mull of Kintyre in the south. It is possible that Aonghus came to rule in the north, with Dubhghall centred in Lorne, and Raghnall in Kintyre and the southern islands.

Although one mediaeval chronicle appears to indicate that Dubhghall succeeded Somhairle, Raghnall eventually gained dominance, perhaps at Dubhghall's expense. In time, Raghnall and Aonghus came into conflict, and Aonghus is recorded to have defeated Raghnall outright in 1192. The fact that Raghnall does not appear on record after this event could mark his downfall and death. In 1209, Raghnall's sons are recorded to have defeated the men of Skye, and the following year Aonghus and his sons are reported to have been slain on the same island. These events appear to indicate that Aonghus succeeded Raghnall in about 1192, and was killed by the latter's sons—Ruaidhrí and Domhnall—after which Ruaidhrí seems to have secured control of the succession.

As a result of the kin-strife between Raghnall and Aonghus, Raghnall appears to have forged an alliance with the family of Walter fitz Alan, Steward of Scotland. One consequence of the struggle between the brothers seems to have been the extension of authority of the steward's family into Cowal and the islands of the Firth of Clyde. Although Ruaidhrí originally seems to have held power in Kintyre, his later descendants are known to have held lordship in the Hebrides and the lands the main territories that came to be known as Garmoran. One possibility is that these territories were gained after Aonghus' death, and the annihilation of his line.

== Clann Somhairle dynast ==
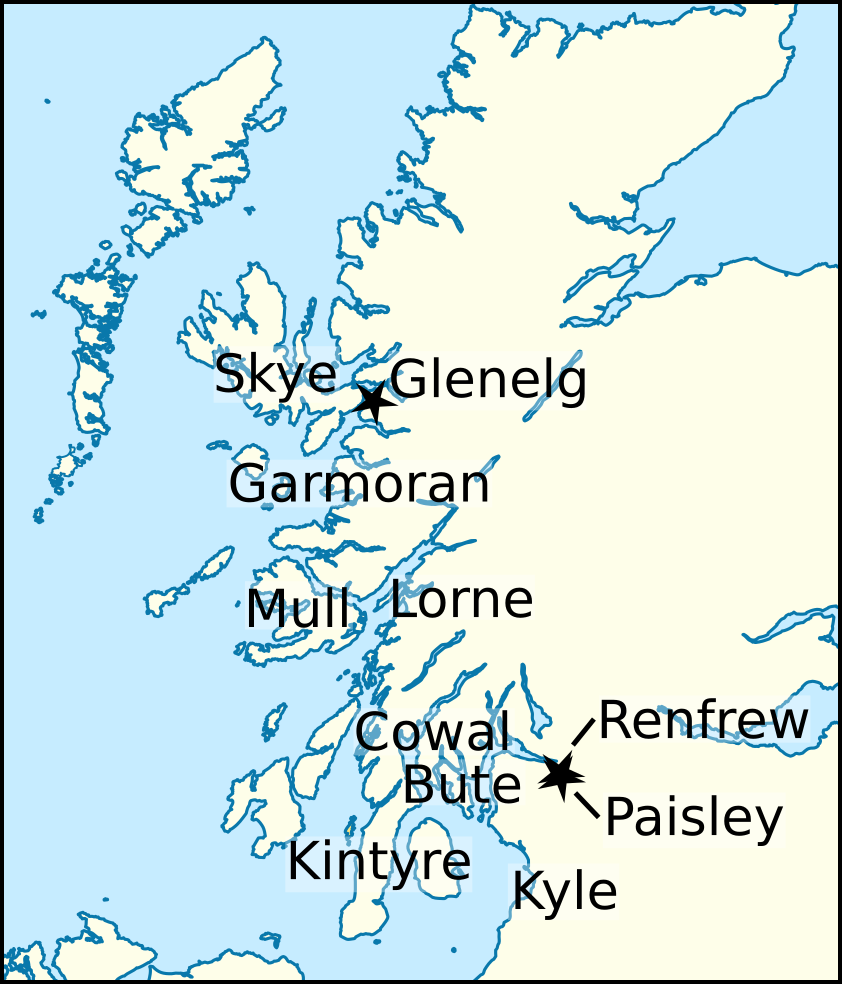
Locations relating to Aonghus' life and times.

Aonghus was a son of Somhairle mac Giolla Brighde, King of the Isles, the common ancestor of Clann Somhairle. Aonghus' mother was Ragnhildr, daughter of Óláfr Guðrøðarson, King of the Isles. According to the thirteenth- to fourteenth-century Chronicle of Mann, Somhairle and Ragnhildr had several sons: Dubhghall, Raghnall, Aonghus, and Amhlaoíbh. Aonghus appears to have been a younger brother of Raghnall. The Clann Somhairle claim to the kingship of the Isles seems to have stemmed from its descent from Ragnhildr, a granddaughter of the common ancestor of the Crovan dynasty. In the mid twelfth century, Somhairle confronted Ragnhildr's brother, Guðrøðr Óláfsson, King of the Isles, and wrested the kingship from him. Somhairle's coup resulted in the division of the Kingdom of the Isles between his descendants and Guðrøðr's.

There is uncertainty regarding the succession of the Clann Somhairle leadership after Somhairle's death in 1164. Although the Chronicle of Mann appears to reveal that Dubhghall was the senior dynast in the 1150s, this man's next and last attestation, preserved by the Durham Liber vitae, fails to accord him a royal title. One possibility is that Dubhghall was succeeded or supplanted by Raghnall, whose recorded title of rex insularum, dominus de Ergile et Kyntyre ("king of the Isles, lord of Argyll and Kintyre") could indicate that Raghnall claimed control over the Clann Somhairle territories.

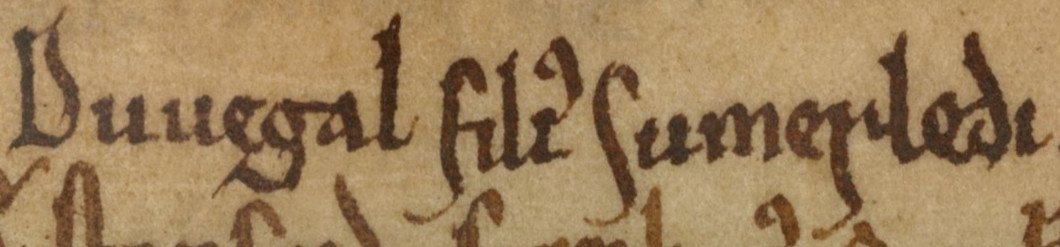
The name of Aonghus' brother, Dubhghall, as it appears on folio 16v of British Library Cotton Domitian A VII (the Durham Liber vitae): "Dunegal filius Sumerledi".

Although there is no direct evidence that Somhairle's imperium fragmented upon his death, there is reason to suspect that it was indeed divided between his sons. (Note: Parallels of such familial partitioning can be found amongst the Orcadian comital family and the Crovan dynasty.) Whilst the division of territories amongst later generations of Clann Somhairle can be readily discerned, such boundaries are unlikely to have existed during the chaotic twelfth century. It is possible that the territory of the first generation of Clann Somhairle stretched from Glenelg in the north, to the Mull of Kintyre in the south: with Aonghus ruling in the north, Dubhghall centred in Lorne (with possibly the bulk of the inheritance), and Raghnall in Kintyre and the southern islands.

== Attestations and extirpation ==
The names of Aonghus and his brother, Raghnall, as they appear on folio 143r of GKS 1005 fol (Flateyarbók): "Rỏgnvalldr ok Engull".

As with Dubhghall, the year and circumstances of Raghnall's death are uncertain as surviving contemporary sources fail to mark his demise. In 1192, the Chronicle of Mann records that he was defeated by Aonghus in a particularly bloody battle. The chronicle does not identify the location of the battle, or elaborate under what circumstances it was fought. Nevertheless, it is possible that the conflict took place in the northern part of the Clann Somhairle domain where some of Aonghus' territories may have lain. Whilst the clash between Raghnall and Aonghus could have been result of Raghnall's rise in power and expansion at Dubhghall's expense, the encounter could also mark Raghnall's downfall, and perhaps even his death.

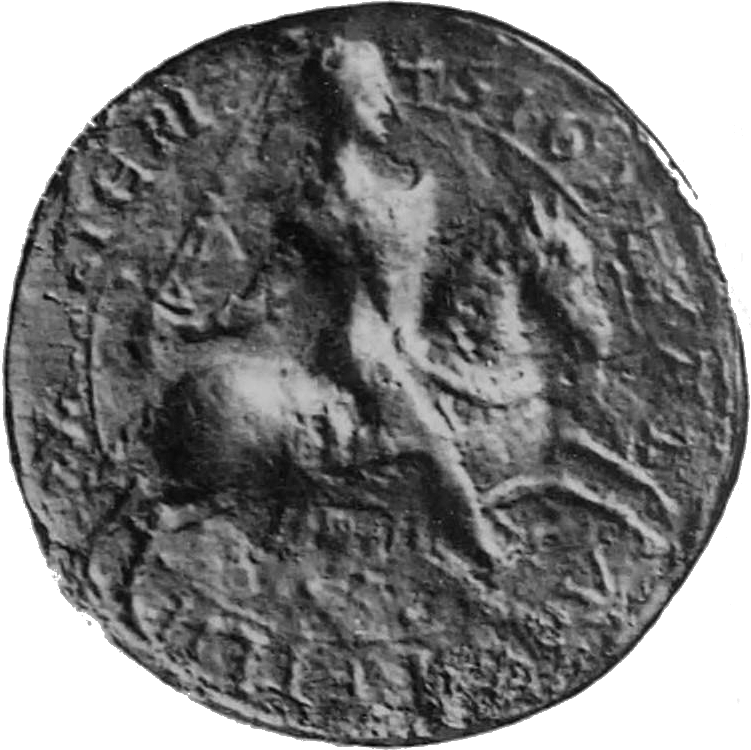
The seal of Alan fitz Walter, displaying an armed knight on horseback.

There is reason to suspect that the inter-dynastic infighting amongst Clann Somhairle was capitalised upon by the ambitious neighbouring kindred of Walter fitz Alan, Steward of Scotland. At some an uncertain date, Raghnall is known to have made a grant to the Cluniac priory of Paisley. This religious house—which in time became an abbey—was closely associated with Walter's family.

Since Raghnall's grant appears to postdate the clash between him and Aonghus, it could be evidence of an attempt by Raghnall—who may have been seriously weakened from his defeat—to secure an alliance with Walter's son and successor, Alan fitz Walter, Steward of Scotland. Earlier in the century, the steward's family had accumulated substantial lordships near Renfrew and in northern Kyle. Possibly before Walter's death in 1177, or perhaps during the tenure of his succeeding son, the family seems to have extended its influence westward into Cowal, and beyond the frontier of the Scottish realm into the islands of the Firth of Clyde.

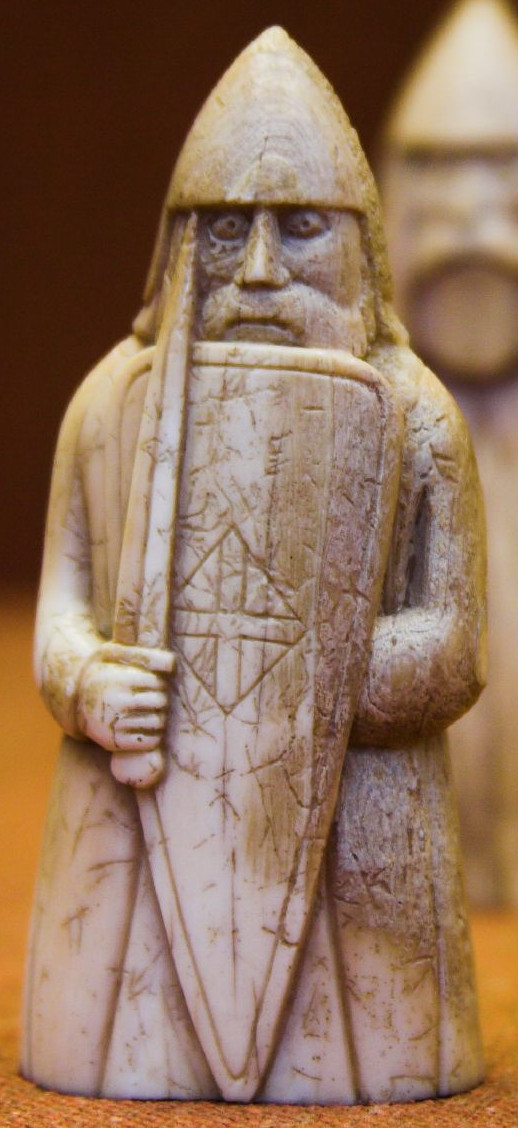
One of the rook gaming pieces of the Lewis chessmen. The Scandinavian connections of leading members of the Isles may have been reflected in their military armament, and could have resembled that depicted upon such gaming pieces.

The fact that Bute seems to have fallen into the hands of this kindred by about 1200 could indicate that Alan capitalised upon Clann Somhairle's internal discord and thereby seized the island. Alternately, it is also possible that Alan received the island from Raghnall as payment for military support against Aonghus, who seems to have had gained the upper hand over Raghnall by 1192. (Note: There is no evidence indicating that Aonghus ever controlled Bute. However, there is evidence to suggest that a dynasty native to the island was displaced by the Alan's family. For example, a certain Ruðri appears on record in the early thirteenth century claiming the island as his birthright.)

Alan's extension into the west may well have been a cause of concern for William I, King of Scotland. Not only were these islands outwith his own jurisdiction, but they formed part of the Kingdom of the Isles, and were technically within the jurisdiction of the Norwegian commonwealth. It is possible that the alliance between Alan and Raghnall partly precipitated the king's establishment of a royal castle and burgh at Ayr in 1197. This fortress extended Scottish royal authority into the outer Firth of Clyde region, and was probably intended to dominate not only William's peripheral barons, but also independent rulers—such as those of Clann Somhairle and the Crovan dynasty—just beyond the borders of the Scottish realm. Alan's westward expansion appears to have suddenly ceased by about 1200, perhaps partly in consequence of royal anxiety concerning the alliance.

In 1210, the chronicle reports that Aonghus, and his three sons, were slain in battle on Skye. The year before, the fifteenth- to sixteenth-century Annals of Ulster reports that the sons of Raghnall—apparently Ruaidhrí and Domhnall—defeated the men of Skye with great slaughter.

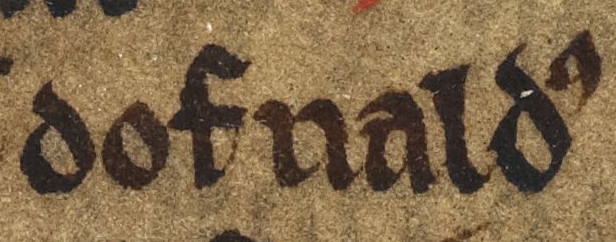
Ostensibly the name of Aonghus' nephew, Domhnall mac Raghnaill, as it appears on folio 47v of British Library Cotton Julius A VII: "Dofnaldus".

The annal-entry of 1209 and the chronicle account of 1210 appear to reveal that the Clann Somhairle kin-strife was the cause of increasing instability in the Isles. These two sources could well refer to connected events. For instance, they may be evidence that Raghnall's sons were attempting to extend their authority over the island, and it is possible that it was Ruaidhrí and Domhnall who overcame and slew Aonghus and his sons on Skye. This last stand on Skye could indicate that Aonghus had succeeded Raghnall as the representative of Clann Somhairle, and that Raghnall's sons responded by eliminating their uncle and his line. If so, it is possible that Ruaidhrí seized the Clann Somhairle succession after the annihilation of Aonghus' branch of the kindred. (Note: Some sources (such as The Scots Peerage) erroneously claim that a granddaughter of Aonghus—named "Jean"—married Alexander Stewart, Steward of Scotland. The mother of Alexander's son, James, is uncertain. Nevertheless, surviving evidence suggests that Alexander was married to Joanna, daughter of Richard Comyn; and that Alexander's sister, Eva, was in turn married to Richard's son, John.) These accounts of Hebridean warfare may, therefore, signify a radical redistribution of the Clann Somhairle imperium.

The fact the two episodes took place at the same time a Norwegian fleet is reported to have ravaged the Hebrides could indicate that there was some sort of correlation between these events. For example, it is possible that the Clann Somhairle civil-warring was capitalised upon by these sea-borne interlopers. In fact, one of the leaders of the Norwegian contingent was Óspakr suðreyski, a man who appears to have been a member of Clann Somhairle.

== Aftermath ==
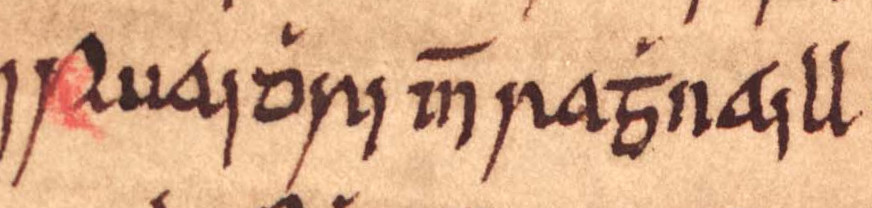
The name of Aonghus' nephew and apparent successor, Ruaidhrí mac Raghnaill, as it appears on folio 63r of Oxford Bodleian Library Rawlinson B 489 (the Annals of Ulster).

In the second decade of the century, the Chronicle of Mann reveals that the wife of the reigning representative of the Crovan dynasty, Rǫgnvaldr Guðrøðarson, King of the Isles, was the sister of the bride of Rǫgnvaldr's rival half-brother, Óláfr Guðrøðarson. Although the precise identity of the half-brothers' shared father-in-law is uncertain, the chronicle describes him as a nobleman from Kintyre. This identification suggests that the man was a member of Clann Somhairle, as sources concerning this kindred associate it with Kintyre more than any other region. The half-brother's father-in-law, therefore, may well have been either Raghnall, or Ruaidhrí—both of whom appear to have been styled "Lord of Kintyre" in contemporary sources—or possibly even Domhnall. It is conceivable that Rǫgnvaldr's union dates before 1210, perhaps not long after 1200. The marital alliance appears to have been orchestrated in an effort to patch up relations between Clann Somhairle and the Crovan dynasty. It is possible that Rǫgnvaldr's kingship was formally recognised by Ruaidhrí as the principal member of Clann Somhairle, and that Ruaidhrí thereby established himself as a leading magnate within a reunified Kingdom of the Isles. Such a development may have taken place at about the time of Aonghus' elimination.

Ruaidhrí was the eponymous ancestor of Clann Ruaidhrí. Although it is possible that Ruaidhrí controlled the lands that made up Garmoran and various islands in the Hebrides, there is uncertainty as to how and when these territories entered into the possession of his family. Later leading members of Clann Ruaidhrí certainly possessed these lands, but evidence of custody before the mid thirteenth century is lacking. One possibility—amongst several—is that Ruaidhrí gained Garmoran in the aftermath of the annihilation of Aonghus' line.

== Ancestry ==
Ancestors of Aonghus mac Somhairle

8. Giolla Adhamhnáin (Note: There are numerous pedigrees outlining the patrilineal ancestry of Somhairle's descendants. Although these pedigrees take the Somhairle's line several generations further back than Giolla Adhamhnáin, the successive names become more unusual, and the pedigrees begin to contradict each other. Consequently, Giolla Adhamhnáin may be the furthest the patrilineal line can be taken back with confidence. The patronym accorded to Somhairle by the Annals of Tigernach refers to Giolla Brighde, whilst the patronym accorded to Somhairle by the Annals of Ulster refers to Giolla Adhamhnáin. Together with the evidence of Bethóc's inscribed tombstone (which also names Giolla Brighde), these sources appear to corroborate the identities of Somhairle's father and grandfather.)
4. Giolla Brighde mac Giolla Adhamhnáin
2. Somhairle mac Giolla Brighde (died 1164)
1. Aonghus mac Somhairle
12. Guðrøðr Crovan (died 1095) (Note: The familial origins of Guðrøðr Crovan are uncertain.)
6. Óláfr Guðrøðarson (died 1153)
3. Ragnhildr Óláfsdóttir
7. uncertain (Note: There is reason to suspect that Ragnhildr's mother was Ingibjǫrg, daughter of Páll Hákonarson, Earl of Orkney.)
