= Battle of Epiphany =

1156 battle off the coast of Scotland

Date	5–6 or 12 January 1156
Location	south of Islay, Scotland
Result	Partition of Kingdom of Mann and the Isles

Belligerents
Forces of Somerled	Forces of Godred Olafsson

Strength
80 Galleys	Unknown

Casualties and losses
Unknown	Unknown

The Battle of Epiphany was a naval battle fought on 5–6 January or 12 January 1156, between the Norse Godred Olafsson (Godred the Black), King of the Isles and the Norse-Gaelic Somhairle MacGillebride (Somerled), King of Cinn Tìre (Kintyre), Argyll and Lorne, off the coast of Islay, Scotland.

== Background ==
Olafr Godredsson, King of the Isles, was murdered on 29 June 1153 by his nephews and his son Godred became king in his place. After ascending to the throne, Godred ruled with a heavy hand, which upset some of his chiefs. Somerled who had married Raghnailt, the daughter of Olafr, was approached by a number of men headed by Thornfinn Ottarsson. Somerled agreed to their plan to overthrow Godred and replace him with Somerled's son Dubgall mac Somairle. He began preparations and began construction of 80 ships modelled on the Norse longship, known as birlinns and nyvaigs (the latter being the first ship to have a stern rudder directly in the rear of the vessel). Somerled having recognised the importance of dominating the sea, with which the Norse had successfully conquered the Isles.

== Battle ==
Thornfinn and Dubgall were sailing around the Isles seeking fealty for the latter as the next king. Godred became aware of their treachery and he sailed his fleet to attack.

The fleets of Godred and Somerled met off Islay, to the north at Rubh' a' Mhaoil, on the night of the Epiphany on 5–6 January or 12 January 1156, and a fierce battle continued through into the next day. A stalemate occurred between the two fleets and Godred and Somerled initiated talks. The contemporary evidence for the location of the battle is slight and some authors have suggested the battle took place to the west of Islay, although Marsden (2008) favours the narrow Sound of Islay.

== Aftermath ==
After discussions and agreement, Godred ceded the isles to the south of Ardnamurchan (Mull, Jura and Islay) to Somerled, while keeping the Outer Hebrides, Skye and the Isle of Man. The Chronicle of Mann and the Sudreys lamented that "thus was the Kingdom of the Isles ruined".

== See also ==
- King of Mann and the Isles
- Kingdom of Mann and the Isles
