= Mac Scelling =

12th century Irish military commander

- Mac Scelling's name as it appears on folio 504r of Dublin Royal Irish Academy C iii 3 (the Annals of the Four Masters).

Mac Scelling (fl. 1154 – 1173/1174), also known as Mac Scilling, was a prominent twelfth-century military commander engaged in conflicts throughout Ireland. He is first recorded in 1154 commanding the maritime forces of Muirchertach Mac Lochlainn, king of the Cenél nEógain, in a bloody encounter against Toirrdelbach Ua Conchobair, king of Connacht. Muirchertach's naval forces were drawn from the western peripheries of Scotland and the Isles. He next appears on record in 1173/1174, supporting the cause of Ruaidrí Ua Conchobair, king of Connacht against the English colonisation of Mide. An early modern Scottish source claims that a man of the same name was a bastard son of Somairle mac Gilla Brigte, king of the Isles. If Mac Scelling was indeed related to Somairle, this relationship could cast light on the latter's conflict with the subsequent king, Guðrøðr Óláfsson, a man who appears to have opposed Muirchertach at some point in his career. Although not termed so in contemporary sources, Mac Scelling may be regarded as an early archetype of later gallowglasses, heavily armed Scottish mercenaries recruited by Irish rulers in centuries that followed.

== In the service of the Meic Lochlainn ==
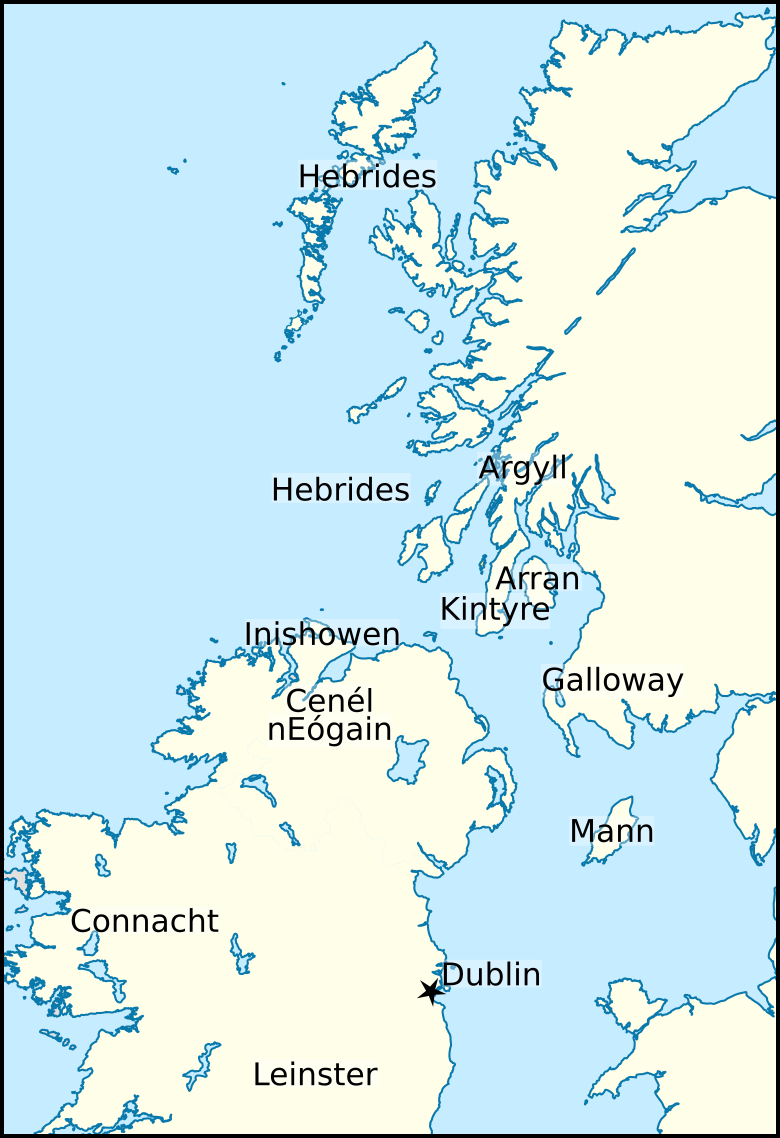
Locations relating to Mac Scelling's life and times.

Midway through the twelfth-century, Muirchertach Mac Lochlainn, king of the Cenél nEógain, pressed forth to claim to the high-kingship of Ireland, an office then held by elderly Toirrdelbach Ua Conchobair, king of Connacht. In 1150, Muirchertach invaded Connacht, and succeeded in gaining hostages from the kingdom. Although Muirchertach and Toirrdelbach made peace the following year, their forces clashed the year after that, with Muirchertach's defeat of Toirrdelbach's son, Ruaidrí. In 1154, the forces of Toirrdelbach and Muirchertach again met in a major conflict fought off the Inishowen coast, in what was perhaps one of the greatest naval battles of the twelfth century. The engagement is briefly recorded by the fourteenth-century Annals of Tigernach, and expanded upon by the seventeenth-century Annals of the Four Masters. According to the latter source, Muirchertach's maritime forces were mercenaries drawn from Galloway, Arran, Kintyre, Mann, and "the territories of Scotland". (Note: An alternate possibility is that the annal does not refer to Galloway at all, and that it actually refers to the Gall Gaidheil of Arran, Kintyre, Mann, and the territory of Scotland.) The annal-entry further reveals that Mac Scelling himself commanded Muirchertach's forces, and that his teeth were knocked out in the affair. Although Toirrdelbach's forces obtained a narrow victory, his northern maritime power seems to have been virtually nullified by the severity of the contest, and Muirchertach soon after marched on Connacht, Bréifne, and Dublin. As a result of the Dubliners' resulting submission, Muirchertach effectively secured himself the high-kingship. There is reason to suspect that Muirchertach's use of foreign warriors—including Mac Scelling himself—strongly influenced the composition of Cath Ruis na Ríg for Bóinn, a twelfth-century Gaelic text that forms a sequel to the epic Táin Bó Cúailgne.

== An apparent Meic Somairle namesake ==
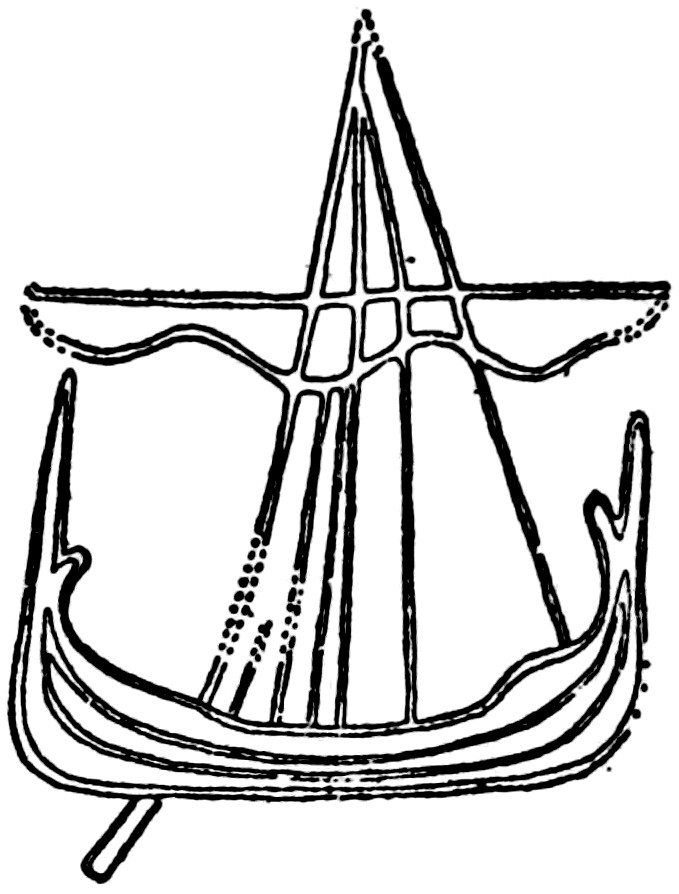
Detail from Maughold IV, a Manx runestone displaying a contemporary sailing vessel. The power of the kings of the Isles, laid in their armed galley-fleets.

Mac Scelling's identity and origins are unknown. (Note: It is possible that Mac Scelling was related to a certain "Patricii McScilling" / "Pat. Macscillingis", the earliest known holder of the lands of Kilcolmkill in Kintyre. This man is attested by royal confirmations dating to 1325 and 1451, which record that he, and his wife "Finlach", granted away the church of Kilcolmkill to the monks of the monastery of Whithorn in Galloway.) His name is similar to that of "Gall mac Sgillin", an apparent foster son or bastard son of Somairle mac Gilla Brigte, Lord of Argyll noted by the eighteenth-century Book of Clanranald. Somairle was a brother-in-law of Guðrøðr Óláfsson, King of the Isles, a man who succeeded to the kingship of the Isles after the death of his father in 1153. Within a few years, Somairle and Guðrøðr fought for control of the Kingdom of the Isles. Although Somairle succeeded in ousting Guðrøðr, he himself was dead within a decade, and Guðrøðr regained the throne.

If Mac Scelling was indeed a member of the Meic Somairle—the descendants of Somairle—this relationship may cast light upon Somairle's struggles in the Isles. For instance, Mac Scelling's cooperation with Muirchertach could be evidence that Guðrøðr faced united opposition from Somairle and Muirchertach. In fact, there is evidence indicating that Guðrøðr and Muirchertach were indeed at odds at some point in the 1150s or 1160s, as the former appears to have briefly gained the kingship of Dublin at the expense of Muirchertach's authority as overlord.

It is also possible that the battle took place before Somairle and Guðrøðr struggled for the kingship. Guðrøðr is otherwise known to have married a granddaughter of Muirchertach, and seems to have had an earlier marriage to another member of the Uí Néill. These marital unions could be evidence of an alliance between Guðrøðr and Muirchertach in the 1150s. Mac Scelling's participation in Muirchertach's service, therefore, could have been undertaken during a period of cooperation between the Isles and the Uí Néill. Nevertheless, an alliance between Somairle and Muirchertach may be perceptible as late as 1164, when the former lost his life leading an invasion of mainland Scotland. According to the fifteenth- to sixteenth-century Annals of Ulster, Somairle commanded troops from Dublin, a settlement which have recognised Muirchertach's overlordship at the time. If Somairle and Muirchertach were indeed assisting each other in 1154 and 1164, the latter episode could well have seen Muirchertach return the favour of earlier support.

== In the service of the Uí Conchobair ==
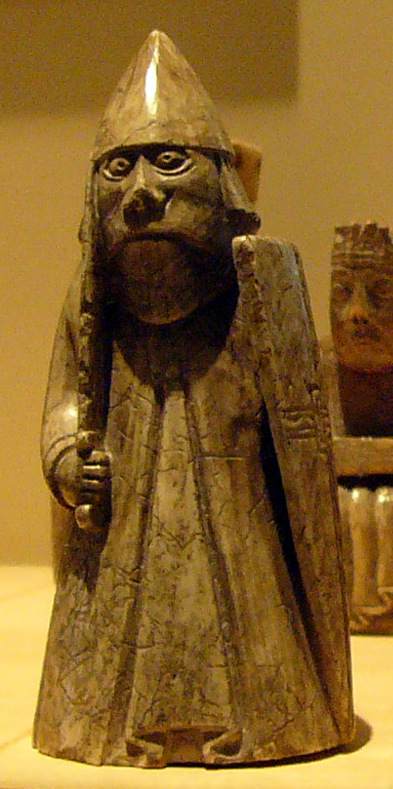
A rook gaming piece of the so-called Lewis chessmen. Some of the pieces may have arrived in the Isles as a result of Guðrøðr's connections with Norway. The Scandinavian connections of leading members of the Isles may have been reflected in their military armament, and could have resembled that depicted upon such gaming pieces.

In the last third of the twelfth century, Diarmait Mac Murchada, King of Leinster was deposed and driven from Ireland by his rivals. He subsequently enlisted the aid of English mercenaries and launched an invasion of Ireland. In 1170, the combined forces of Diarmait and Richard fitz Gilbert de Clare, Earl of Pembroke conquered Dublin. The following year, the aforesaid Ruaidrí, who was then the reigning High King of Ireland and King of Connacht, along with Lorcán Ua Tuathail, Archbishop of Dublin, appealed to Guðrøðr for military assistance from the Isles. Although Ruaidrí besieged the town by land, whilst Guðrøðr blockaded it by sea, Dublin remained firmly in English hands. Within the year, Henry II, King of England arrived in Ireland and consolidated English control. One of the few provincial kings who refused to submit to Henry was Ruaidrí himself; and in 1173 or 1174, he assembled a massive host from northern Ireland in campaign to bring a halt to the English colonisation of Mide. According to the twelfth- to thirteenth-century La Geste des Engleis en Yrlande, one of the numerous rulers who rallied to Ruaidrí's cause was Mac Scelling himself. This source further states that Ruaidrí enlisted support not only support from Leath Cuinn—a reference to northern Ireland—but also from "les Norreys" and "les Norreis"—two terms that may refer to Norsemen. La Geste des Engleis en Yrlande, therefore, appears to indicate that Ruaidrí indeed received support from the Hebrides.

== Archetypical gallowglass ==
The little that is known of Mac Scelling suggests that he was an early archetype of what latter became known as gallowglasses, heavily armed mercenaries, recruited from the West Highlands and Islands of Scotland by Irish rulers in later centuries. Although first specifically recorded in the last decade of the thirteenth century, gallowglasses were almost certainly utilised at least a generation before. The aforesaid apparent reference to Mac Scelling by La Geste des Engleis en Yrlande could be evidence that he had taken up residence in Ireland like later gallowglasses.
