= Ragnhildis Olafsdottir =

Wife of Norse-Gael king in 12th century

- The name Ragnhildr, as it appears on the Flateyarbók: "Ragnhilldi".
- Born: est. 1115
- Died: uncertain
- Spouse: Somerled (m. 1140)
- Issue: Dubgall, Ragnall, Aonghas
- House: Crovan Dynasty (Uí Ímair)
- Father: Óláfr Guðrøðarson
- Mother: Ingibiorg Hakonsdottir of Orkney

Ragnhildis Olafsdottir, also known as Ragnhild, (c.1115 - unknown) was the daughter of king Óláfr Guðrøðarson of the Kingdom of Mann and Ingibiorg Hakonsdottir, making her a granddaughter of Haakon Paulsson.

Ragnhild married the Norse-Gaelic lord Somerled, king of the Kingdom of the Isles. As the mother of Dubgall, Ragnall, and Aonghas, Ragnhild was the progenitor of Clann Somhairle and the ancestor of Clan MacDonald, Clan MacDougall, Clan MacAlister, and many other clans. Little is known about her life apart from her marriage to Somerled and her being a part of the royal lineage of the Crovan Dynasty.

== Legacy ==
Ragnhild is important to Clann Somhairle because she gives the clan and its descendants royal status on the basis of their descent from the Crovan Dynasty and the Uí Ímair Dynasty, because her father Óláfr Guðrøðarson was the son of Godred Crovan. This is one of the ways in which Somerled's expansion is politically legitimised. Ragnhild's place in Manx dynastic politics also strengthened claims by further descendants.

Historian R. Andrew Macdonald recounts how the Chronicles of Mann describes how the wife of Somerled was the "cause of the collapse of the entire kingdom of the Isles" because the kingdom would fall under the control of Clann Somhairle and would become divided which ultimately led to its collapse in the mid 13th century.

== Fictional depiction ==
Ragnhild was an important character in the novel Summer Warrior by Regan Walker.

== See also ==
- List of Manx royal consorts
- British nobility
- Irish nobility
