= Battle of the Isle of Man =

1158 battle on the Isle of Man

Coordinates: 54.3222°N 4.3867°W

Battle of Isle of Man
| Date | 1158 |
| Location | Isle of Man |
| Result | Seizure of Kingdom of Mann and the Isles |

Belligerents
| Somhairle MacGillebride | Gofraidh mac Amhlaibh |

Strength
| 53 birlinns | Unknown |

Casualties and losses
| Unknown | Unknown |

The Battle of the Isle of Man was fought in 1158 between the Norse Gofraidh mac Amhlaibh (Godred II), King of Mann and the Isles and Celtic Somhairle MacGillebride (Somerled), King of Cinn Tìre (Kintyre), Argyll and Lorne, on the Isle of Man.

Somerled sailed his fleet of 53 birlinns into Ramsey Bay and set about attacking the forces of Godred II and plundering the Isle of Man. Godred II left the Isle of Man and went in search of support in England, Scotland and Norway to retaliate against Somerled.

As a result of the victory, Somerled seized the Kingdom of Mann and the Isles for himself. He paid a visit to Norway in 1069 and visited Inge, the King of Norway obtaining confirmation of the right to King of Mann and the Isles. Somerled held the title until his death in 1164 at the battle of Renfrew, whereupon Godred II was reinstated as the King of Mann and the Isles.

== See also ==
- King of Mann and the Isles
- Kingdom of Mann and the Isles
