= Clann Somhairle =

Scottish clan

House of Somerled
- Founder: Somerled
- Titles: King of Mann and the Isles; King of Kintyre; Lord of the Isles; Lord of Argyll/Lorne; Lord of Islay; Earl of Ross; Earl of Antrim
- Cadet branches: Clan MacDougall; Clan Donald; Clann Ruaidhrí

Clann Somhairle, sometimes anglicised as Clan Sorley, /ˌklæn ˈsɔːrli/ refers to those Scottish and Irish dynasties descending from the famous Norse-Gaelic leader Somerled, King of Mann and the Isles, son of Gillabrigte (†1164), and ancestor of Clann Domhnaill. Primarily they are the Clan Donald, and Clan MacDougall and all their numerous branches. Clan Macruari are their lost sept. They are formerly known as the Lord of the Isles. Clan Donald played a significant role in the decline of Norse-Gaelic influence.

== Origins ==
The origin of Somerled, from whom the clan derives, is obscure. Only the name of his father is directly attested in early records. He was later portrayed as having Gaelic ancestry, with late pedigrees from the 14th and 15th century tracing him from legendary Colla Uais and hence from Conn of the Hundred Battles, and some versions apparently including the legendary founder of the Scottish state of Dál Riata, Fergus Mór. Historians have distrusted this derivation, though in the 1960s, David Sellar defended a Gaelic derivation. More recently, historian Alex Woolf has pointed out the conflicting information found in the different versions of the pedigree and drawn attention to their faulty chronology. Instead he argues that these pedigrees may derive from an original claim to the descent of Somerled from the Crovan dynasty and the Uí Ímair, subsequently obscured by alterations made to link them to the Scottish and Irish foundation legends. In any case, the Clann Somhairle based their claim to the Isles on their descent from Somerled's wife, Ragnhildr, the daughter of king Amlaíb Derg, and Woolf accepts that the male-line Crovan descent claim underlying the pedigrees may have arisen as a replacement for this female-line derivation from the family. Sir Iain Moncreiffe attempted to reconstruct a male line descent from Somerled back to Echmarcach mac Ragnaill, King of the Isles, but this has received little attention.

The Orkneyinga saga refers to Somerled having "dominion in Dalr" and records that his family are known as the Dalverjar—literally "dale-dwellers". W. F. Skene suggested that although the words have quite different meanings that this name was linked to the earlier pre-Norse kingdom of Dál Riata.

== Clan Gothofred ==
Donald Monro's 1549 Description of the Western Isles of Scotland offers a brief description of the five main branches of Clan Donald that existed in his day under the title "Heir Followis The Genealogies Of The Chieff Clans Of The Iles". Monro also states that in earlier days the House was known as "Clan Gothofred".

This Somerle wes the sone of Gillebryde M'Gilleadam, name Vic Sella, Vic Mearshaighe, Vic Swyffine, Vic Malgheussa, Vic Eacime, Vic Gothefred, fra quhome they were called at that time Clan Gothofred, that is, Clan Gotheray in Hybers Leid, and they were very grate men in that tymes zeire. (Translation from Scots: This Somerled was the son of Gillebryde M'Gilleadam, son of Sella, son of Mearshaighe, son of Swyffine, son of Malgheussa, son of Eacime, son of Gothefred, from whom they were called at that time Clan Gothofred, that is, Clan Gotheray in the Gaelic language, and they were very great men in those times.)

The name "Gofraid" also appears in numerous other versions of Somerled's ancestry.

Similarly, a poetic address to Aonghus of Islay describes Clann Somairle as having "sprung from Síol nGofraidh" (the seed of Gofraid) and a recently rediscovered poem from a 17th-century manuscript written by Niall MacMhuirich addressed to Domhnall mac Raghnaill, Rosg Mall (i.e. "Domhnall mac Raghnaill, of the Stately Gaze") has the line:

Ó Ghothfruigh ó hÁmhlaibh Fhinn,	Descendant of Gofraidh, descendant of Amhlaibh Fionn

"Amhlaibh Fionn" ("Olaf the White") may be Amlaíb Conung the 9th century Norse–Gael son of the king of Lochlann. Various suggestions have been offered as to which of the possible Gofraid's these texts may have referred to, including Godred Crovan, Gofraid ua Ímair and Gofraid mac Fergusa. (Note: Although not, for some reason, Gofraid of Lochlann, presumed father of Amlaíb.)

== See also ==
- Sorley Boy MacDonnell
- Irish nobility
- British nobility
- List of haplogroups of historical and famous figures
