= Ragnall mac Gofraid =

King of the Isles (died 1004/1005)

- King of the Isles
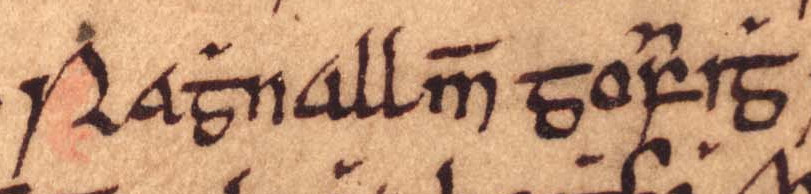
- Ragnall's name as it appears on folio 35r of Oxford Bodleian Library Rawlinson B 489 (the Annals of Ulster).
- Predecessor: Gofraid mac Arailt
- Died: 1004 or 1005; Munster
- Issue: Echmarcach?, Cacht?, Amlaíb?
- House: probably Uí Ímair
- Father: Gofraid mac Arailt

Ragnall mac Gofraid (died 1004/1005) was King of the Isles and likely a member of the Uí Ímair kindred. (Note: Since the 1980s, academics have accorded Ragnall various personal names in English secondary sources: Ragnald, Ragnaldr, Raghnall, Ragnall, Ranald, Røgnvaldr, Ro̧gnvaldr, Rǫgnvaldr, Ronald, and Rögnvaldr, Likewise, since the 1980s, academics have accorded Ragnall various patronyms in English secondary sources: Raghnall mac Gothraidh, Ragnall Godfreysson, Ragnall Godredsson, Ragnall Guðrøðsson, Ragnall mac Gofraid meic Arailt, Ragnall mac Gofraid, Ragnall mac Gofraidh, Rögnvaldr Guðrøðarson, Røgnvaldr Guðrøðsson, Rögnvaldr Guðrøðsson, and Ronald Gothfrithsson.) He was a son of Gofraid mac Arailt, King of the Isles. Ragnall and Gofraid flourished at a time when the Kingdom of the Isles seems to have suffered from Orcadian encroachment at the hands of Sigurðr Hlǫðvisson, Earl of Orkney. Gofraid died in 989. Although Ragnall is accorded the kingship upon his own death in 1004 or 1005, the succession after his father's death is uncertain.

During his career, Ragnall may have contended with Gilli, an apparent Hebridean rival who was closely aligned with Sigurðr. Another possible opponent of Ragnall may have been Sveinn Haraldsson, King of Denmark who attacked Mann in 955. This man is recorded to have been exiled from Scandinavia at one point in his career, and to have found shelter with a certain "rex Scothorum", a monarch that could refer to Ragnall himself. Whatever the case, Mann also fell prey to Æthelræd II, King of the English in 1000. Both military operations may have been the retaliation.

The circumstances surrounding Ragnall's death in Munster are unknown. On one hand it is possible that he had been exiled from the Isles at the time of his demise. Another possibility is that he had—or was in the process of—forming an alliance with Brian Bóruma mac Cennétig, King of Munster, a man who seems to have held an alliance with Ragnall's father. On possibility is that Ragnall sought assistance from Briain after having been forced from the Isles by Orcadian military might. A power vacuum resulting from Ragnall's demise may partly account from the remarkable English invasion of England by Máel Coluim mac Cináeda, King of Alba.

At about the same time as Ragnall's death, Brian occupied the high kingship of Ireland, and there is evidence to suggest that the latter's authority stretched into the Irish Sea region and northern Britain. Not long afterwards, an apparent brother of Ragnall, Lagmann mac Gofraid, is attested on the Continent, a fact which might be evidence that this man had been ejected from the Isles by Brian. An apparent son Lagmann was slain in battle against Brian's forces in 1014. The lack of a suitable native candidate to reign in the Isles may have led to the region falling under the royal authority of the Norwegian Hákon Eiríksson. The latter's death in 1029 or 1030 may have likewise contributed to the rise Echmarcach mac Ragnaill, King of Dublin and the Isles, a possible son of Ragnall. Other children of Ragnall could include Cacht ingen Ragnaill, and the father of Gofraid mac Amlaíb meic Ragnaill, King of Dublin.

== King of the Isles ==
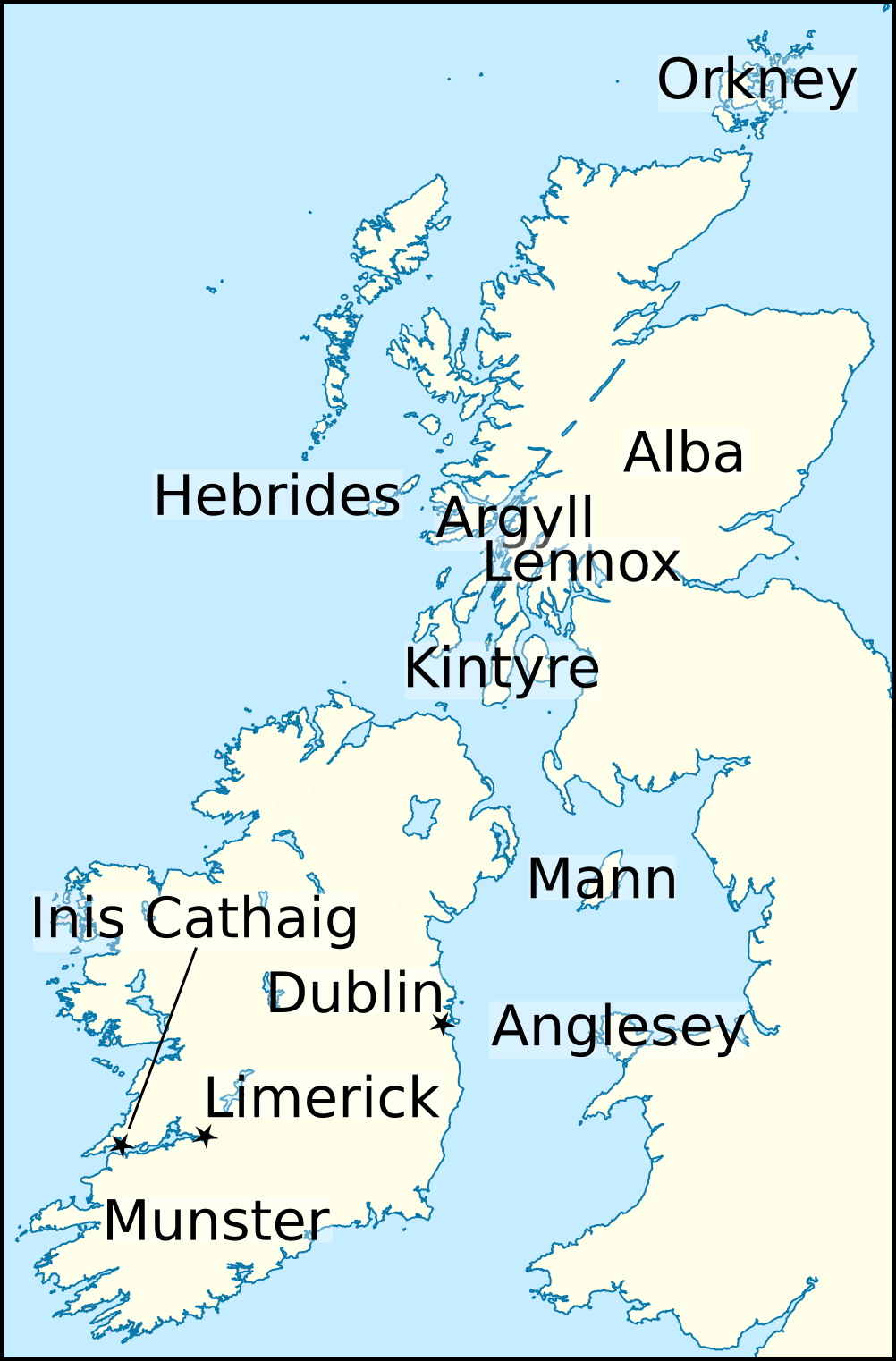
Locations relating to Ragnall's life and times.

Ragnall was a son of Gofraid mac Arailt, King of the Isles. Ragnall belonged to the Meic Arailt, a family named after his paternal grandfather, Aralt. The latter's identity is uncertain, although he may well have been a member of the Uí Ímair kindred. (Note: Gofraid's father appears to have been Aralt mac Sitriuc, King of Limerick, great-grandson of the eponymous ancestor of the Uí Ímair. An alternate possibility is that Gofraid's father was Hagroldus, a Danish chieftain from Normandy, unrelated to the Uí Ímair.) From at least 972 to 989 Gofraid actively campaigned in the Irish Sea region, after which the political cohesion of Kingdom of the Isles—perhaps shaken by Orcadian encroachment in the 980s—seems to have diminished.

There is evidence to suggest that Sigurðr Hlǫðvisson, Earl of Orkney extended his authority from Orkney into the Isles in the late tenth- and early eleventh century. According to various Scandinavian sources, Sigurðr oversaw numerous raids into the Isles during his career. For instance, the thirteenth-century Njáls saga states that one of Sigurðr's followers, Kári Sǫlmundarson, extracted taxes from the northern Hebrides, then controlled by a Hebridean earl named Gilli. Also noted are additional assaults conducted by accomplices of Sigurðr throughout the Hebrides, Kintyre, Mann, and Anglesey. The thirteenth-century Orkneyinga saga makes note of Sigurðr's raids into the Hebrides, whilst the thirteenth-century Eyrbyggja saga states that his forces reached as far as Mann where he collected taxation.

Silver coin hoards and mixed hoards found in regions of Scandinavian Scotland and Mann. The second highest peak, during about 1000, dates to about the apogee of Sigurðr Hlǫðvisson's authority.

The extent of Gofraid's own authority in the Hebrides is unknown due to his apparent coexistence with Gilli, and to the uncertainty of Orcadian encroachment. Gofraid's successor is likewise uncertain. On one hand, he may have been succeeded by Ragnall himself. Although it is conceivable that either Gilli or Sigurðr capitalised on Gofraid's death, and extended their overlordship as far south as Mann, possible after-effects such as these are uncorroborated. Although it is possible that Gilli controlled the Hebrides whilst Gofraid ruled Mann, the title accorded to the latter on his death could indicate otherwise. If so, the chronology of Gilli's subordination to Sigurðr may actually date to the period after Ragnall's death in 1004/1005. Little is certain of Ragnall's reign. Certainly, he was accorded the kingship of the Isles by the time of his death, and it is possible that he faced opposition from Sigurðr during his career.

Njáls saga specifically states that the latter and his men overcame a king on Mann named Gofraid after which they plundered the Isles. Whilst this royal figure may well refer to Ragnall's father, another possibility is that source actually refers to Ragnall himself. Contemporary Orcadian expansion may be perceptible in the evidence of the land-assessment system of ouncelands in the Hebrides and along the western coast of Scotland. If Sigurðr's authority indeed stretched over the Isles in the last decades of the tenth century, such an intrusion could account for the numbers of silver hoards dating to this time. The remarkable proportion of silver hoards from Mann and the Scandinavian regions of Scotland that date to about 1000 seem to reflect the wealth of Sigurðr's domain at about the apogee of his authority. The hoards from Argyll that date to this period could be indicative of conflict between Sigurðr and Ragnall.

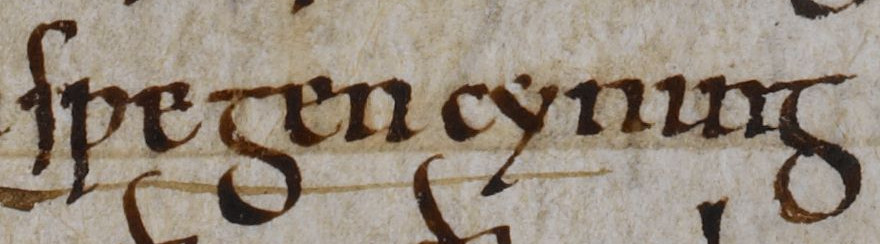
The name and title of Sveinn Haraldsson as it appears on folio 151r of British Library Cotton Tiberius B I (the "C" version of the Anglo-Saxon Chronicle): "Swegen cyning".

At some point in the decade following Gofraid's demise, Sveinn Haraldsson, King of Denmark was forced from his own realm. According to Gesta Hammaburgensis ecclesiae pontificum by Adam of Bremen, Sveinn fled to Æthelræd II, King of the English, before he found shelter with a certain "rex Scothorum". Whilst this unnamed monarch could be identical to the reigning Cináed mac Maíl Choluim, King of Alba, the term Scoti can refer to the Irish just as well as the Scots. Adam is otherwise known to have been less than well-informed of affairs in Britain, and it is possible that was confused as to the king's true identity. For instance, Adam may well have referred to a Scottish, Irish, Cumbrian, or Norse-Gaelic monarch. In fact, Ragnall's position of power in the Irish Sea could well have led Adam to regard him as an Irish royal. In 995, the "B" version of the eleventh- to thirteenth-century Annales Cambriæ, the thirteenth- and fourteenth-century texts Brenhinedd y Saesson and Brut y Tywysogyon, report that Mann suffered an invasion from Sveinn. One possibility is that this assault was directed at the Uí Ímair. Certainly, Ragnall does not appear to have achieved the same level of success as his father, whilst Sveinn's invasion coincided with a bitter struggle for Dublin between Ímar, King of Waterford and Sitriuc mac Amlaíb, King of Dublin—strife amongst the Uí Ímair that was also capitalised upon by Máel Sechnaill mac Domnaill, King of Mide within the year.

== Death ==
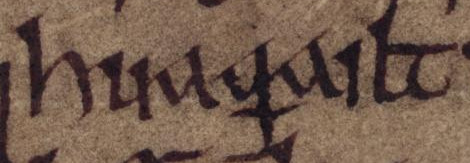
Ragnall's name as it appears on folio 20r of Oxford Bodleian Library Rawlinson B 503 (the Annals of Inisfallen): ("h-ua Arailt"). The name identifies him as a grandson of Aralt.

In 1004 or 1005, Ragnall died in Munster. His death is recorded by the eleventh- to fourteenth-century Annals of Inisfallen, the fifteenth- to sixteenth-century Annals of Ulster, and the twelfth-century Chronicon Scotorum. The circumstances surrounding Ragnall's demise are uncertain. One possibility is that he was attempting to take control of Limerick. Another possibility is that he may have been exiled from the Isles, which could account for the fact that no military engagement is associated with his obituaries.

The name Sigurðr Hlǫðvisson as it appears on folio 12v of AM 45 fol (Codex Frisianus): "Sigvrðr Loðvisson".

Alternately, the record of Ragnall's death in Munster could indicate that he was attempting form an alliance with Brian Bóruma mac Cennétig, King of Munster. In 1005, at about the time of Ragnall's death, Brian is styled imperator Scottorum ("emperor of the Scotti") by the ninth-century Book of Armagh. (Note: Other translations of this Latin title are: "Emperor of the Gaels", "emperor of the Gaels", "emperor of the Goídil", "emperor of the Irish", "Emperor of the Irish", "Emperor of the Scoti", "Emperor of the Scoti", "emperor of the Scots", and "emperor of the Scotti".) This title could be indicative of claims of authority over not only the Irish, but also the Scandinavians of Ireland and the Isles, and the Gaels of Alba. As such, it could reveal that Brian indeed came to an accommodation with Ragnall and at least some other Islesmen. (Note: Also in 1005, the Annals of Ulster describes Brian co rigraidh Erenn ("accompanied by the royalty of Ireland"). As a result of the apparent weakness of Ragnall's position in the Isles, it is possible that he was one of the subordinate royals in Brian's retinue.) If so, such an aligned by Ragnall may have been undertaken in the context of countering the encroachment of Sigurðr's influence into the Isles. Whether Ragnall was subdued by Brian or merely formed an alliance with him, a possible aftereffect of Brian's apparent extension into the Isles may have been Sveinn's campaigning in the region, a venture possibly undertaken in an effort to offset Brian's influence.

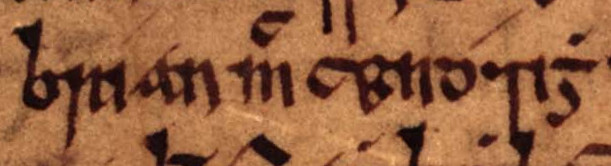
The name of Brian Bóruma mac Cennétig as it appears on folio 15r of Oxford Bodleian Library Rawlinson B 488 (the Annals of Tigernach): ("Brian mac Cendéidigh").

There is evidence to suggest that Ragnall's family indeed held an alliance with Brian and his family. In 974, for example, Gofraid's brother, Maccus, is recorded to have attacked the monastic site of Inis Cathaig, where Ímar, King of Limerick—an apparent foe of Brian's family—was taken prisoner. Explicit evidence of an alliance between Brian's family and the Meic Arailt is preserved by the Annals of Inisfallen which reports that the Meic Arailt rendezvoused with the sons of Brian's father at Waterford in 984, and exchanged hostages with them in an apparent agreement pertaining to military cooperation. This compact seems to indicate that Brian's family sought to align the Vikings of the Isles against those of Dublin.

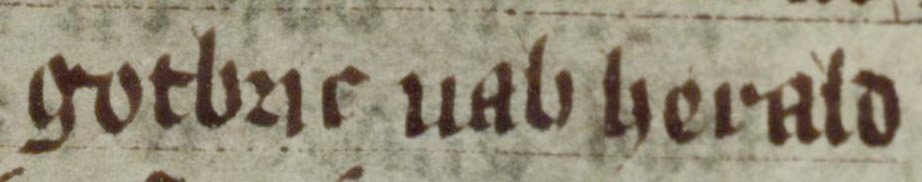
The name of Gofraid mac Arailt as it appears on folio 59r of Oxford Jesus College 111 (the Red Book of Hergest): ("gotbric uab herald").

In 1006, Brian mustered a massive force in southern Ireland and marched throughout the north of the island in a remarkable show of force. A passage preserved by the eleventh- or twelfth-century Cogad Gáedel re Gallaib claims that, whilst in the north, Brian's maritime forces levied tribute from Saxons and Britons, and from Argyll, the Lennox, and Alba. If Brian had indeed patronised Ragnall, the relationship could have been reflected by this passage. Certainly, Ragnall's Meic Aralt predecessors—Maccus and Gofraid—campaigned on Anglesey and in a region identified as Dál Riata. Furthermore, their actions may have precipitated a retaliatory campaign by Æthelræd on Mann in 1000. In consequence, the history of the Meic Aralt, and Ragnall's eventual subservience to Brian, may account for the boasts of Brian's overseas authority. Brian clearly possessed naval forces capable of operating overseas. In 1002, for example, the Annals of Inisfallen states that he campaigned in Ulaid, and was aided by forces drawn from Dublin. Four years later, the same source notes the Dubliner's part in Brian's campaigning against the Ulaid. As such, Brian could well have overseen operations meant to reassert his authority in the Isles and Argyll after Ragnall's demise. (Note: Nevertheless, Cogad Gáedel re Gallaib appears to have been compiled for the benefit of Brian's great-grandson, Muirchertach Ua Briain, High King of Ireland, and it is possible that the boastful passage about Brian's overseas authority is reflective of either Muirchertach's own sphere of influence or his sphere of ambition.)

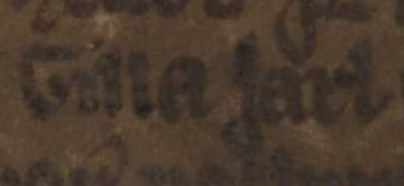
The name and title of Gilli as it appears on folio 4r of AM 162 B epsilon (Njáls saga): "Gilla jarl".

Whilst Ragnall may have been driven from the Isles by Sigurðr's encroachment, it is also possible that it was Ragnall's overseas death—and a resultant power vacuum—that lured Orcadian comital power into the realm. Ragnall's near rival in the Isles may have been Gilli, who could have likewise seized upon Ragnall's death. The elimination of Ragnall from the region could have also been a factor in the remarkable invasion of England by Máel Coluim mac Cináeda, King of Alba in 1006.

An apparent brother of Ragnall was a certain Lagmann mac Gofraid who is attested on the Continent commanding mercenary operations in the following decade. Lagmann's overseas campaigning could reveal that Brian also capitalised upon Ragnall's demise, and forced Lagmann into exile. The fact that the Annals of Ulster describes Brian in 1014 as "over-king of the Gaels of Ireland, and of the Foreigners, and of the Britons" could be evidence that Brian indeed held authority in the Isles, or at least sought to. It is conceivable that such interference could have enticed certain Islesmen to back Sitriuc and the Dubliners against Brian at the Battle of Clontarf that year. In fact, an apparent son of Lagmann, a certain Amlaíb mac Lagmainn, is recorded to have fought and died against Brian's forces at the battle. Amongst the multitude of slain were both Brian and Sigurðr. If Lagmann also died at about this time, the lack of a suitable native candidate to succeed as King of the Isles may account for the record of the region falling under the control of the Norwegian Hákon Eiríksson. Evidence that Knútr installed Hákon as overlord of the Isles may be preserved by the twelfth-century Ágrip af Nóregskonungasǫgum, which states that Hákon had been sent into the Isles by Óláfr Haraldsson, King of Norway, and that Hákon ruled the region for the rest of his life. (Note: The historicity of this event is nevertheless uncertain, and Hákon's authority in the Isles is not attested by any other source.)

== Possible descendants ==
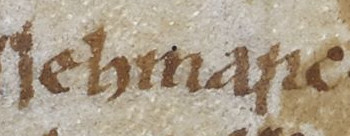
The name of Echmarcach mac Ragnaill as it appears on folio 67r of British Library Cotton Domitian A VIII (the "F" version of the Anglo-Saxon Chronicle): "Iehmarc".

Ragnall may have been the father of Echmarcach mac Ragnaill, King of Dublin and the Isles. Other possible parents of this Norse-Gaelic monarch include two like-named rulers of Waterford: Ragnall mac Ímair, King of Waterford, and this man's apparent son, Ragnall ua Ímair, King of Waterford. Echmarcach appears to first emerge in the historical record in the first half of the eleventh century when the ninth- to twelfth-century Anglo-Saxon Chronicle reveals that he was one of the three kings who met with Knútr Sveinnsson, ruler of the North Sea Empire comprising the kingdoms of Denmark, England, and Norway. This source's record of Echmarcach in company with Máel Coluim and Mac Bethad mac Findlaích—the two other named kings—could indicate that he was in some sense a 'Scottish' ruler, and that his powerbase was located in the Isles. Such an orientation could add weight to the possibility that Echmarcach was descended from Ragnall. (Note: In 1005, Máel Coluim succeeded a kinsman to become King of Alba. The twelfth-century pseudo-prophetic Prophecy of Berchán describes this monarch as an "enemy of Britons", and within the same passage seems to refer to military actions against the islands of Islay and Arran. If correct, this source could be evidence of competition in the region between Brian and his Scottish counterpart. On the other hand, there is a possibility that this source instead refers the flight of Máel Coluim from Alba into the Isles. If such an act took indeed occurred, it would appear to have been before Máel Coluim's accession in 1005, and perhaps during Ragnall's reign in the Isles.) If Hákon had indeed possessed overlordship of the Isles, his eventual demise in 1029 or 1030 may well have paved the way for Echmarcach's own rise to power.

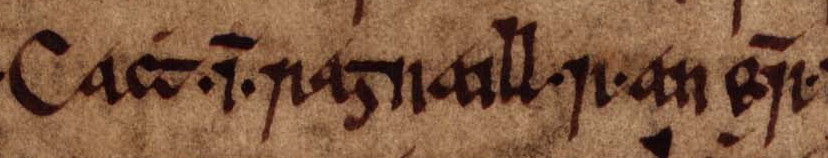
The name and title of Cacht ingen Ragnaill as they appear on folio 18r of Oxford Bodleian Library Rawlinson B 488: ("Cacht ingen Ragnaill, rígan Erenn"). This source styles Cacht "Queen of Ireland",

There is evidence to suggest that Ragnall had a daughter who married into the Uí Briain. Specifically, in 1032, the Annals of Inisfallen states that Donnchad mac Briain, King of Munster married the daughter of a certain Ragnall, adding: "hence the saying: 'the spring of Ragnall's daughter'". Upon her death about two decades later, the Annals of Tigernach identifies this woman as Cacht ingen Ragnaill, and styles her Queen of Ireland. Like Echmarcach himself, Cacht's patronym could be evidence that she was a daughter of Ragnall, or a near relation of the like-named men who ruled Waterford.

Ragnall may have also been the paternal grandfather of Gofraid mac Amlaíb meic Ragnaill, King of Dublin. The latter's apparent father, Amlaíb, could well have been the father of Sitriuc mac Amlaíb, a man whose fall in an attack on Mann with two members of the Uí Briain is recorded by the Annals of Ulster in 1073. Decades afterwards in 1087, the same source relates that two descendants of a certain Ragnall were slain in another invasion of Mann. Whilst Amlaíb may have been the father of these two as well, it is also possible that they were sons of Echmarcach or Gofraid mac Amlaíb meic Ragnaill.

== Citations ==
Ragnall mac Gofraid Uí Ímair Died: 1004/1005
Regnal titles
| Preceded by Gofraid mac Arailt^{1} | King of the Isles ×1004/1005 | Succeeded by Lagmann mac Gofraid^{2} |
Notes and references
1. The succession after Gofraid's death is uncertain. One possibility is that Ragnall succeeded him.; 2. The succession after Ragnall's death is also uncertain. One possibility is that Lagmann reigned as king before being ejected from the Isles.
