= Ásbjǫrn skerjablesi =

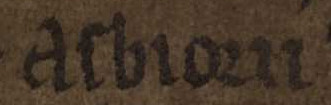
Ásbjǫrn's name as it appears on folio 141v of AM 132 fol (Möðruvallabók): "Asbiorn".

Ásbjǫrn skerjablesi (died 874), also known as Ásbjǫrn jarl skerjablesi, was a ruler of the Hebrides attested by Landnámabók and Droplaugarsona saga. His epithet, skerjablesi, translates to "skerry blaze". One possibility is that this name means "the man with a blaze from the Skerries", although the particular skerry which this might refer to is unknown. Another possibility is that, whilst the word element blesi ("blaze") refers to Ásbjǫrn's nickname, the element sker ("skerry") refers to his hangout. According to Landnámabók, Ásbjǫrn was slain in 874 by Hólmfastr Véþormsson and Grímr (a nephew of Hólmfastr's father). Ásbjǫrn's killers are stated to have enslaved Ásbjǫrn's wife, Álof (daughter of Þórðr vaggagði), and his daughter Arneiðr.

== See also ==
- Gilli (Hebridean earl), a tenth-century Hebridean earl
