= Lagmann mac Gofraid =

Lagmann mac Gofraid may have been an early eleventh-century ruler of the Kingdom of the Isles. (Note: Since the 2000s, academics have accorded Lagmann various personal names in English secondary sources: Lacman, Lagman, Lagmann, Lagmann Godfreysson, and Lagmann Gudrødsson.) He seems to have been a son of Gofraid mac Arailt, King of the Isles, and was likely a member of the Uí Ímair kindred. According to mediaeval sources, Lagmann was closely associated with Óláfr Haraldsson, a future King of Norway. According one source, both men lent assistance to Knútr, son of Sveinn Haraldsson, King of Denmark, although it is possible that this account actually refers to Óláfr's campaigning in England several years beforehand. Lagmann and Óláfr are also recorded to have assisted Richard II, Duke of Normandy. The two are specified to have not only ravaged lands in Brittany on behalf of Richard, but were tasked to counter Richard's opponent Odo II, Count of Chartres. Lagmann's activities on the Continent may have arisen as a result of being forced from the Isles following the death of his possible brother Ragnall mac Gofraid, King of the Isles in 1004 or 1005. Lagmann's son, Amlaíb, is recorded to have perished at the Battle of Clontarf in 1014. If Lagmann died at about this time as well, it could account for the record of Hákon Eiríksson assuming control of the Isles.

== King of the Isles ==
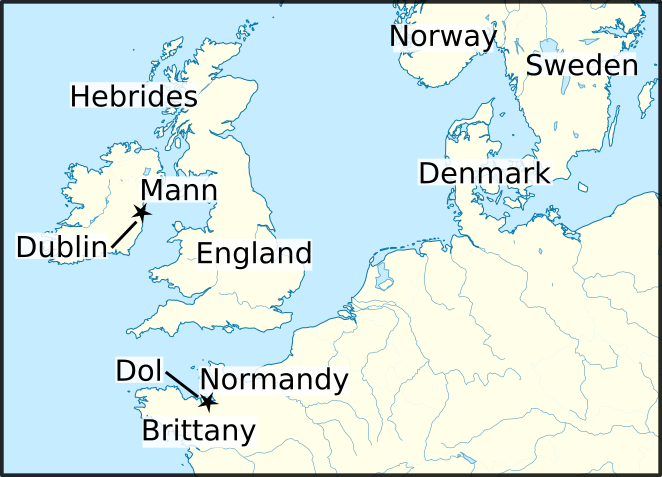
Locations relating to Lagmann's life and times

According to the eleventh-century Gesta Normannorum ducum, Knútr, son of Sveinn Haraldsson, King of Denmark sought military assistance from a king of the Noricorum named Óláfr, and a king of Suauorum named Lacman. Whilst Óláfr seems to be identical to Óláfr Haraldsson, there is otherwise no known Swedish king named Lagmann. In fact, Gesta Normannorum ducum appears to refer to a King of the Isles rather than a King of Sweden, with Suauorum likely being a form of Sudrorum. The Kingdom of the Isles was known in Old Norse as Suðreyjar, a term that means "Southern Islands", in reference to the Hebrides and Mann.

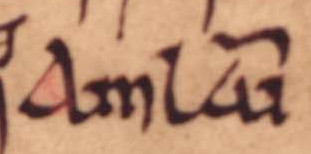
The name of Amlaíb mac Lagmainn, Lagmann's apparent son, as it appears on folio 36v of Oxford Bodleian Library Rawlinson B 489 (the Annals of Ulster).

The Gaelic personal name Lagmann is derived from the Old Norse lǫgmaðr ("lawman"). The latter word originally referred to a profession, and was later adopted as a personal name. Although the name itself is historically found in the Isles as early the tenth century, it is not attested in Scandinavia proper. Corroboration that there was indeed a contemporaneous potentate from the Isles who bore the name is preserved by the fifteenth- to sixteenth-century Annals of Ulster and the eleventh- or twelfth-century Cogad Gáedel re Gallaib. These sources reveal that a prominent Islesmen named Amlaíb, described as the son of Lagmann mac Gofraid, fought and died at the Battle of Clontarf in 1014. The patronym accorded to Lagmann in these sources suggests that his father was Gofraid mac Arailt, King of the Isles, and thus a brother of Ragnall mac Gofraid, King of the Isles. (Note: Another possibility is that Amlaíb's patronym links him with the so-called "Lawmen of the Isles" who are attested in Ireland in the 960s and 970s by the Annals of the Four Masters.) It is conceivable that Lagmann's son led the Hebridean contingent at Clontarf.

Excerpt from folio 80v of GKS 1005 fol (Flateyarbók): "Hringsfirde". The excerpt refers to Hringsfjǫrðr, the location of a battle fought by Óláfr Haraldsson before his apparent sack of the fortress of Dol.

According to the twelfth-century Roman de Rou, and Gesta Normannorum ducum, after Lagmann and Óláfr assisted Knútr, the two were approached by Richard II, Duke of Normandy, who needed aid battling against Odo II, Count of Chartres. Lagmann and Óláfr are also stated to have campaigned on behalf of the Normans against the Bretons in Brittany where the two sacked Dol. (Note: The Vikings' attack on Dol is alluded to by Translatio sancti Maglorii et aliorum Parisius.) It is possible that a record of this ravaging of Dol—and the unidentified coastal site of Hringsfjǫrðr—is preserved by Víkingarvísur, a piece of contemporary praise poetry composed by Sigvatr Þórðarson, extolling battles fought by Óláfr in England, Scandinavia, and on the Continent. In any event, when Robert II, King of the Franks afterwards intervened between the duke and count, Gesta Normannorum ducum records that Lagmann and Óláfr were presented with gifts from the king, and persuaded to return home to their own countries. (Note: Gesta Normannorum ducum is the only non-Scandinavian source to detail Óláfr's early career. There is reason to suspect that this source is partly derived from Sigvatr, who visited Normandy in the 1020s.) The accounts of Lagmann and Óláfr suggest that they were sea-kings, the royal commanders of Viking fleets that sought out plunder, mercantile wealth, and mercenarial employment.

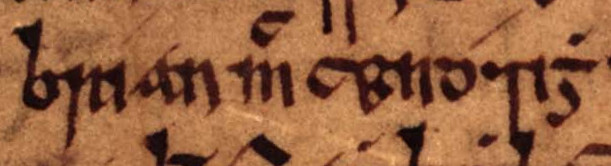
The name of Brian Bóruma mac Cennétig as it appears on folio 15r of Oxford Bodleian Library Rawlinson B 488 (the Annals of Tigernach): ("Brian mac Cendéidigh").

The exact chronology of the events attributed to Lagmann on the Continent is uncertain. There is reason to suspect that the episode concerning 1014 may be erroneous, and actually refers to Óláfr's otherwise known campaigning with Þorkell inn hávi in 1009–1011. Certainly, no English source associates Óláfr with Knútr in 1014, at about the time when the former was active in Scandinavia claiming the Norwegian kingship. Although it is likewise uncertain who ruled the Isles at about the time of the Battle of Clontarf, it is conceivable that Lagmann held a degree of authority on Mann. The royal title accorded to him by Gesta Normannorum ducum suggests that had ruled in the Kingdom of the Isles, or at least possessed a claim to the kingship. One possibility is that his actions in England and on the Continent are evidence that he had been exiled from the Isles by this time. Such an expatriation could have come about in the immediate aftermath of the death of Ragnall in 1005. If correct, Brian Bóruma mac Cennétig, High King of Ireland could have seized upon Ragnall's demise and forced Lagmann from the Isles in an attempt to wrest control of realm for himself. The fact that the Annals of Ulster describes Brian in 1014 as "over-king of the Gaels of Ireland, and of the Foreigners, and of the Britons" could be evidence that Brian indeed held authority in the Isles, or at least sought to. It is conceivable that such interference could have enticed certain Islesmen to back Sitriuc and the Dubliners against Brian at the Battle of Clontarf that year.

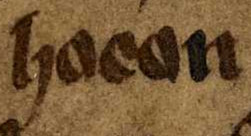
The name of Hákon Eiríksson as it appears on folio 11v of AM 325 II 4to (Ágrip af Nóregskonungasǫgum): "Hǫ́kon". Hákon may have possessed authority in the Isles following the death of Lagmann and his son.

If Lagmann and his son died at about the same time, the lack of a suitable native candidate to succeed as King of the Isles may account for the record of the region falling under the control of the Norwegian Hákon Eiríksson. Evidence that Knútr installed Hákon as overlord of the Isles may be preserved by the twelfth-century Ágrip af Nóregskonungasǫgum. The historicity of this event is uncertain, however, and Hákon's authority in the Isles is not attested by any other source. If Hákon had indeed possessed overlordship of the Isles, his eventual demise in 1029 or 1030 may well have paved the way for the rise of Echmarcach mac Ragnaill, King of Dublin and the Isles, a man who may have been a son of Lagmann's brother, and who first appears on record in about 1031.

The tenth- or eleventh-century Gesta Normannorum alleges that the dukes of Normandy were associated with people variably identified in Latin as the Hibernenses—a term that ostensibly refers to the Irish. At one point the text claims that Richard II's father, Richard I, Duke of Normandy, enjoyed the military assistance of the Hibernenses. Although this particular passage purports to describe events in the late tenth-century, it is evident that the source is heavily influenced by the realities of the early eleventh century. Whilst there is no evidence that Richard I had access to Irish support, there is instead reason to suspect that Gesta Normannorum actually refers to the Norse-Gaelic rulers of the Kingdom of the Isles and the Irish Sea region. In fact, it is possible that Richard II's association with Lagmann influenced the passage connecting Richard I with a military alliance with the Hibernenses. In another passage, Gesta Normannorum alleges that Richard I was involved in securing peace between the English and the Hibernenses. Certainly, a papal directive of 991 reveals that the English and Normans concluded a peace treaty in which the duke was called upon to resist from aiding the enemies of the English. Together, this pact and Gesta Normannorum, may indicate that Richard I was associated with leading figures in the Irish Sea region, such as Lagmann's father and uncle, Maccus mac Arailt. The latter two were actively campaigning in the Irish Sea region in the 970s and 980s. As such, Lagmann may have continued his family's cooperation with the dukes of Normandy. Another source that seems to evince military collaboration between the Isles and Normandy is the eleventh-century Historiarum libri quinque. Although the reliability of this chronicle is suspect, it nevertheless relates that Richard II enjoyed an amiable alliance and military assistance from "the islands beyond the sea", and may partly evince links between the Normans and the Irish Sea region.

== Citations ==
Lagmann mac Gofraid Uí Ímair
Regnal titles
Preceded by Ragnall mac Gofraid	King of the Isles^{1}	Succeeded by Hákon Eiríksson
Notes and references
1. It is uncertain if Lagmann and Hákon ruled as King of the Isles.
