= Godredsson =

Godredsson is a patronymic meaning son of Godred. It is the anglicised form of the Old Norse patronymic Guðrøðarson. Notable people with this patronymic include:

- Fingal Godredsson (died 1070), late 11th-century ruler of the Kingdom of the Isles
- Harald Godredsson, mid-13th-century King of the Isles
- Lagman Godredsson
  - Lagmann mac Gofraid (fl. early eleventh century), King of the Isles
  - Lǫgmaðr Guðrøðarson (fl. late eleventh century), King of the Isles
- Olaf I Godredsson, 12th-century ruler of the Isle of Man and the Hebrides
- Olaf II Godredsson, mid-13th-century sea-king who ruled the Isle of Man (Mann) and parts of the Hebrides
- Ragnvald Godredsson (died 1229), ruled as King of the Isles from 1187 to 1226
