= Gilli (Hebridean earl) =

Hebridean earl

- Earl in the Hebrides
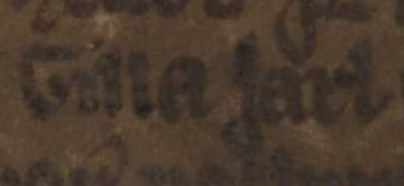
- Gilli's name and title as it appears on folio 4r of AM 162 B epsilon (Njáls saga): "Gilla jarl".
- Spouse: Hvarflǫð Hlǫðvisdóttir

Gilli was an eleventh-century Hebridean chieftain whose career coincided with an era of Orcadian overlordship in the Kingdom of the Isles. According to mediaeval saga-tradition, Gilli was a brother-in-law of Sigurðr Hlǫðvisson, Earl of Orkney, having married the latter's sister Hvarflǫð. Traditionally regarded as one of the most powerful Orcadian earls, Sigurðr appears to have extended his authority into the Isles in the late tenth century. Gilli apparently acted as Sigurðr's viceroy or tributary earl in the region. The time frame of Gilli's apparent authority in the Isles is uncertain, and may date as early as the reign of Guðrøðr Haraldsson, King of the Isles, or as late as the period following the death of this man's eventual successor, Rǫgnvaldr Guðrøðarson, King of the Isles. Gilli's name is probably Gaelic in origin, and he seems to have seated himself on either Coll or Colonsay, islands in the Inner Hebrides. It is possible that Gilli is identical to Gilla Ciaráin mac Glún Iairn, an Uí Ímair dynast who was slain at the Battle of Clontarf in 1014. If not, another possibility is that he was the father of a certain Conamal/Conmáel who was killed in 980.

== Earl in the Hebrides ==
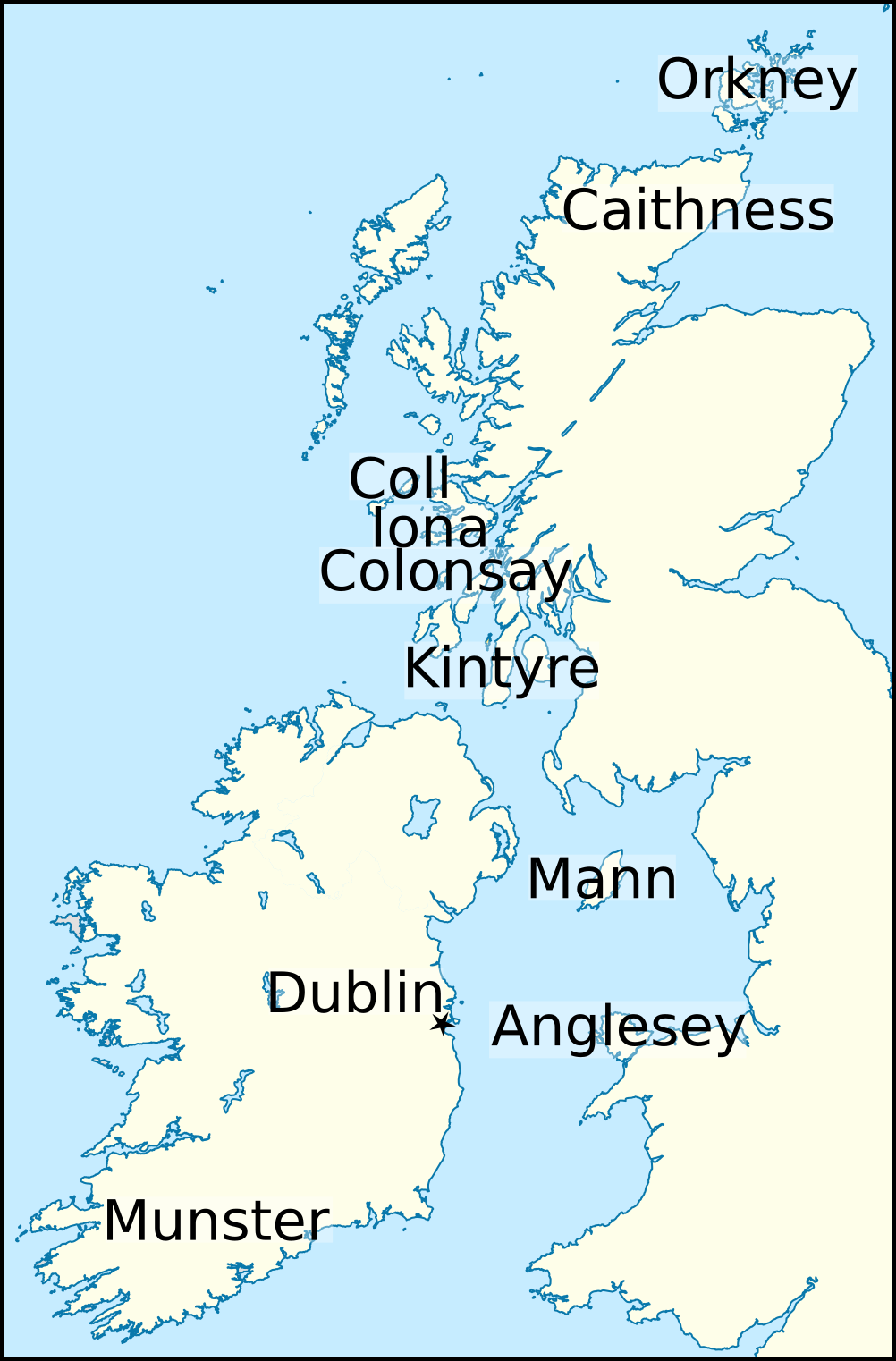
Locations relating to Gilli's life and times.

There is evidence to suggest that Sigurðr Hlǫðvisson, Earl of Orkney extended his authority from Orkney into the Isles in the late tenth- and early eleventh century. For instance, the thirteenth-century Njáls saga—the only source that specifically refers to Gilli—states that one of Sigurðr's followers, Kári Sǫlmundarson, extracted taxes from the northern Hebrides, then controlled by Gilli himself. Whether these taxes were due to Norwegian overlords of Sigurðr, as the saga states, is uncertain. (Note: According to Flóamanna saga, at about this period in history, tribute from the Isles was due to Hákon Sigurðarson, Earl of Hlaðir.) The saga further declares that Sigurðr and his men defeated Guðrøðr Haraldsson, King of the Isles, after which they plundered the Isles. (Note: One possibility is that the saga has confused Guðrøðr for his son, Rǫgnvaldr.) Also noted are additional assaults conducted by accomplices of Sigurðr throughout the Hebrides, Kintyre, Mann (against Guðrøðr), and Anglesey. The thirteenth-century Orkneyinga saga also reports Sigurðr's raids into the Isles, as does Eyrbyggja saga, a thirteenth-century source which further notes his taxation of the kingdom. Contemporary Orcadian expansion may be perceptible in the evidence of the land-assessment system of ouncelands in the Hebrides and along the western coast of Scotland. If Sigurðr's authority indeed stretched over the Isles in the last decades of the tenth century, such an intrusion could account for the numbers of silver hoards dating to this time.

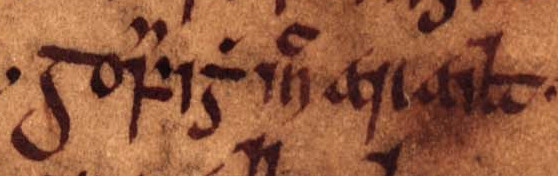
The name of Guðrøðr Haraldsson as it appears on folio 15r of Oxford Bodleian Library Rawlinson B 488 (the Annals of Tigernach): "Gofraidh mac Arailt".

Various Irish annals also reveal that this was a period of strife in the Isles, as Danair (literally "Danes") are recorded active in the region throughout 986 and 987. Although it is not impossible that the Danair (perhaps merely meaning "pirates") refer to Sigurðr's forces, it is more likely that they are instead identical to the Vikings who are otherwise attested attacking England in the 990s. (Note: The fact that this group of Vikings is identified as Danair and not Gaill (literally "foreigners"), a term more commonly accorded to Vikings by Irish sources, could indicate that the Danair were Scandinavians and culturally distinct from the Norse-Gaelic Vikings of the region.) In fact, it seems that the Danair were active in the region against opponents of Guðrøðr. This could indicate that either the kin of the recently deceased Amlaíb Cuarán, King of Northumbria and Dublin, or perhaps an Orcadian-aligned Islesman like Gilli himself, may have fallen target to an alliance between the Danair and Guðrøðr. This could in turn reveal that the aforesaid claims of continuous Orcadian conquests in the Isles—otherwise unrecorded outwith saga-tradition—give a less than unbiased account of events. Whatever the case, Guðrøðr was slain in 989, after which the political cohesion of Kingdom of the Isles—perhaps shaken by Orcadian encroachment in the 980s—seems to have diminished. (Note: According to the Annals of Tigernach and the Annals of Ulster, Guðrøðr was slain in Dál Riata. This could be evidence that he fell against Gilli and members of the Gall Goídil, a population of mixed Scandinavian and Gaelic ethnicity located in the Hebrides and parts of the former kingdom of Dál Riata.)

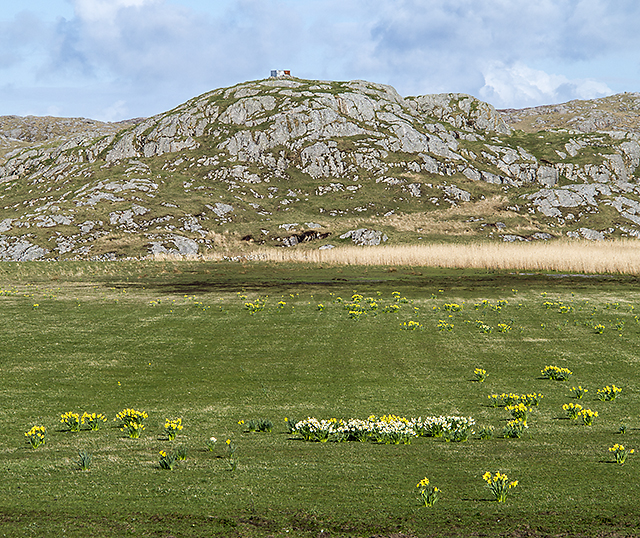
Rocky moorland near Gallanach, Coll. A rocky hillside near Gallanach, known as Cnoc Ghillebhreide (grid reference NM21766078), has been associated with fairies, Colum Cille, and Gilli himself, since the early twentieth century. In 1972, the site was visited by the Ordnance Survey, with no evidence of antiquity being observed.

The extent of Guðrøðr's authority in the Hebrides is unknown due to his apparent coexistence with Gilli, and to the uncertainty of Orcadian encroachment. Guðrøðr's successor is likewise uncertain. On one hand, he may have been succeeded by his son, Rǫgnvaldr. Although it is conceivable that either Gilli or Sigurðr capitalised on Guðrøðr's death, and extended their overlordship as far south as Mann, possible after-effects such as these are uncorroborated. (Note: At some point, Rǫgnvaldr gained the kingship of the Isles, as evidenced by the title accorded to him on his death in Munster in 1004/1005. Nothing else is certain of Rǫgnvaldr.) Although it is possible that Gilli controlled the Hebrides whilst Guðrøðr ruled Mann, the title accorded to the latter on his death could indicate otherwise. If so, the chronology of Gilli's subordination to Sigurðr may actually date to the period after Rǫgnvaldr's death in 1004/1005.

According to Njáls saga, Gilli was seated on Kola or Kolu, an island that appears to refer to Coll or perhaps Colonsay. (Note: Another possibility is that the Old Norse name instead refers to Colum Cille's church on Iona. This sanctuary is named Kolumkillakirkja by Magnúss saga berfœtts, a text which forms part of the early thirteenth-century saga-compilation Heimskringla.) The saga also states that Gilli was married to Sigurðr's sister, Hvarflǫð. This marital alliance appears to further evince the southward extension of Sigurðr's influence. This union, along with the record of apparent amiable dealings with Sigurðr's associates, suggests that Gilli and Sigurðr indeed enjoyed close relations. The earl's family was clearly not averse to marrying into native dynasties, as Sigurðr's own mother was the daughter of an Irish king, whilst his wife was the daughter of a Scottish king. In fact, the aforesaid sources appear to indicate that Gilli operated in the Hebrides as a tributary earl to his brother-in-law. Certainly, Eyrbyggja saga states that Sigurðr left menn ("agents") in the Hebrides to collect tax from Mann, whilst Orkneyinga saga reveals that, at a later period in time, Sigurðr's son and successor, Þórfinnr Sigurðarson, Earl of Orkney, tasked a member of his own wife's family, Kálfr Árnason, to impose Orcadian authority in the Isles.

== Clontarf, Gilla Ciaráin, and Conamal/Conmáel ==
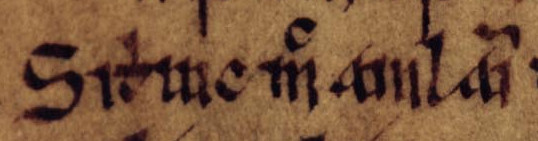
The name of Sitriuc mac Amlaíb as it appears on folio 16v of Oxford Bodleian Library Rawlinson B 488: "Sitriuic mac Amlaim".

By the end of the first decade of the eleventh century, the principal ruler in Ireland was Brian Bóruma mac Cennétig, High King of Ireland. Brian's daughter, Sláine, was married to Sitriuc mac Amlaíb, King of Dublin, whilst the latter's mother, Gormlaith ingen Murchada was a former wife of Brian. In 1013, Sitriuc allied himself to Brian's enemies, and revolted against Brian's overlordship. Although Brian proceeded to lay siege to Dublin—the only Viking town that participated in the revolt against his supremacy—Sitriuc retained possession of the settlement, and Brian retired to Munster for Christmas.

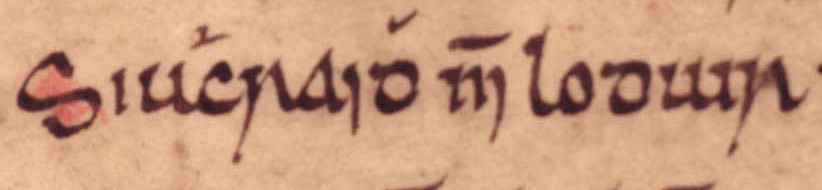
The name of Sigurðr Hlǫðvisson as it appears on folio 36v of Oxford Bodleian Library Rawlinson B 489 (the Annals of Ulster).

According to Njáls saga, Gilli and Sitriuc spent Yule with Sigurðr in Orkney, where Sitriuc convinced Sigurðr to ally himself against Brian on the condition that Sigurðr would gain Gormlaith in marriage. In April 1014, the opposing forces met and clashed at the remarkably bloody Battle of Clontarf. Although Brian's forces ultimately won the day, and Sigurðr himself was amongst the slain, Brian lost his life as well. As for Gilli, he appears in a chapter of Njáls saga that presents a series of supernatural events connected with the conflict. In one instance, a Caithnessman is said to have witnessed valkyrie-like apparitions singing songs for the slain, whilst a similar event is said to have occurred in the Faroe Islands. Priests in Iceland are stated to have encountered paranormal phenomena, whilst an Orcadian is said to have encountered the spectre of Sigurðr before disappearing off the face of the earth. Regarding Gilli, the saga asserts that he dreamt of a song that foretold the outcome of the battle and the fall of Brian and Sigurðr. There is reason to suspect that the aforesaid supernatural manifestations—arguably somewhat detached from the saga's general narrative—are actually interpolations of separate material. Elsewhere in the narrative, however, there are examples of paranormal phenomena intervening into human affairs. For example, the episode concerning Gilli's dream seems to directly parallel an earlier episode in which another man, the Icelander Flosi Þórðarson, is depicted dreaming of the burning of the saga's eponym, Njáll Þorgeirsson. (Note: The account of the Caithnessman's vision is traditionally known as Darraðarljóð. There is reason to suspect that this poem does not refer to the Battle of Clontarf at all, but to a conflict dating almost a century before, fought between Sitriuc Cáech, King of Northumbria and Dublin and Niall Glúndub, High King of Ireland.)

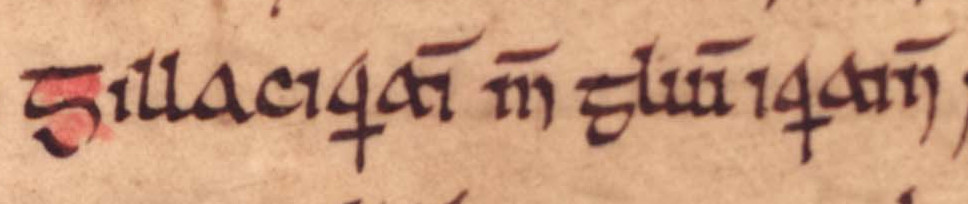
The name of Gilla Ciaráin mac Glún Iairn as it appears on folio 36v of Oxford Bodleian Library Rawlinson B 489.

If the account of Gilli in the aftermath of Clontarf has been constructed for dramatic effect, the passage may not be evidence of his floruit beyond this point in history. In fact, it is possible that he is identical to Gilla Ciaráin mac Glún Iairn, a man who was amongst those slain at the battle. The Annals of Ulster, which records the latter's fall, styles him rígdamna Gall ("heir-designate of the Foreigners"), revealing that Gilla Ciaráin was indeed a prominent man. Sitriuc is known to have had an elder brother named Glún Iairn, a man who had reigned as King of Dublin until his death in 989. If Gilla Ciaráin was a son of this king, his apparent tender age at the time of his father's death could account for Sitriuc's accession to the kingship. Furthermore, the aforesaid title accorded to Gilla Ciaráin appears to indicate that he was regarded as his uncle's royal heir. If Gilli and Gilla Ciaráin are indeed identical, his pre-eminent status in the Norse-Gaelic world would help to explain his marital alliance with Sigurðr.

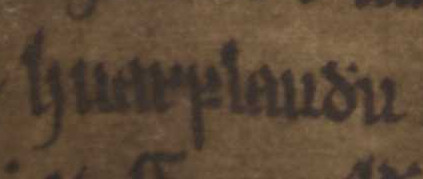
The name of Hvarflǫð as it appears on folio 59r of AM 132 fol (Möðruvallabók).

Gilla Ciaráin's father bore a Gaelic name meaning "iron knee". It may or may not be a Gaelicisation of Járnkné, an identical-meaning Old Norse name. Gilla Ciaráin's own name is Gaelic, meaning "the servant of Saint Ciarán". Gaelic names beginning with the initial name-element Gilla- first appear on record in last half of the tenth century. Such names were shortened to Gilli by Scandinavian settlers in Britain and Ireland. In fact, such a phenomenon may account for the name accorded to Gilli himself. Gilli's name suggests that he was at least partly of Gaelic descent, perhaps either Irish or Hebridean. Although various names are attributed to Gilli's wife in the numerous versions of Njáls saga, the best version of this source gives Hvarflǫð. This name appears to be an Old Norse form of Forbflaith, a relatively rare Gaelic name. (Note: The saga-evidence of Gilli interacting with Icelanders and Orcadians reveals that he was a Norse speaker.)

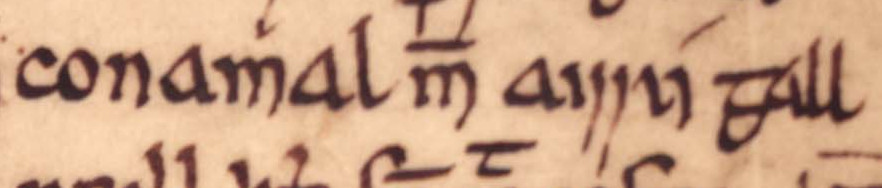
The name of a certain Conamal as it appears on folio 33v of Oxford Bodleian Library Rawlinson B 489. The man's patronym in this source seems to refer to a royal title, whilst other sources seem to refer to a similar-looking personal name.

There may be further evidence concerning familial relations. In 980, Máel Sechnaill mac Domnaill, High King of Ireland utterly defeated Amlaíb Cuarán's forces at the Battle of Tara. One of the casualties of this remarkable conflict was a man identified as "Conamhal m. airri Gall" by the Annals of Ulster, and "Conmael mac Gilli Airi" by the Annals of Tigernach. (Note: Other sources recording this man include the seventeenth-century Annals of the Four Masters ("Chonamhail, mic Gilli Airri"), the Annals of Clonmacnoise ("Conawill mcGillearrie"), and the twelfth-century Chronicon Scotorum ("Conamail mac Gille Airre").) It is possible that these annal-entries refer to a man named Conamal or Conmáel, who was in turn the son of a man named Gilli, and that either the father or the son bore the title airrí Gall ("royal deputy of the Foreigners"). If correct, it is conceivable that this father is identical to Gilli himself. Against this identification, however, is the fact that the aforesaid saga-tradition depicts Gilli active at about the time of the Battle of Clontarf. The considerable span of time between the death of Conamal/Conmáel and this conflict may well be evidence that a paternal relationship between Conamal/Conmáel and Gilli is unlikely. Whatever the case, the sources appear to be confused as to whether the patronym refers to a personal name or a title. One possibility is that this confusion could indicate that the sources refer to both the personal name Gilla Maire and the epithet Gall. (Note: If the sources indeed refer to the name Gilla Maire it is possible that the father and son were members of Clann Eruilb. This particular family was either a branch of the Uí Néill or else a family of Scandinavian origin which was assigned a fabricated Uí Néill ancestry in the eleventh century. If the annals instead refer to a title, rather than a patronym, they could instead reveal that Conamal/Conmáel was the son of a King of the Isles, and subservient to the reigning King of Dublin. If correct, Conamal/Conmáel could have been a son of Guðrøðr.)

== See also ==
- Ásbjǫrn skerjablesi, a ninth-century Hebridean earl
