= Hagrold =

Viking chieftain

Hagrold (fl. 944–954), also known as Hagroldus, Harold, and Harald, was a powerful tenth-century Viking chieftain who ruled Bayeux. He was apparently a pagan from Scandinavia, and seems to have seized power in Normandy at about the time of the death of William, Count of Rouen. His career can be interpreted in the context of aiding the Normans against the intrusion of Frankish authority, or conversely in the context of taking advantage of the Normans.

== Context ==
Following the assassination of William, Count of Rouen, a man whose son and successor, Richard was merely a child, the Franks took steps to extend their authority into neighbouring Normandy. In 944, according to an account of events preserved by the contemporary Annales of Flodoard and Historiae of Richerus, in the wake of the confusion in Normandy, Louis IV, King of the Franks gave Hugh, Duke of the Franks permission to seize control of the town of Bayeux. Although the duke proceeded to assail the settlement, before he gained control the king reneged on his promise whereupon Hugh left the region.

== Attestation ==
According to the Annales and Historiae, Hagrold captured Louis in 945, after which Hugh eventually secured the king's release through negotiations. The fact that Hagrold is described as in charge of Bayeux in these accounts suggests that he led the successful defence of the town in the preceding year. He was clearly a considerably powerful figure to have not only gained power but withstand Frankish aggression. At this point in history, even before William's assassination, Norman comital power encompassed little more than the outskirts of Rouen. Hagrold—apparently a pagan from Scandinavia—seems to have ruled Bayeaux as his personal domain, and apparently stood independent from both the Franks and Normans. The political disarray in Denmark at about this time would have likely contributed to such settlement in Normandy, and could account from Hagrold's presence there. The successive waves of Scandinavian settlers into Lower Normandy during this period likely contributed to the lack of comital power.

On one hand, it is possible that, following William's death, Hagrold seized control of parts of the Cotentin with foreign support, and extended his authority to Bayeux. On the other hand, Hagrold may have operated in the context of aiding the Normans of Rouen to oppose the Franks. Although he likely defended Bayeux from Louis and Hugh in 944, Hagrold's capture of Louis the following years suggests that he volunteered to assist Hugh against the king. Religious affiliations played appear to have been factor in the political alignments of tenth-century Normandy. According to the Annales, many pagans from Scandinavia arrived in Normandy in 943, leading some Normans to revert from Christianity to paganism. Long after Hagrold's floruit, Norman secular and ecclesiastical authority in Bayeux remained precarious. Hagrold appears on record as late as 954, when Richard and Hugh are recorded to have attacked Bayeux.

What came of Hagrold is uncertain. One possibility is that he and his family removed to the Irish Sea region, and that his descendants were the Meic Arailt, a family that contested control of this region with the Meic Amlaíb branch of the Uí Ímair. On the other hand, the evidence concerning the Meic Arailt seems to indicate that this family—represented in the second generation by Gofraid mac Arailt and Maccus mac Arailt—was merely a branch of the Uí Ímair itself.

== Later interpretations ==
Whilst the historical accounts of Flodoard are generally reliable, the same cannot be said of the treatment of the tenth century by Dudo. In the latter's tenth- or eleventh-century Gesta Normannorum, Hagrold is depicted as a Danish king who arrived in Normandy to aid the young the Count of Rouen during his minority. Dudo's use of Hagrold in this context seems to be an attempt to explain the presence of fiercely independent pagan Vikings in Normandy without compromising the myth of a cohesive Norman state and a Norman religion. Like Dudo, William of Jumièges, in his eleventh-century Gesta Normannorum ducum, identifies Hagrold as a Danish king, and conflated him with the latter's contemporary namesake, Haraldr Gormsson, King of Denmark. According to Gesta Normannorum ducum, Haraldr/Hagrold came to Normandy after having been ejected from Denmark by his son, Sveinn. In actuality, there is no evidence that Haraldr ever went to Normandy. Instead, sources such as the eleventh-century texts Encomium Emmae reginae and Gesta Hammaburgensis ecclesiae pontificum state that he sought assistance from the Slavs.
