= Kingdom of the Isles =

Norse-Gaelic polity in the British Isles (849–1265)

Kingdom of Mann and the Isles Suðreyjar (Old Norse) Innse Gall (Irish)
- 849–1265
- Kingdom of the Isles or 'Sodor' (bright red) in the 11th Century
- Status: Kingdom under Norwegian suzerainty
- Common languages: Old Norse; Middle Irish; Ecclesiastical Latin
- Religion: Norse paganism; Roman Catholicism
- History
  - Formed: c.849
  - Partitioned between Crovan dynasty and Somerled dynasty: 1164
  - Transferred to the Kingdom of Scotland: 1265
Preceded by	Succeeded by
Picts; Dál Riata	Kingdom of Scotland
- Today part of: Isle of Man; United Kingdom (Scotland)

The Kingdom of the Isles was a Norse–Gaelic kingdom comprising the Isle of Man, the Hebrides and the islands of the Clyde from the 9th to the 13th centuries. It is also called Sodor or the Sudreys, from its Old Norse name Suðreyjar, or "Southern Isles"; as distinct from the Norðreyjar or Northern Isles of Orkney and Shetland. Some of its later rulers were referred to as kings of Mann and the Isles. The historical record is incomplete, and the kingdom was not a continuous entity throughout the whole period. At times it was independent of outside control, although for much of the period the Isles were a Norwegian dependency and its rulers had overlords in Norway, Orkney, or Ireland. At times there also appear to have been competing claims for all or parts of the territory. The islands have a total land area of over 8,300 square kilometres (3,205 sq mi) and extend for more than 500 kilometres (310 mi) from north to south.

Viking influence in the area began in the late 8th century. There is no doubt that the Uí Ímair (Ivar) dynasty played a prominent role in this early period, but the records for the dates and details of its rulers are speculative until the mid-10th century. Hostility between the Kings of the Isles and the rulers of Ireland, and intervention by the crown of Norway (either directly or through their vassal the Earl of Orkney) were recurring themes.

An invasion by Magnus Barefoot in the 1090s resulted in a brief period of direct Norwegian rule over the kingdom, but soon the descendants of Godred Crovan re-asserted a further period of largely independent overlordship. This came to an end with the rise of Somerled, on whose death in 1164 the kingdom was split in two. Just over a century later, the Isles were transferred from Norwegian overlordship to the Kingdom of Scotland, following the 1266 Treaty of Perth. Most of the territory continued as the Scottish Lordship of the Isles and Diocese of the Isles.

== Geography ==
The principal islands under consideration are as follows:

- The Isle of Man, located in the Irish Sea, equidistant from modern England, Ulster, Scotland and Wales.
- The islands of the Firth of Clyde some 140 kilometres (87 mi) to the north, the largest of which are Bute and Arran.
- The southern Inner Hebrides to the west and north of the Kintyre peninsula, including Islay, Jura, Mull and Iona.
- The Inner Hebrides to the north of Ardnamurchan, made up of the Small Isles (including Eigg and Rùm), Skye, Raasay and their outliers.
- The Outer Hebrides, aka the "Long Island" to the west, separated from the northern Inner Hebrides by the waters of the Minch.

These islands, often referred to as the Sudreys, have a total land area of approximately 8,374 square kilometres (3,233 sq mi) of which:

- the Isle of Man is 572 square kilometres (221 sq mi), 7% of the total
- the Islands of the Clyde 574 square kilometres (222 sq mi), 7% of the total
- the Inner Hebrides 4,158 square kilometres (1,605 sq mi), 50% of the total
- the Outer Hebrides 3,070 square kilometres (1,185 sq mi), 36% of the total.

Anglesey in modern Wales may also have been part of the insular Viking world from an early stage.

Orkney is some 180 kilometres (110 mi) east-northeast of the Outer Hebrides, Shetland is a further 80 kilometres (50 mi) further northeast and Norway some 300 kilometres (190 mi) due east of Shetland. The total distance from the southern tip of the Isle of Man to the Butt of Lewis, the northern extremity of the Outer Hebrides, is approximately 515 kilometres (320 mi).

== Early history ==
=== Sources ===
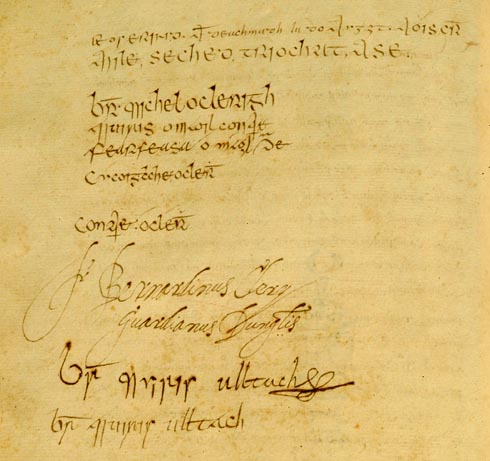
Signature page from the Annals of the Four Masters

The presence of the monastery on Iona led to this part of Scotland being relatively well documented from the mid-6th to the mid-9th centuries. However, from 849 on, when Columba's relics were removed in the face of Viking incursions, written evidence from local sources all but vanishes for three hundred years. The sources for information about the Hebrides and indeed much of northern Scotland from the 8th to the 11th century are thus almost exclusively Irish, English or Norse. The main Norse text is the Orkneyinga Saga, which should be treated with care as it was based on oral traditions and not written down by an Icelandic scribe until the early 13th century. The English and Irish sources are more contemporary, but may have "led to a southern bias in the story", especially as much of the Hebridean archipelago became Norse-speaking during the period under consideration. The archaeological record for this period is relatively scant, particularly in comparison to the numerous Neolithic and Iron Age finds in the area.

Scholarly interpretations of the period "have led to widely divergent reconstructions of Viking Age Scotland" and Barrett (2008) has identified four competing theories, none of which he regards as proven.

It is clear that the word "King", as used by and of the rulers of Norwegian descent in the isles, was not intended to convey sovereign rule (that is, that of a High King). This is different from the way the word was used in the emerging Kingdom of Scotland at the time. It should also be borne in mind that different kings may have ruled over very different areas and that few of them can be seen as exerting any kind of close control over this "far-flung sea kingdom". Precise dates are sometimes a matter of debate amongst historians.

=== Early Viking incursions in the Hebrides ===
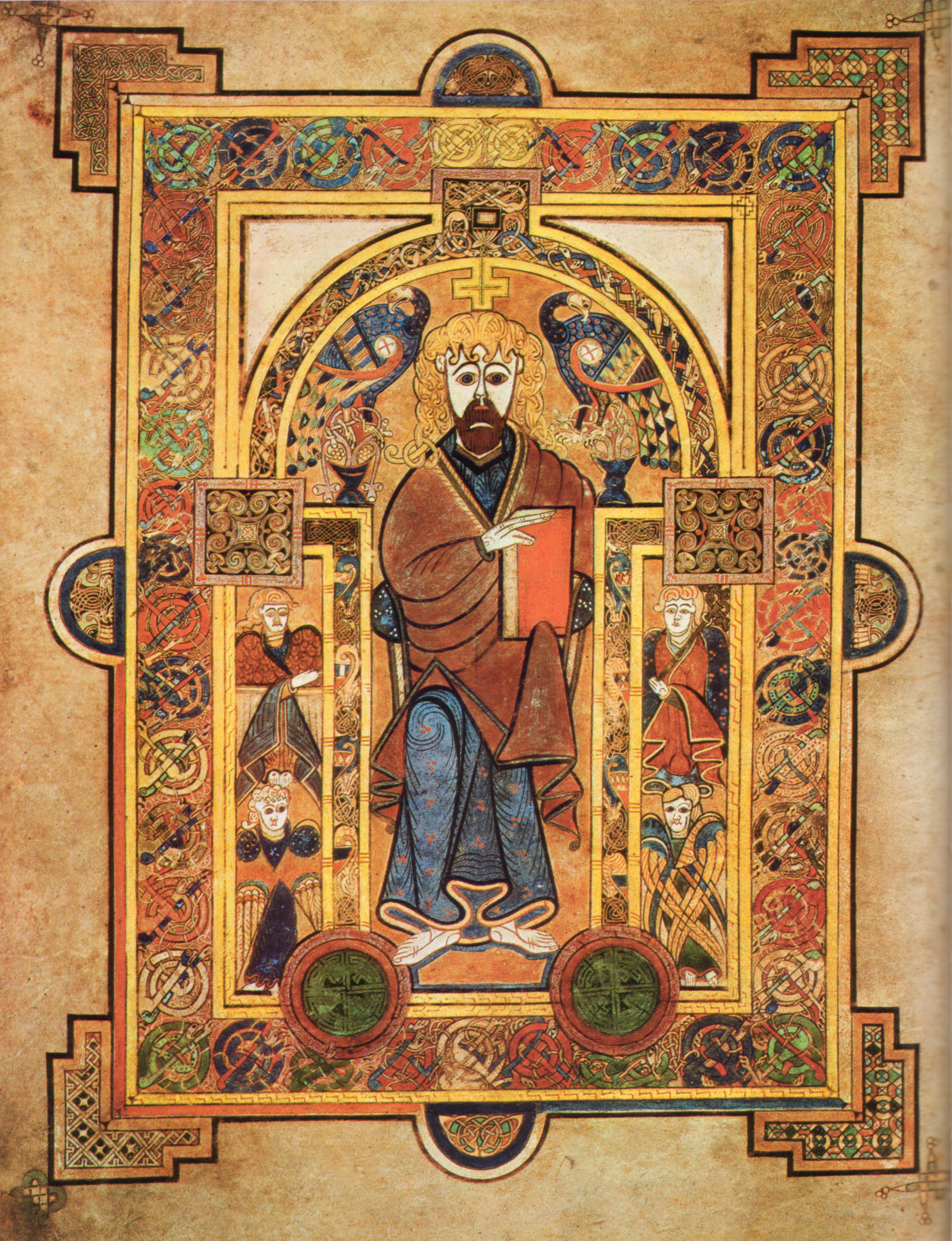
Folio 32v of the Book of Kells which may have been produced by the monks of Iona and taken to Ireland for safekeeping after repeated Viking raids of the Hebrides.

Prior to the Viking incursions the southern Hebrides formed part of the Gaelic kingdom of Dál Riata (or Dalriada). North of Dál Riata, the Inner and Outer Hebrides were nominally under Pictish control although the historical record is sparse. (Note: Hunter (2000) states that in relation to King Bridei I of the Picts in the sixth century: "As for Shetland, Orkney, Skye and the Western Isles, their inhabitants, most of whom appear to have been Pictish in culture and speech at this time, are likely to have regarded Bridei as a fairly distant presence".) According to Ó Corráin (1998) "when and how the Vikings conquered and occupied the Isles is unknown, perhaps unknowable", although from 793 onwards repeated raids by Vikings on the British Isles are recorded. "All the islands of Britain" were devastated in 794 with Iona being sacked in 802 and 806. (Note: These attacks on Christian settlements in the islands of the west were nothing new. In the 6th century Tiree was raided by Pictish forces, Tory Island was attacked in the early 7th century by a "marine fleet" and Donnán of Eigg and 52 companions were murdered by Picts on Eigg in 617.) Various named Viking leaders, who were probably based in Scotland, appear in the Irish annals: Soxulfr in 837, Turges in 845 and Hákon in 847. Another early reference to the Norse presence in the Irish records is that there was a king of "Viking Scotland" whose heir, Thórir, took an army to Ireland in 848.

In the 9th century, the first references to the Gallgáedil (i.e., "foreign Gaels") appear. This term was variously used in succeeding centuries to refer to individuals of mixed Scandinavian–Celtic descent and/or culture who became dominant in southwest Scotland, parts of northern England and the isles.

According to the Orkneyinga Saga, in about 872 Harald Fairhair became king of a united Norway and many of his opponents fled to the islands of Scotland including the Hebrides of the west coast, and the Northern Isles. (Note: Some scholars believe that this story, which appears in the Orkneyinga Saga, is apocryphal and based on the later voyages of Magnus Barelegs.) Harald pursued his enemies and incorporated the Northern Isles into his kingdom in 875 and then, perhaps a little over a decade later, the Hebrides as well. The following year the local Viking chieftains of the Hebrides rebelled. Harald then sent Ketill Flatnose to subdue them, which he did quickly, but then he declared himself an independent "King of the Isles", a title he retained for the rest of his life. (Note: Hunter (2000) states that Ketill [ˈketelː] was "in charge of an extensive island realm and, as a result, sufficiently prestigious to contemplate the making of agreements and alliances with other princelings", but stops short of describing him as a monarch.) Ketill is also sometimes equated with Caittil Find, a reported leader of the Gallgáedil fighting in Ireland in 857, although this connection is far from definite. (Note: The Ketill/Caittil relationship is described by Woolf (2007) as "extremely tenuous" although in an earlier publication he appears to support this identification.) Ketill left no successors and there is little record of the succeeding four decades. However, Woolf (2007) suggests that his appearance in the sagas "looks very much like a story created in later days to legitimise Norwegian claims to sovereignty in the region".

There are similar problems with the provenance of Gofraid mac Fergusa, the supposed 9th-century ruler of the Hebrides and ancestor of Clan Donald. It has been suggested that his appearance looks "very much like the product of fourteenth-century propagandists from Clann Donald".

=== House of Ímar ===
In 870 Dumbarton was besieged by Amlaíb Conung and Ímar, "the two kings of the Northmen", who "returned to Dublin from Britain" the following year with numerous captives. It is therefore likely that Scandinavian hegemony was already significant on the western coasts of Scotland by then. Amlaíb Conung is described as the "son of the king of Lochlainn" in the Fragmentary Annals of Ireland and Ó Corráin (1998) argues that Lochlainn "is Viking Scotland and probably includes Man" at this time suggesting an early date for an organised Kingdom of the Isles. In the same source Amlaíb Conung is also recorded as having gone to the aid of his father Gofraidh, who was under assault from Vikings in Lochlainn in about 872. Gofraidh died in 873 and may have been succeeded briefly by Ímar who also died that year. Amlaíb probably died in 874. A lament for Áed mac Cináeda, a Pictish king who died in 878, suggests Kintyre may have been lost to his kingdom at that time. The Norse may have taken the Isle of Man in 877 and they certainly held it by 900. In 902 the Vikings were expelled from Dublin for up to a dozen years, and a year later Ímar, the "grandson of Ímar" was killed in battle with the forces of Constantine II in mainland Scotland. (Note: In the late 10th century the battle of "Innisibsolian" was won by Alban forces over vikings. This has been identified as possibly taking place near the Slate Islands of Argyll, although this seems speculative.) However these events were setbacks for the Norse rather than a definitive moment. Internecine fighting is recorded in the Annals of Ulster of 914, which describe Ragnall ua Ímair's defeat of Bárid mac Oitir in a naval battle off the Isle of Man.

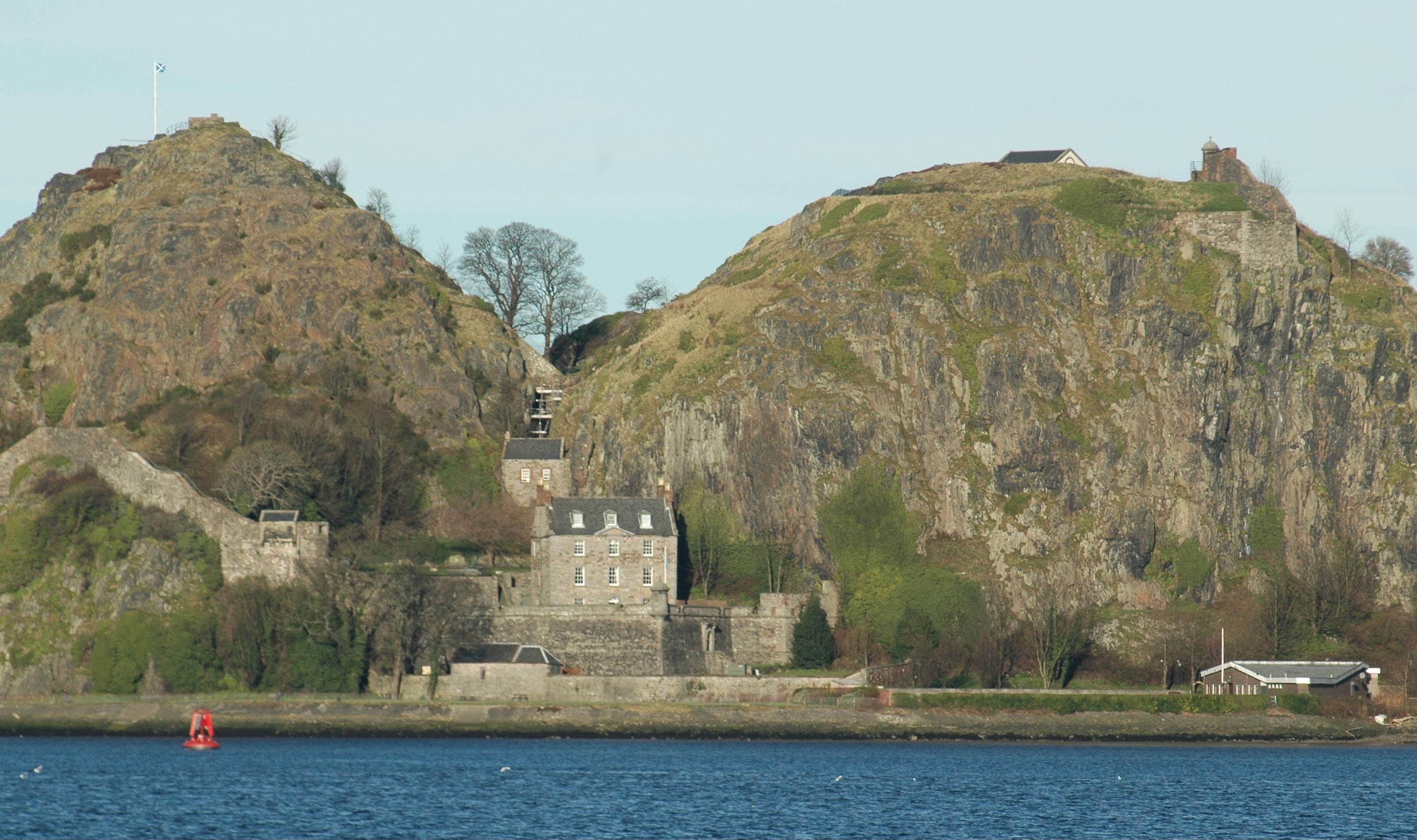
Modern Dumbarton Castle, the site of the 9th-century siege by Amlaíb Conung and Ímar

The first four decades of the 10th century are an obscure period so far as the Hebrides are concerned. It is possible that Ragnall ua Ímair, who probably ruled Mann during this period may have had some influence. However, Amlaíb Cuarán is the next King of the Isles on record. After the death of Amlaíb mac Gofraid in 941, (Note: In 941, the year of Amlaíb mac Gofraid's death, the Chronicum Scotorum records that a fleet was led by one of the Irish kings to the "islands of Alba" possibly in response to a Viking raid on Dalriada.) Amlaíb Cuarán became King of Northumbria and probably succeeded his cousin Amlaíb as King of Mann. The former is recorded as being the Rex plurimarum insularum, suggesting he may have been the first King of both Mann and the Western Isles (Note: Murray (1973) notes that "Western Isles" has tended to mean "Outer Hebrides" since the creation of the Na h-Eileanan an Iar or Western Isles parliamentary constituency in 1918. The phrase can also be used to refer to the Hebrides in general, which is the intention in this instance.) of Scotland. (Note: Amlaíb Cuarán is also referred to in the Cath Ruis na Ríg as rí Lochlainne, i.e., "the king of Lochlainn", adding weight to the view that Lochlainn/Viking Scotland/Mann and the Isles are interchangeable. However, Barrett (2008) regards the Lochlainn hypothesis as one of the two "least probable" of the four he identifies.)

Amlaíb, who died some four decades later in 980 or 981 whilst in "religious retirement" on Iona, was succeeded by Maccus mac Arailt, who was probably his nephew. (Note: Gregory (1881) records Maccus mac Arailt's succession as taking place on the death of Amlaíb Cuarán, which took place in 981, although it may have been after his abdication as King of Dublin in 980; Downham (2007) has this occurring in the 970s.) Maccus's brother Gofraid mac Arailt then succeeded him. During their lifetimes these two "sons of Harald" are known to have launched at least two major expeditions against Ireland, and the latter is recorded as having won "the battle of Man" in 987. Iona was sacked twice, in 986 and 987, Amlaíb Cuarán's later piety notwithstanding. This battle of Man, recorded by the Annals of Ulster, is said to have been won by Gofraid and "the Danes" – possibly forces directly from Scandinavia under the command of Olaf Tryggvason. The Annals of Ulster record Gofraid's death in Dalriada in 989, describing him as "king of Innse Gall" although it is not clear if this was a completely new term or had originally been used earlier, perhaps to refer to Amlaíb Cuarán's island kingdom. (Note: Innse Gall, meaning "islands of the foreigners or strangers", is a name originally used by mainland Highlanders when the Hebrides were ruled by the Norse and is still occasionally used by Gaelic speakers today to mean the Hebrides/Outer Hebrides. The 9th-century Irish Cath Maige Tuired also refers to "Balor grandson of Nét, the king of the Hebrides and to Indech son of Dé Domnand, the king of the Fomoire". Fomoire is probably the Outer Hebrides and the text also refers to "a hInnsib Gall".) The complex geography of western Scotland and the lack of written records makes certainty about the extent and nature of these kingdoms hard to fathom. For example, the Chronicle of the Kings of Alba indicates that almost all these kings who reigned from the mid-10th to the late 11th century were buried on Iona. This may mean that Iona and Mull lay either within or close to the emerging Kingdom of Scotland. Furthermore, two records in the Annals of Innisfallen hint that the Western Isles may not have been "organised into a kingdom or earldom" at this time but rather that they were "ruled by assemblies of freeholders who regularly elected lawmen to preside over their public affairs".

=== Earls of Orkney and kings of Dublin ===
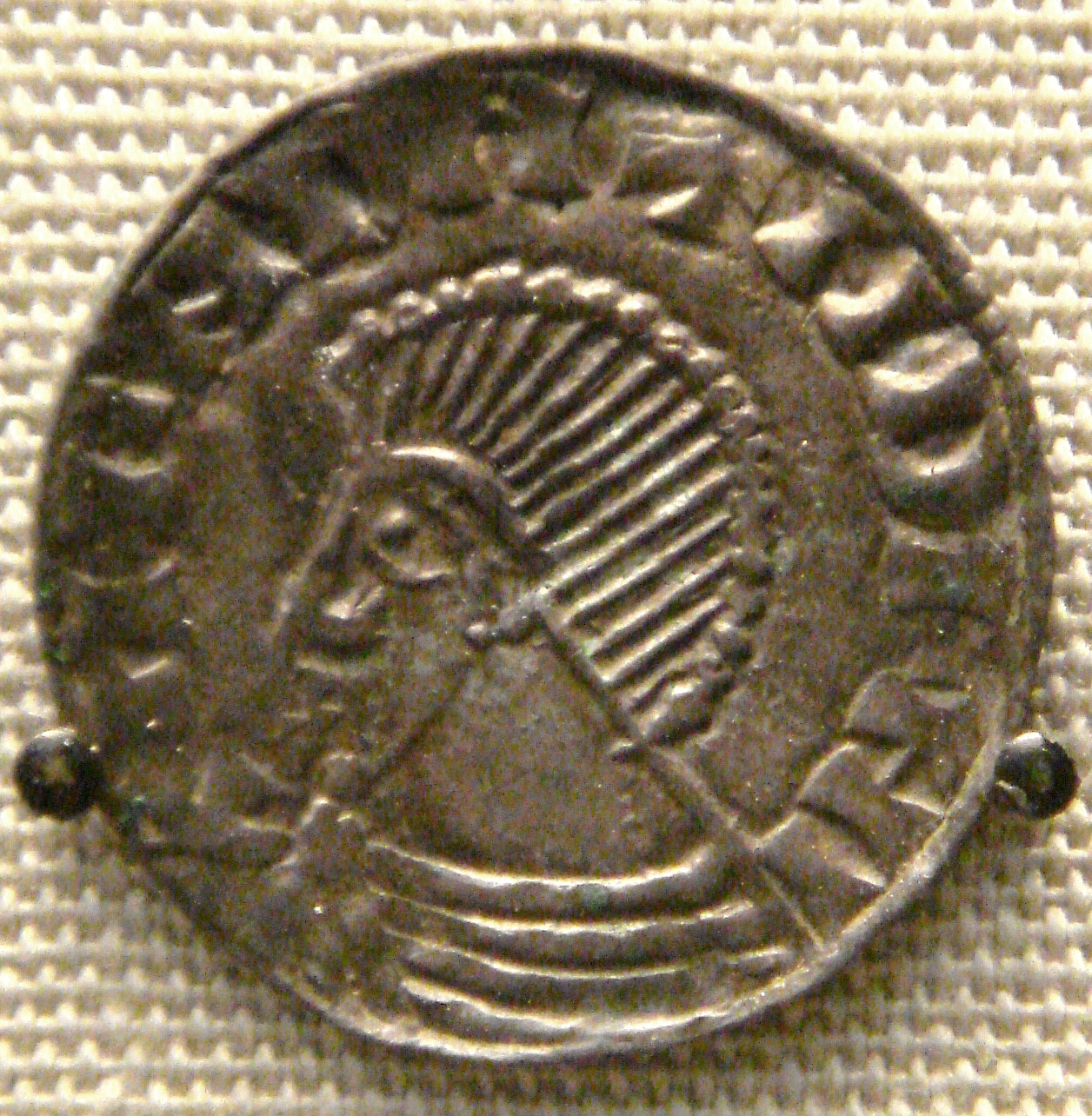
A posthumous "Sihtric" coin from the British Museum, minted at Dublin c. 1050

At this point the Orkneyinga Saga once again becomes the main source of information about the north. In 990 Sigurd the Stout, Earl of Orkney took control of the Hebrides, (Note: Ó Corráin (1998) states: "The historical Sigurðr was earl of Orkney and apparently was overlord of the Hebrides as well" although he provides no date.) and placed a jarl called Gilli in charge. By 1004 the isles' independence had been re-asserted under Gofraid's son Ragnal mac Gofraid, who died in that year. It is possible their rule overlapped, with Gilli's zone of influence to the north and Ragnal's to the south. On Ragnal's death Sigurd re-asserted control, which he held until his death at the Battle of Clontarf after which the islands may have been held by Hákon Eiríksson. According to the Welsh text Historia Grufudd vab Kenan Olaf Sigtryggsson is recorded as having been king of a wide variety of places on his death in 1034. These included the Isle of Man, "many of the other islands of Denmark", Galloway, the Rhinns, and Anglesey. Olaf was an Uí Ímair dynast and it is difficult to reconcile his rule with that of the Norwegians who apparently came before and after him according to the sagas. There is also an obscure reference in The Prophecy of Berchán hinting that King Máel Coluim mac Cináeda of Scotland may have been active in Islay and Arran at about this time, emphasising the potentially fluid nature of Scandinavian, Norse-Gael and Scots influence during this period.

The next recorded ruler is Sigurd the Stout's son Thorfinn the Mighty, who took control circa 1035 until his own death some two decades later. The continuing close alliance of the Isles with Norway is suggested by a record from the Annals of Tigernach for the year 1058: "A fleet was led by the son of the king of Norway, with the Gaill of Orkney, the Hebrides and Dublin, to seize the kingdom of England, but God consented not to this". This monarch of Norway was Magnus Haraldsson, who may have used the death of Thorfinn as an excuse to exert direct rule of Orkney and the Hebrides.

However, in the mid-11th century the Uí Ímair dynast Echmarcach mac Ragnaill is said to be the ruler of Mann. He was also King of Dublin from 1036 to 1038 and from 1046 to 1052 as well as possibly being the King of the Rhinns in Galloway, suggesting that the overlordship of the Isle of Man and the Hebrides were once again sundered (although it is possible he ruled over part or all of the Hebrides as well).

Murchad mac Diarmata from the Kingdom of Leinster is then recorded as having control of Mann and Dublin followed by his father Diarmait mac Maíl na mBó, the High King of Ireland, who took possession of Mann and the Isles until his death in 1072. Godred Sitricson and his son Fingal Godredson then ruled in Mann at least, but the records for the rulers of the Hebrides remain obscure until the arrival of Godred Crovan.

=== Godred Crovan and Irish influence ===
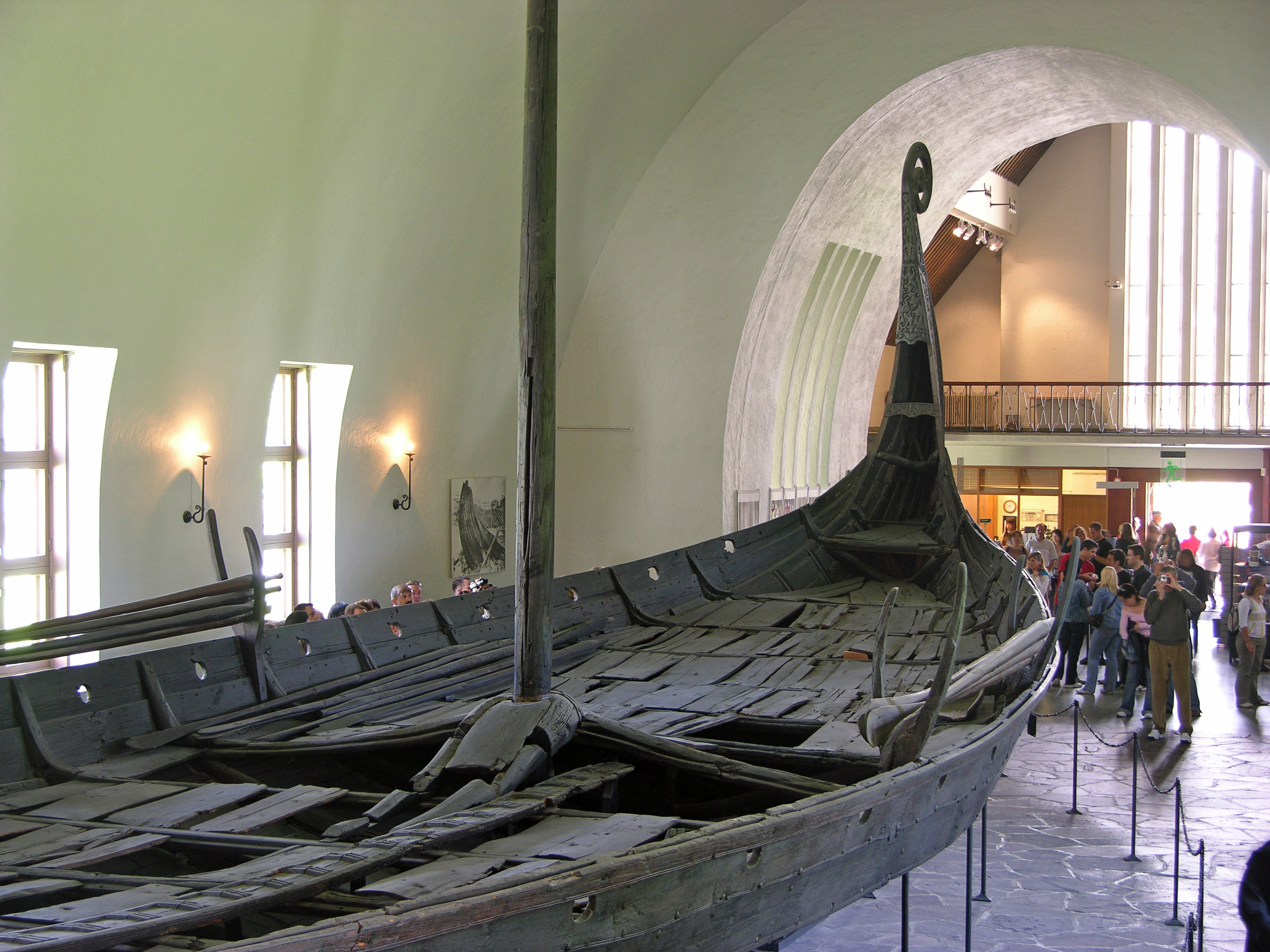
The preserved remains of the Oseberg ship in the Viking Ship Museum in Oslo.

"Crovan" probably means "white hand" although the reason is unknown and his origins are also uncertain. Godred may have been a son or nephew of Imar mac Arailt, King of Dublin and by extension a descendant of Amlaíb Cuarán. He was a survivor of Harald Hardraade's defeat at the Battle of Stamford Bridge in 1066 and fled from there to Man. Little is then heard of him until he succeeded in taking the island from Fingal in 1079, possibly with the help of troops from the Western Isles. The ancestor of many of the succeeding rulers of Mann and the Isles, he also became King of Dublin, but no contemporary source refers either to him or any of his predecessors as "King of Mann and the Isles" as such. (Note: Both Godred Crovan and Diarmait mac Maíl na mBó are described as "rig Atha Cliath & Inse Gall", i.e., the "King of Dublin and the Isles" a specific title given to no others, although other individuals were kings of both simultaneously.) He was eventually ousted from Dublin by Muirchertach Ua Briain and fled to Islay, where he died in the plague of 1095. (Note: Duffy (1992) then has the appointment of Domnall mac Taidc Ua Briain as regent from 1095 to 1098, not after Lagmann Godredsson in 1111.) It is not clear the extent to which Ui Briain dominance was now asserted in the islands north of Man, but growing Irish influence in these seas brought a rapid and decisive response from Norway. A high level of political instability is suggested by the battle fought on the Isle of Man at Santwat in 1098. This was internal strife between the men of the north of the island under Jarl Óttar, and the southerners led by a man named MacManus or Macmaras.

== Later history ==
=== Norse and Uí Briain influence ===
Perhaps as a result of general disorder in the islands, and to counter Irish influence there, Magnus Barefoot had re-established direct Norwegian overlordship by 1098. He first took Orkney, the northern Scottish mainland and the Hebrides, where he "dyed his sword red in blood" in the Uists. According to the Heimskringla, Magnus had his longship dragged across the isthmus north of Kintyre in 1093 as part of his campaign. By taking command of his ship's tiller and "sailing" across the isthmus he was able to claim the entire peninsula was an island, and it remained under Norwegian rule for more than a dozen years as a result.

In 1098, Edgar of Scotland signed a treaty with Magnus that settled much of the boundary between the Scots and Norwegian claims in the islands. Edgar formally acknowledged the existing situation by giving up his claims to the Hebrides and Kintyre.

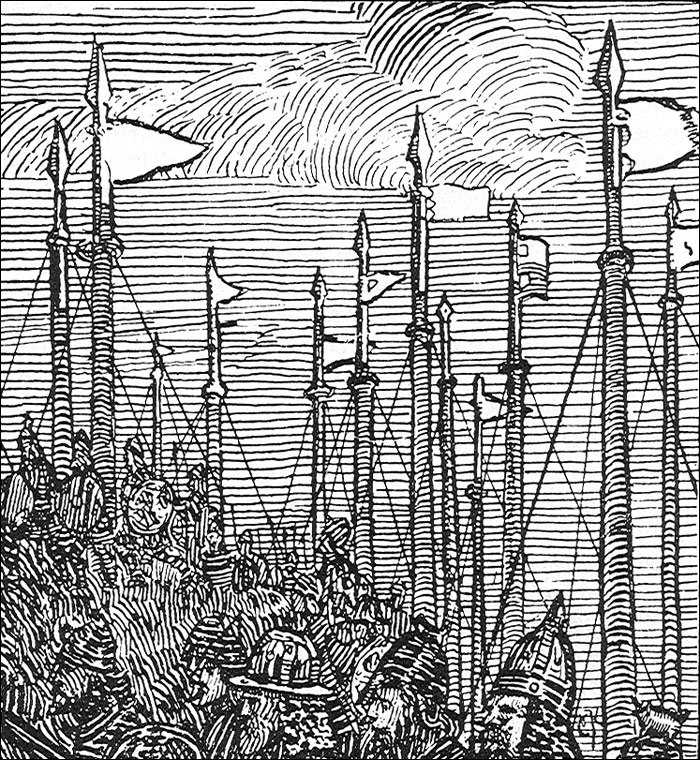
Magnus Barefoot's forces in Ireland.

A second expedition in 1102 saw incursions into Ireland; the Heimskringla saga reports that he obtained Muirchertach Ua Briain's daughter Bjaðmunjo in marriage to his young son, Sigurd, whom he then left in nominal charge of the isles. This arrangement did not last long. On 23 August 1103 Magnus was killed fighting in Ulster and the 14-year-old Sigurd returned to Norway without his bride. The next king was Lagmann Godredsson, Godred Crovan's son, who was apparently appointed with Sigurd's consent. He successfully fought off a rebellion by his brother Harald and after reigning for seven years he abdicated "repenting that he had put out his brother's eyes" and went on a pilgrimage to Jerusalem, where he died. (Note: Some sources have Lagmann reigning before Magnus's expedition and being deposed by him. See for example Anderson (1922) p. 108.)

Lagmann abdicated during his surviving son Olave's minority, and either by force or the invitation of the nobility of the Isles Domnall mac Taidc Ua Briain (Domnall MacTade O'Brien), a grandson of Echmarcach mac Ragnaill, became overlord of the isles in 1111. (Note: Duffy (1992), who suggests this may have been Domnall mac Taidc's second period of rule, believes it was probably in opposition to his uncle and High King, Muirchertach Ua Briain although Gregory (1881) states that he was sent by him on request. The Chronicle of Man and the Sudreys refers to the latter idea.) Whatever his route to accession, he proved to be an unpopular tyrant and was expelled by the Islesmen after two years, fleeing to Ireland.

Two years later Sigurd attempted to appoint Ingemund (whose background is unknown) to take possession of the kingdom of the Isles. However, when Ingemund arrived on Lewis he sent messengers to all the chiefs of the Isles to summon them to assemble and declare him king. In the meantime he and his followers spent the time in "plundering and revelling. They violated girls and matrons, and gave themselves up to every species of pleasure amid sensual gratification. When the news reached the chiefs of the Isles, who had already assembled to appoint him king, they were inflamed with great rage, hastened against him, and coming upon him in the night, set fire to the house in which he was, and destroyed, partly by the sword and partly by the flames, Ingemund and all his followers."

The next recorded king was Godred Crovan's son Olave Godredsson, also known as "the Red" to the Highlanders and "Bitling" to the Norwegians, the latter apparently on account of his small size. He had spent time at the court of Henry I of England, who may have encouraged his ambitions in an attempt to minimise Ui Briain dominance over the Irish Sea and environs. Olave reigned for forty years, managing to maintain a degree of peace and stability throughout. Nevertheless, the era was not without incident. During his time Oitir Mac mic Oitir, one of the Hebridean nobles, took Dublin by force and held it for six years before his assassination in 1148. Oitir's son Thorfinn was described as the most powerful of the Hebridean lords in 1150. In 1152 Olave's nephews in Dublin rose against him and attacked Man, killing him in the process.

Olave's son Godred the Black succeeded him and had his father's killers executed. Shortly thereafter the warring Mac Lochlainn clan in Ireland along with "the fleet of Galloway, Arran, Kintyre, Man, and the territories of Scotland" are recorded fighting a naval battle off Inishowen against the Ui Briain dynasty. During his reign the citizens of Dublin offered Godred the rule of the city, which he accepted. Then, according to the Manx Chronicle, he inflicted a heavy defeat on his erstwhile Mac Lochlainn allies, following which he and his chieftains returned to the islands, leaving the city to the invading forces of Diarmait Mac Murchada. (Note: The Annals of Ulster place the battle at the unidentified location of Mag Fitharta in 1162, and thus possibly in the time of Somerled.)

=== Somerled ===
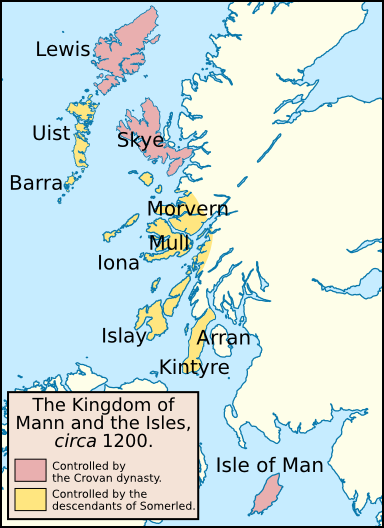
The Suðreyjar in about 1200: the lands of the Crovan dynasty and the descendants of Somerled.

Godred's dictatorial style appears to have made him very unpopular with the Islesmen, and the ensuing conflicts were the beginning of the end for Mann and the Isles as a coherent territory under the rule of a single magnate. The powerful barons of the isles began plotting with an emerging and forceful figure – Somerled, Lord of Argyll. Somerled's parental origins are obscure, but it is known that he had married Ragnhildis , daughter of Olave the Red and Godred's half-sister. It is possible that Somerled first found favour with Olave by helping him wrest control of the northern Hebrides from the Earls of Orkney, whose influence had once more spread into the Sudreys. Somerled's popularity led to his son with Ragnhildis, Dubgall, being heralded throughout the Isles (save Man itself) as a future King of the Isles by "Thorfinn, son of Ottar". When Godred heard of this he engaged Somerled's forces in the naval Battle of Epiphany in 1156. There was no clear victor, but it was subsequently agreed that Godred would remain the ruler of Man, the northern Inner Hebrides and the Outer Hebrides, whilst Somerled's young sons would nominally control the southern Inner Hebrides, Kintyre and the islands of the Clyde under their father's supervision. Two years later Somerled's invasion of the Isle of Man caused Godred to flee to Norway, leaving the former as undisputed ruler of the entire realm.

The Hebrides had been difficult to control from a distance since the days of Ketill Flatnose, and even in the time of Magnus Barelegs it is likely that de facto control was that of local rulers rather than nominal governance from over the seas. Somerled took this to its ultimate conclusion, declaring himself an independent ruler of the isles from his power base in the southern Hebrides and Kintyre and he had, in effect, recreated Dalriada. There has been some debate about the source of legitimacy Somerled used. It has been suggested that claims of his descent from Gofraid mac Fergusa are "preserved in Gaelic tradition and accepted as broadly authentic by modern scholars". However, Woolf (2005) asserts that "contrary to the image, projected by recent clan-historians, of Clann Somhairle as Gaelic nationalists liberating the Isles from Scandinavians, it is quite explicit in our two extended narrative accounts from the thirteenth century, Orkneyinga saga and The Chronicle of the Kings of Man and the Isles, that the early leaders of Clann Somhairle saw themselves as competitors for the kingship of the Isles on the basis of their descent through their mother Ragnhilt" and that their claim "to royal status was based on its position as a segment of Uí Ímair". This prince of Argyll is one of the best known historical figures from the Gàidhealtachd of Scotland, and is known in Gaelic as Somairle mac Gille Brigte, although his Norse name, Somarlidi, has the literal meaning of "summer traveller", a common name for a Viking. (Note: The full Norse name was Somarlidi Haulldr, literally, "summer traveller" and "cultivator of the soil". The latter may imply a lack of noble birth although it was also a nickname commonly used of the nobility.)

Somerled met his death in 1164, possibly assassinated in his tent as he camped near Renfrew during an invasion of the Scottish mainland. At this point Godred re-took possession of his pre-1158 territories and the southern isles were distributed amongst Somerled's sons as previously agreed: Dubgall received Mull, Coll, Tiree and Jura; Islay and Kintyre went to Raghnall; Bute to Aonghas, with Arran possibly divided between him and Reginald. Dugall and Raghnall at least were styled "Kings of the Isles". However, their descendants do not seem to have held this title and The Chronicle of Man and the Sudreys lamented that Somerled's marriage to Ragnhildis "was the cause of the ruin of the whole kingdom of the Isles".

=== A divided kingdom ===
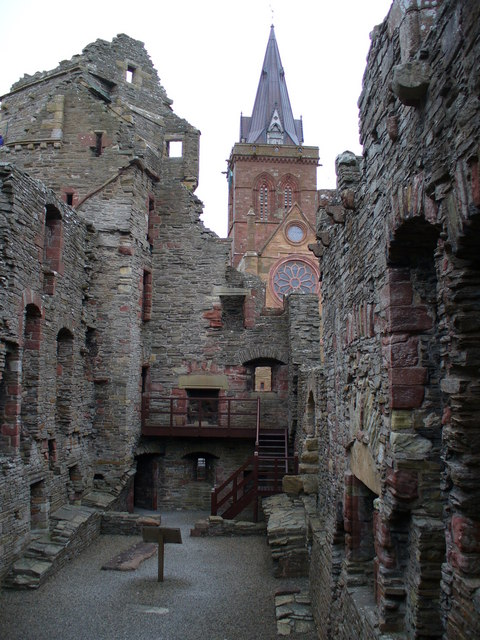
The Bishop's Palace, Kirkwall in Orkney where Haakon Haakonarson, the last Norwegian king to rule over the Suðreyjar died in 1263. The spire of St Magnus Cathedral can be seen in the background.

Somerled's descendants eventually became known as the Lords of the Isles, with Dubgall giving rise to Clan MacDougall, and Raghnall to Clan Donald and Clan Macruari. Aonghas and his three sons were killed on Skye in 1210. In theory Somerled and his descendants' island territories were subject to Norway and his mainland ones to the Kingdom of Alba, whilst the Kings of Mann and the North Isles were vassals of the Kings of Norway.

However, both during and after Somerled's life the Scottish monarchs sought to take control of the islands he and his descendants held. Diplomacy having failed to achieve much, in 1249 Alexander II took personal command of a large fleet that sailed from the Firth of Clyde and anchored off the island of Kerrera. Alexander became ill and died there, but the action was continued by his successor Alexander III. This strategy eventually led to an invasion by Haakon Haakonarson, King of Norway. After the stalemate of the Battle of Largs, Haakon retreated to Orkney, where he died in December 1263, entertained on his death bed by recitations of the sagas. Following this ill-fated expedition, the Hebrides and Mann and all rights that the Norwegian crown "had of old therein" were yielded to the Kingdom of Scotland as a result of the 1266 Treaty of Perth.

In Man, having overcome his usurper brother Ragnald who reigned for a brief time in 1164, Godred the Black resumed his kingship of Mann and the North Isles. On his death in 1187, the kingship passed to his eldest son, Raghnall mac Gofraidh, rather than his chosen successor, Olaf the Black (Raghnall's half-brother), who instead became overlord of Lewis. In 1228, Olaf battled Raghnall at Tynwald and the latter was slain. On 21 May 1237, Olaf died on St Patrick's Isle, and was succeeded by his three sons who all ruled the kingdom in turn: Harald (reigned 1237–1248), Ragnvald (1249), and Magnus (1252–1265). Magnus Olafsson was the last of the Norse kings to rule Mann, which was absorbed into the Kingdom of Scotland on his death.

== Life in Norse times ==
As with written records, the archaeological evidence for this period is not extensive, and knowledge of the daily lives of the population is lacking. It is known that the Hebrides were taxed using the Ounceland system and evidence from Bornais suggests that settlers there may have been more prosperous than families of a similar status in the Northern Isles, possibly owing to a more relaxed political regime. Latterly, the Hebrides sent eight representatives from Lewis, Harris and Skye and another eight from the southern Hebrides to the Tynwald parliament on Man.

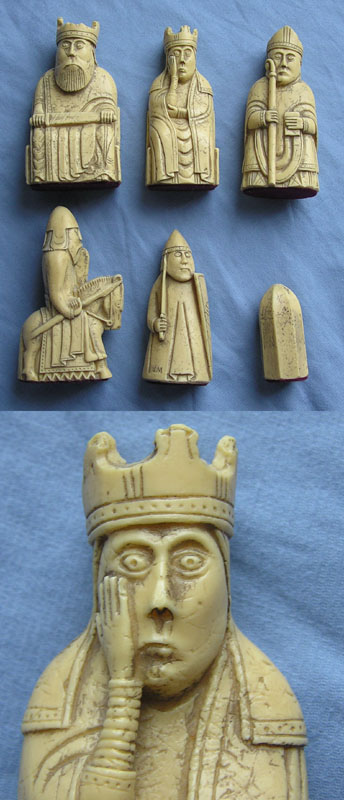
The Lewis chessmen; Top Row: King; Queen, Bishop Bottom Row:Knight; Rook & Pawn

Colonsay and Oronsay have produced important pagan Norse burial grounds. An 11th-century cross slab decorated with Irish and Ringerike Viking art found on Islay was found in 1838. Rubha an Dùnain, today an uninhabited peninsula to the south of the Cuillin hills on Skye, contains the small Loch na h-Airde, which is connected to the sea by a short artificial canal. This loch was an important site for maritime activity for many centuries, spanning the Viking and later periods of Scottish clan rule. There is a stone-built quay and a system to maintain constant water levels. Boat timbers discovered there have been dated to the 12th century. Only three rune stones are known from the west coast of Scotland, on Christian memorials found on Barra, Inchmarnock and Iona.

Gaelic continued to exist as a spoken language in the southern Hebrides throughout the Norse settlement period, but place-name evidence suggests it had a lowly status. The obliteration of pre-Norse names is almost total. There is little continuity of style between Pictish pottery in the north and that of the early Viking period. The similarities that do exist suggests the later pots may have been made by Norse who had settled in Ireland, or by Irish slaves. In the Firth of Clyde, Norse burials have been found on Arran, although not on Bute, and place-name evidence suggests a settlement pattern that was much less well-developed than in the Hebrides. There are numerous Manx Runestones and place names of Norse origin on the Isle of Man.

Initially a pagan culture, detailed information about the return of the Christian religion to the islands during the Norse-era is elusive, although the modern-day Diocese of Sodor and Man retains the centuries-old name.

== See also ==
- Duke of Argyll
- Kings of Jorvik
- List of Manx consorts
- List of rulers of the Kingdom of the Isles
- Lord of Mann
- Lords of Galloway
