= Maccus mac Arailt =

- King of the Isles
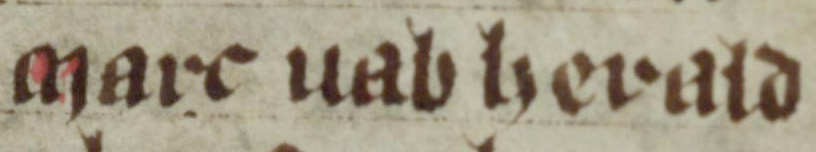
- Maccus' name as it appears on page 59r of Oxford Jesus College 111 (the Red Book of Hergest): "Marc uab herald".
- Successor: Gofraid mac Arailt
- Dynasty: Uí Ímair (probably)
- Father: Aralt mac Sitriuc (probably)

Maccus mac Arailt (fl. 971–974), or Maccus Haraldsson, was a tenth-century King of the Isles. (Note: Since the 1980s, academics have accorded Maccus various patronyms in English secondary sources: Maccus Haraldsson, Maccus Háraldsson, Maccus Haroldson, Maccus mac Arailt, Maccus Mac Arailt, Magnúis Haraldsson, Magnus Haraldsson, Magnús Haraldsson, Magnus mac Arailt, and Magnus mac Arallt.) Although his parentage is uncertain, surviving evidence suggests that he was the son of Harald Sigtryggson, also known as Aralt mac Sitriuc, the Hiberno-Norse King of Limerick. Maccus' family is known as the Meic Arailt kindred. He and his brother, Gofraid, are first recorded in the 970s. It was during this decade and the next that they conducted military operations against the Welsh of Anglesey, apparently taking advantage of dynastic strife within the Kingdom of Gwynedd.

The Meic Arailt violence during this period could account for Maccus' participation in a royal assembly convened by Edgar, King of the English. Maccus may have been regarded as a potential threat by not only the English and Welsh kings, but also the rulers of the Kingdom of Strathclyde. Perhaps as a consequence of this convention, the Meic Arailt thereafter turned their attention to Ireland. In 974, Maccus defeated and captured Ímar, King of Limerick. Gofraid resumed the family's campaigning against the Welsh before the end of the decade. In 984, the Meic Arailt appear to have formed an alliance with the family of Brian mac Cennétig, King of Munster. Whether Maccus was alive by this date is unknown. He does not appear on record after this date, and seems to have been succeeded by his brother. Gofraid is the first King of the Isles to be identified as such by Irish sources.

== Family ==
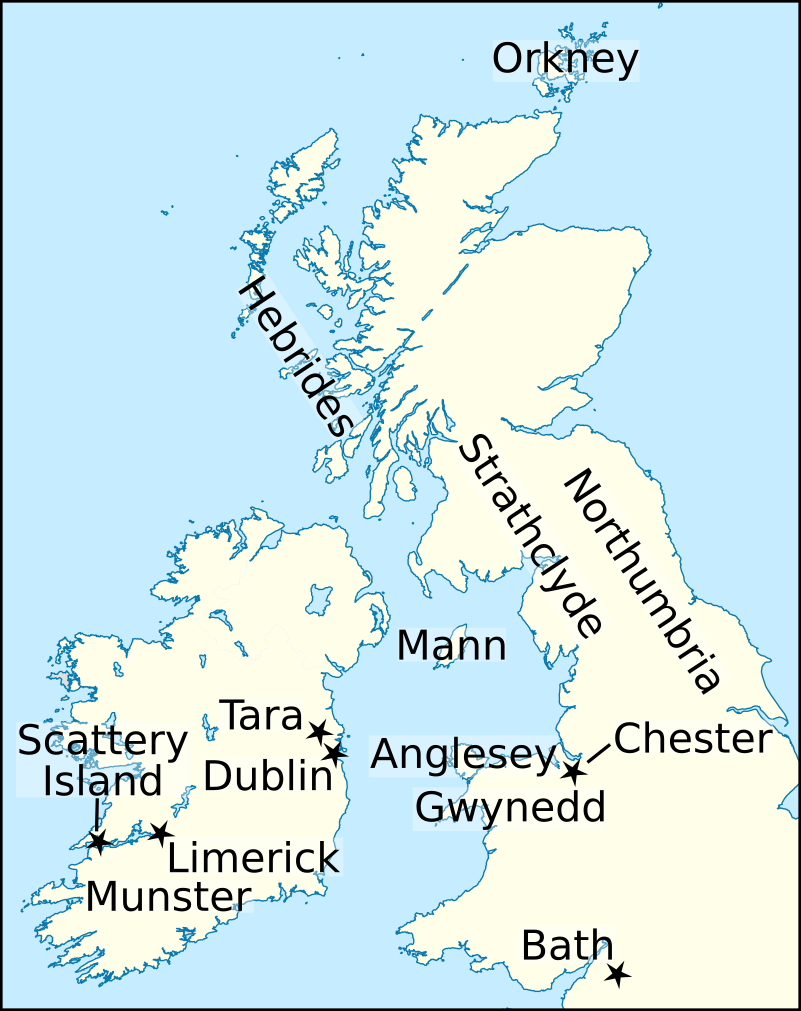
Locations relating to Maccus' life and times.

Maccus was a member of the Meic Arailt kindred, although his exact parentage is uncertain. Surviving evidence suggests that Maccus' father was probably Aralt mac Sitriuc, King of Limerick. Such a relationship would mean that Maccus was a member of the Uí Ímair. Alternate possibilities—lacking specific evidence—are that Maccus was a son of Hagrold, a Danish warlord active in Normandy; or a son of Haraldr Gormsson, King of Denmark.

Maccus appears to have been an elder brother of Gofraid mac Arailt. A sister of Maccus and Gofraid, or perhaps a daughter of the latter, may have been Máel Muire, wife of Gilla Pátraic mac Donnchada, King of Osraige. Specific evidence of a familial relationship between Máel Muire and the Meic Arailt may be preserved by the twelfth-century Banshenchas, a source that identifies the mother of Gilla Pátraic's son, Donnchad, as Máel Muire, daughter of a certain Aralt mac Gofraid. One possibility is that this source has erroneously reversed the patronym of Maccus' brother. Another brother of Maccus may have been Eiríkr Haraldsson, a Viking who ruled the Kingdom of Northumbria in the mid part of the tenth century. Although non-contemporary Scandinavian sources identify this figure with the like-named Norwegian royal Eiríkr blóðøx, there is reason to suspect that these sources have erroneously conflated two different individuals, and that the former was a member of the insular Uí Ímair.

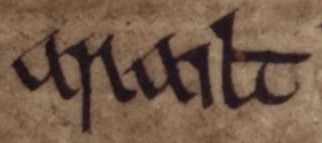
The name of Maccus' probable father, Aralt mac Sitriuc, as it appears on folio 17r of Oxford Bodleian Library Rawlinson B 503 (the Annals of Inisfallen): "Arailt".

There is uncertainty surrounding Maccus' name. Although the nineteenth-century edition of the seventeenth-century Annals of the Four Masters refers to him as Maghnus mac Arailt, suggesting that the Gaelic Maccus is a form of the Old Norse Magnús—itself a borrowing of the Latin Magnus—the oldest manuscript forms of this source show that the recorded name was actually an abbreviated form of Maccus. Besides this mistranscription, Maccus is not accorded the name Magnus by any historical source, and his name is unlikely to refer to it. Maccus' name may instead be of Gaelic origin. (Note: The personal name Magnús first appears on record in Scandinavia in the eleventh century, in the person of Magnús Óláfsson, King of Norway.)

== Irruption into the Irish Sea region ==
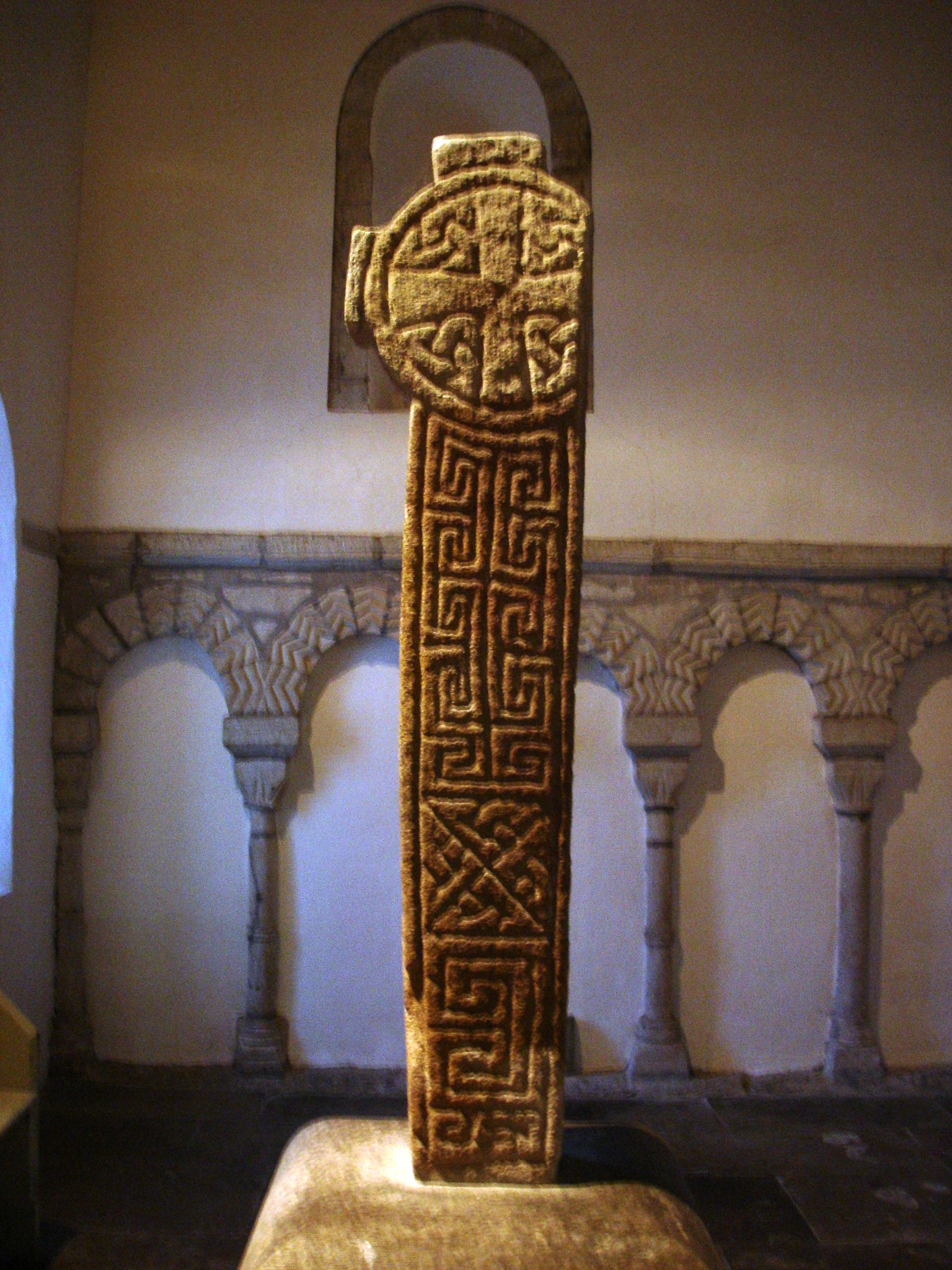
One of two near-contemporary crosses at Penmon. The crosses are evidence that Penmon was the site of a significant ecclesiastical centre on Anglesey, and the multicultural artistry displayed upon them exemplifies the fact that Anglesey was part of the Irish Sea cultural zone.

The Meic Arailt first appear on record in the Irish Sea in the 970s. The power of the family seems to have been centred in the Isles, and may have been based upon control of the important trade routes through the Irish Sea region. If the Meic Arailt were indeed centred in the Hebrides, the family's apparent ambition to secure control of Mann could account for its campaigning against the Welsh on Anglesey. The latter island was the traditional seat of the kings of Gwynedd, and control of it may have been sought by the Meic Arailt as a way to further ensure the control of the surrounding sea-lanes.

According to the "B" version of the eleventh- to thirteenth-century Annales Cambriæ, an unidentified son of Aralt wasted this island off the north-west Welsh coast. The thirteenth- and fourteenth-century texts Brut y Tywysogyon and Brenhinedd y Saesson corroborate this record and identify the attacker as Maccus himself. (Note: Maccus' name is rendered "Marc uab herald" by the Red Book of Hergest version of Brut y Tywysogyon, and "madoc ap harald" by the Peniarth version.) Maccus' assault targeted Penmon on the eastern coast of the island. Several near-contemporary engraved crosses at Penmon indicate that it was a significant ecclesiastical site with important patrons. Both Brut y Tywysogyon and Brenhinedd y Saesson further reveal that Gofraid attacked Anglesey the next year, and thereby brought the island under his control. (Note: Early mediaeval burials uncovered at Llanbedrgoch on could be evidence of Manx-based Viking activity on Anglesey.) At the time of the Meic Arailt kindred's attacks, the Kingdom of Gwynedd was in the midst of a vicious civil war triggered by the death of Rhodri ab Idwal Foel, King of Gwynedd in 969, a fact which could indicate that the Meic Arailt purposely sought to capitalise on this infighting.

== Amongst an assembly of kings ==
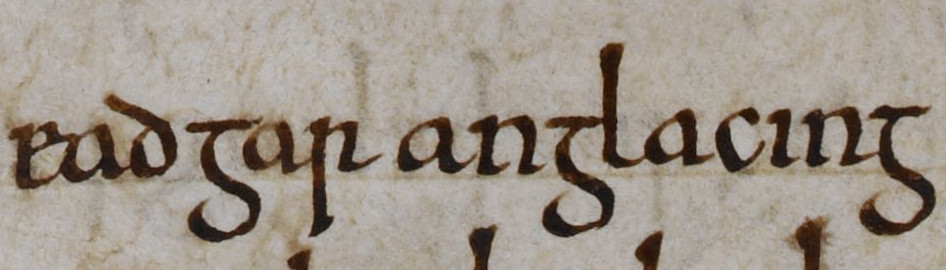
The name of Edgar as it appears on folio 142v of British Library Cotton Tiberius B I (the "C" version of the Anglo-Saxon Chronicle): "Eadgar Angla cing".

There is evidence indicating that Maccus was amongst the assembled kings who are recorded to have met with Edgar, King of the English at Chester in 973. According to the "D", "E", and "F" versions of the Anglo-Saxon Chronicle, after having been consecrated king that year, this English monarch assembled a massive naval force and met with six kings at Chester. By the tenth century, the number of kings who met with him was alleged to have been eight, as evidenced by the tenth-century Life of St Swithun. (Note: The "C" version of Annales Cambriæ merely reports a great gathering of ships at Chester by Edgar.) By the twelfth century, the eight kings began to be named and were alleged to have rowed Edgar down the River Dee, as evidenced by sources such as the twelfth-century texts Chronicon ex chronicis, Gesta regum Anglorum, and De primo Saxonum adventu, as well as the thirteenth-century Chronica majora, and both the Wendover and Paris versions of Flores historiarum.

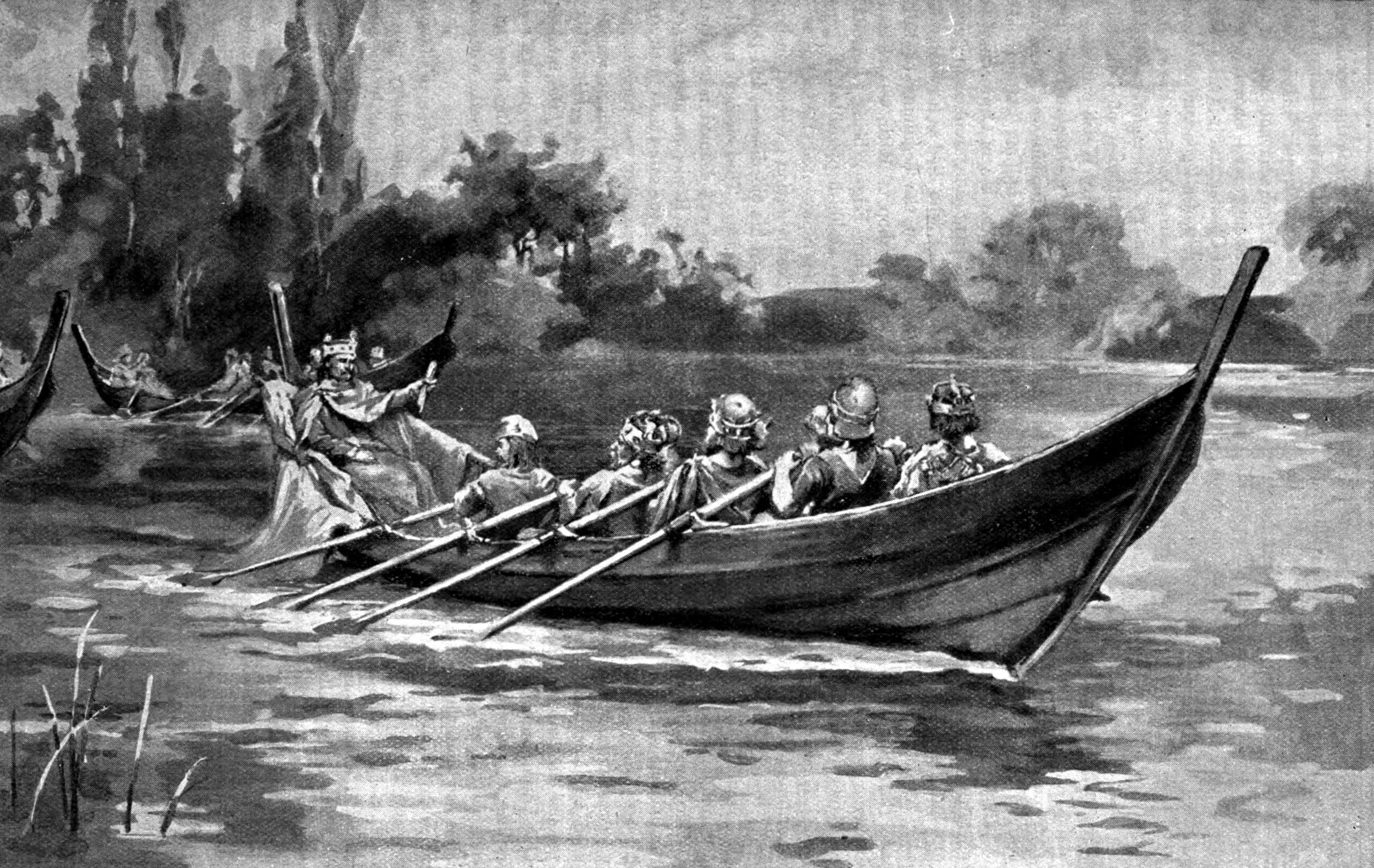
An early twentieth-century depiction of Edgar being rowed down the River Dee by eight kings. According to the Anglo-Saxon Chronicle, Edgar met six kings at Chester. By the twelfth century, chroniclers alleged that eight kings rowed Edgar down the river in an act of submission. One of these eight seems to have been Maccus himself.

Whilst one of the named kings appears to have been Maccus himself, a certain other—named Siferth by Gesta regum Anglorum, and Giferth by Chronicon ex chronicis—could have been Gofraid. Gesta regum Anglorum describes Maccus as archipirata ("prince of the pirates" or "pirate king"), whilst Chronicon ex chronicis, De primo Saxonum adventu, and the twelfth- to thirteenth-century Chronicle of Melrose (which also notes the assembly) call him plurimarum rex insularum ("king of many islands" or "king of very many islands"). The titles associated with Maccus appear to relate to a similar one—multarum insularum rex ("king of many islands")—earlier accorded to Amlaíb mac Gofraid, King of Dublin by Chronicon ex chronicis.

The precise reasons for Edgar's assembly are uncertain. It came on the heels of a royal crowning ceremony at Bath, and could have been orchestrated as a way to project imperial authority over Edgar's neighbours. With a grand show of force, Edgar may have sought to demonstrate this authority, and thereby resolve certain outstanding issues with his neighbouring rulers. There is reason to suspect that the upsurge in Viking activity in the 960s/970s, and the emergence of the Meic Arailt in the region, may have factored in Edgar's machinations. Specifically, one aspect of the assembly may have concerned the ongoing warring between the Meic Arailt and the Welsh. Such conflict could have posed a significant threat to the English trade routes in the region, and Edgar may have sought an understanding with Maccus to ensure the safety of important sea-lanes shared with the Islesmen. The threat of international collusion could have also factored into Edgar's assembly. One possibility is that he may have acted to ensure that the Islesmen would not be tempted to lend support to discontented elements in the English Danelaw. It is also conceivable that the assembly could have concerned the remarkable rising power of Amlaíb Cúarán in Ireland. Edgar may have moved to resolve the strife between the Meic Arailt and the Welsh as a way to limit the prospect of any encroachment by Amlaíb Cúarán into the Irish Sea region. This reigning King of Dublin was a leading member of the Uí Ímair, and may have been a rival to the Meic Arailt. By easing tensions between the Meic Arailt and the Welsh, Edgar could have sought to gain their allegiance against Amlaíb Cúarán's ambitions of authority in the area, and further offset any attempt by Amlaíb Cúarán to attain an alliance with the Scots and Cumbrians against the English.

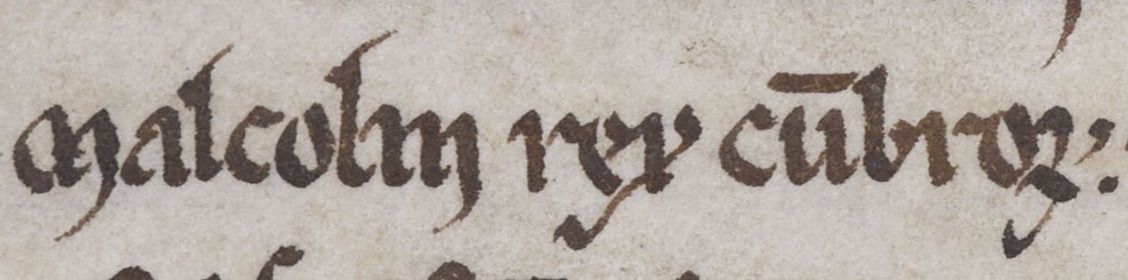
The name of Máel Coluim, King of Strathclyde as it appears on folio 5v of British Library Cotton Domitian A VIII (De primo Saxonum adventu): "Malcolm rex Cumbrorum".

The fact that Brenhinedd y Saesson reports that Gofraid subdued Anglesey and placed it under tribute could indicate that the Meic Arailt were attempting to establish themselves in Britain, and could indicate that the Meic Arailt participated in the assembly in this context. If Maccus was in possession of Mann in the 970s the record of Edgar's assembled fleet could have been a response to the perceived threat that Maccus posed. As such, the episode could well be an example of tenth-century gunboat diplomacy. Other royal attendees of the summit meeting appear to have been Dyfnwal ab Owain, and Dyfnwal's son Máel Coluim, men who represented the Cumbrian Kingdom of Strathclyde. (Note: If it was not Dyfnwal who attended the assembly, another possibility is that the like-named figure who did was Domnall ua Néill, King of Tara.) It is probable that the power of the Meic Arailt posed a serious threat to the rulers of this northern British realm, and may explain their own part in the assembly. One possible result of the conference is that Edgar recognised Maccus' lordship in the Isles in return for his acceptance of English overlordship. Although Maccus appears as a witness in two alleged royal charters of Edgar, these appear to be forgeries.

== Later career ==
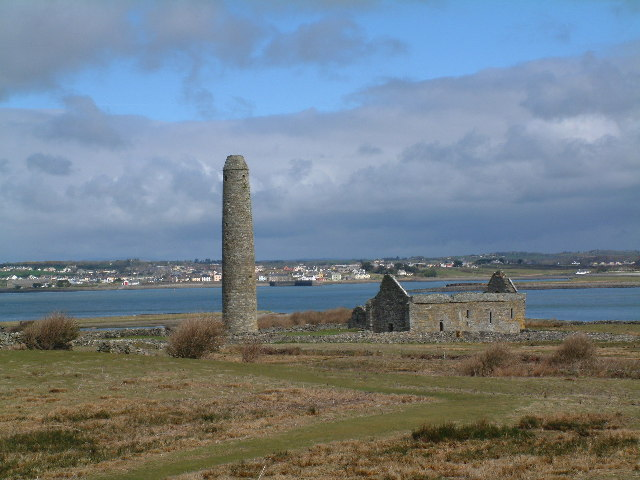
The remaining monastic ruins on Scattery Island include a round tower and church building.

Whatever the reasons behind the assembly, the Meic Arailt violence in the region was temporarily abated—perhaps as a consequence of the conference—and the kindred turned its attention westwards towards Ireland.

In 974, the eleventh- to fourteenth-century Annals of Inisfallen and the Annals of the Four Masters reveal that Maccus—accompanied by the lagmainn ("lawmen") of the Isles—attacked Scattery Island and captured Ímar, King of Limerick. Ímar appears to have gained the kingship of Limerick in the 960s. If Maccus was indeed a son of Aralt, Maccus' move against Ímar in 974 would appear to corroborate this kinship. For instance, Maccus' attack could have been undertaken in the context of regaining what he regarded as his patrimony, since Ímar's accession in Limerick was conceivably accomplished at the expense of Aralt's progeny.

It is possible that Ímar was in control of Limerick in 969, and may have controlled the town in 972, when the Munstermen are recorded to have expelled the Viking ruling elite. If correct, Ímar's return to power could explain the Meic Arailt kindred's actions against him. Maccus may have ransomed Ímar to the Limerickmen, or Ímar may have escaped his captors. Certainly the Annals of Inisfallen reports that Ímar "escaped over sea" the following year. In any event, Ímar next appears on record three years later when he and his two sons were slain by Brian mac Cennétig, King of Munster. (Note: Scattery Island was an ecclesiastical site, and the records of Ímar's defeats on the island appear to indicate that it served as a refuge of the kings of Limerick in times of political upheaval.) In 967, Brian's brother, Mathgamain mac Cennétig, is reported to have attacked Limerick. If the eleventh- or twelfth-century Cogad Gáedel re Gallaib is to be believed, Ímar played a role in slaying Mathgamain the year before his own death at Brian's hands. As such, the Meic Arailt and Brian's family appear to have shared a common enemy in the person of Ímar.

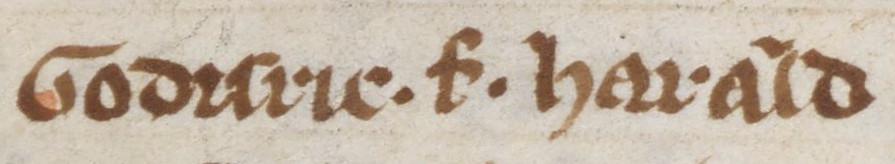
The name of Maccus' brother, Gofraid mac Arailt, as it appears on folio 141v of British Library Cotton Domitian A I (the "C" version of Annales Cambriæ): "Godisric filius harald".

The record of Maccus' attack is the second such notice of lagmainn in the Isles. Earlier in 962, the Annals of the Four Masters reports that the lagmainn and the Meic Amlaíb—seemingly the descendants of Amlaíb mac Gofraid—attacked several sites in Ireland. Such lawmen appear to have been elective representatives from the Hebrides, and these annal-entries could be evidence that leading figures in the Irish Sea region received formal support from the Hebrides. (Note: The Gaelic term lagmainn is derived from the Old Norse lǫgmenn ("lawmen").) Following Maccus' campaigning against Ímar, nothing is recorded of the Meic Arailt until the 980s. In 984, the Annals of Inisfallen reports that the Meic Arailt contracted an alliance with Brian's family, and exchanged hostages with them in an apparent agreement pertaining to military cooperation against the Kingdom of Dublin. This compact seems to indicate that Brian's family sought to align the Vikings of the Isles against those of Dublin.

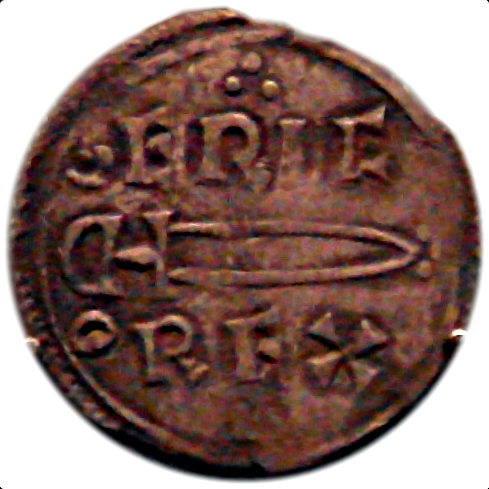
A coin of Eiríkr Haraldsson. Although this figure is identified as Eiríkr blóðøx by non-contemporary Scandinavian sources, there is reason to suspect that he was a brother of Maccus and Gofraid. Certainly, the sword-emblem upon the coin seems to imitate that borne upon coins of the brothers' apparent grandfather, Sitriuc Cáech. (Note: If Eiríkr Haraldsson was indeed a member of the Uí Ímair, one possibility is that the sword-emblem represents the "Sword of Carlus", an apparent part of Dublin's royal regalia.)

Maccus' brother eventually resumed the Meic Arailt attacks upon the Welsh. According to the Peniarth version of Brut y Tywysogyon, a certain Gwrmid—a man who may be identical to Gofraid—ravaged Llŷn in 978. The Red Book of Hergest version of Brut y Tywysogyon reports that Gofraid, along with the exiled Venedotian prince Custennin ab Iago, ravaged Llŷn and Anglesey in 980. The date of Maccus' death is unknown. Since he does not appear on record again, it is possible that he was dead by this date, and that Gofraid had succeeded him in the Isles. On the other hand, the record of the Meic Arailt assisting Brian's family in 984 could be evidence that Maccus was yet still active. In any case, Maccus is certainly unrecorded after 984. (Note: The disappearance of Maccus from the historical record in the 980s could indicate that he had either died or left the region. One possibility is that Maccus succumbed to plague. Two livestock epidemics are attested by Irish sources in the tenth century: one in 909, another in 987.) Gofraid's campaigning on Anglesey suggests that whatever authority the Meic Arailt gained over the Welsh in the 970s was only temporary. The fact that there is no record of Viking activity against the island between 972 and 980 suggests that the Meic Arailt's ambitions there had been fulfilled during this span.

In 980, Amlaíb Cúarán was utterly defeated by Máel Sechnaill mac Domnaill, King of Mide at the Battle of Tara, and retired to Iona where he died soon after. Whilst Islesmen are reported to have supported Amlaíb Cúarán's cause in the conflict, the Meic Arailt are not mentioned, and there is no specific evidence that they did so. On one hand, it is possible that the family supported Amlaíb Cúarán in the conflict. On the other hand, if evidence of contemporary Orcadian encroachment into the Isles is taken into account, there is reason to suspect that the Islesmen present in the conflict were adherents of the earls of Orkney, and did not include the Meic Arailt.

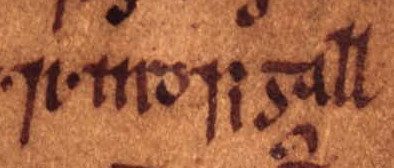
Gofraid's title as it appears on folio 15r of Oxford Bodleian Library Rawlinson B 488 (the Annals of Tigernach): ("rí Indsi Gall").

Maccus' brother is the first King of the Isles to recorded as such by Irish sources, when he was styled rí Innse Gall by the fifteenth- to sixteenth-century Annals of Ulster on his death in 989. The appearance of the kingdom at this time could indicate that the catalyst behind its emergence was Amlaíb Cúarán's defeat at Tara, the subsequent loss of Dublin to Máel Sechnaill's overlordship, and Amlaíb Cúarán's later demise. On one hand, the kingdom could have been a recent creation, perhaps a result of the Meic Arailt gaining overlordship over the Hebridean lagmainn. On the other hand, the first record of a King of the Isles in Irish sources may merely reflect the fact that Dublin had been lost to the Irish after having previously formed part of Amlaíb Cúarán's imperium. In any event, later apparent descendants of Gofraid competed with the descendants of Amlaíb Cúarán for control of a kingdom that encompassed the Hebrides and the Irish Sea region. (Note: The 980 obituary of Mugrón, Abbot of Iona, preserved by the seventeenth-century Annals of Roscrea, states that he presided over "the Three Parts". One possibility is that this location refers to Fine Gall (including Dublin), the Isles (including Mann), and the Rhinns. If correct, this record could also be evidence of the extent of Amlaíb Cúarán's realm.)
