= History of North Uist =

The island of North Uist in the Outer Hebrides of Scotland has a long and turbulent history. Settlement of the island dates back to the Neolithic period the evidence for which are the standing stones scattered throughout, including a stone circle at Pobull Fhinn and a large burial cairn, in almost pristine condition, at Barpa Langass. Written records however do not commence until the late first millennium AD.

== Kingdom of the Isles ==
North Uist was settled in the 9th century by Vikings, who established the Kingdom of the Isles throughout the Hebrides. Initially, Vikings built turf-based buildings; however, on the shore, the environmental and chemical composition of machair causes these buildings to rapidly degrade and turn mauve (Note: The distinctive purple colouring of their remains forms a useful marker for archaeologists). Following Norwegian unification, the Kingdom of the Isles became a crown dependency of the Norwegian king; to the Norwegians it was Suðreyjar (meaning "southern isles"). Malcolm III of Scotland acknowledged in writing that Suðreyjar was not Scottish, and King Edgar quitclaimed any residual doubts. However, in the mid-12th century, Somerled, a Norse-Gael of uncertain origin, launched a coup, which made Suðreyjar entirely independent. Following his death, Norwegian authority was nominally restored, but in practice, the kingdom was divided between Somerled's heirs (Clann Somhairle), and the dynasty that Somerled had deposed (the Crovan dynasty). The MacRory, a branch of Somerled's heirs, ruled Uist, as well as Barra, Eigg, Rùm, the Rough Bounds, Bute, Arran, and northern Jura. In the 13th century, despite Edgar's quitclaim, Scottish forces attempted to conquer parts of Suðreyjar, culminating in the indecisive Battle of Largs.

In 1266, the matter was settled by the Treaty of Perth, which transferred the whole of Suðreyjar to Scotland, in exchange for a very large sum of money (Note: 4000 marks). The treaty expressly preserved the status of the rulers of Suðreyjar; the MacRory lands, excepting Bute, Arran, and Jura, became the Lordship of Garmoran, a quasi-independent crown dependency, rather than an intrinsic part of Scotland.

== Lordship of Garmoran ==
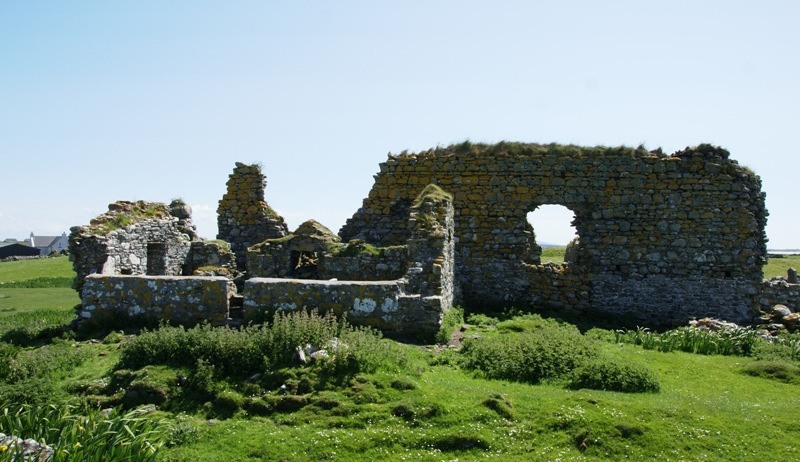
The ruins of Teampull na Trionaid, an Augustinian nunnery and "college of learning" at Carinish said, in the Red Book of Clanranald, to have been founded by Bethóc, daughter of Somerled, and rebuilt and enlarged by Amy of Garmoran, after her divorce from John of Islay, Lord of the Isles.

At the turn of the century, William I had created the position of Sheriff of Inverness, to be responsible for the Scottish highlands, which theoretically now extended to Garmoran. In 1293, however, King John Balliol established the Sheriffdom of Skye, which included the Outer Hebrides. Nevertheless, following his usurpation, the Skye sheriffdom ceased to be mentioned (Note: in surviving records, at least), and the Garmoran lordship (including Uist) was confirmed to the MacRory leader. In 1343, King David II issued a further charter for this to the latter's son.

In 1346, just three years later, the sole surviving MacRory heir was Amy of Garmoran. The southern parts of the Kingdom of the Isles had become the Lordship of the Isles, ruled by the MacDonalds (another group of Somerled's descendants). Amy married the MacDonald leader, John of Islay, but a decade later he divorced her, and married the king's niece instead (in return for a substantial dowry). As part of the divorce, John deprived his eldest son, Ranald, of the ability to inherit the Lordship of the Isles, in favour of a son by his new wife. As compensation, John granted Lordship of the Uists to Ranald's younger brother Godfrey, and made Ranald Lord of the remainder of Garmoran.

However, on Ranald's death, his sons were still children, and Godfrey took the opportunity to seize the Lordship of Garmoran. Furthermore, Godfrey had a younger brother, Murdoch, whose heirs (the Siol Murdoch) now claimed to own part of North Uist. This led to a great deal of violent conflict involving Godfrey's family (the Siol Gorrie) and those of his brothers. Surviving records do not describe this in detail, but traditional accounts report an incident where the Siol Gorrie dug away the embankment of a Loch, causing it to flood a nearby village in which the Siol Murdoch lived (and hence drown them); the accounts claim that the floodwater formed Loch Hosta.

In 1427, frustrated with the level of violence generally in the highlands, together with the insurrection caused by his own cousin, King James I demanded that highland magnates should attend a meeting at Inverness. On arrival, many of the leaders were seized and imprisoned. Alexander MacGorrie, son of Godfrey, was considered to be one of the two most reprehensible, and after a quick show trial, was immediately executed. As Alexander had by now inherited Godfrey's de facto position as Lord of Garmoran, and in view of Ranald's heirs being no less responsible for the violence, King James declared the Lordship forfeit.

== Early lairds ==
=== Hugh of Sleat and his sons ===
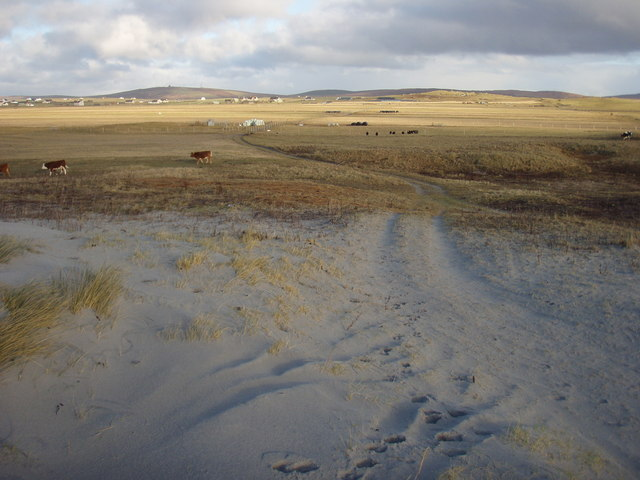
View over western North Uist

Following the forfeiture, most of Garmoran (including North Uist) remained with the Scottish crown until 1469, when James III granted Lairdship of it to John of Ross, the Lord of the Isles. In turn, John passed it to his own half-brother, Hugh of Sleat; the grant to Hugh was confirmed by the king – James IV – in a 1493 charter, but Ranald's heirs (Clan Ranald) disputed the charter.

Hugh died a few years later, and in 1505 his eldest son, John, granted North Uist (and Sleat) to Ranald Bane, the Captain of Clanranald; the reasons John had for this are not reported by surviving records. Nevertheless, Hugh's second son, Donald Gallach, opposed Clan Ranald and established his own de facto control of North Uist and Sleat (Note: Historic records refer to this as holding the lands "by the sword"). In the following year (1506), Donald was stabbed to death by his own younger brother – Black Archibald. The king authorised Ranald Bane to take the lands by force; according to traditional accounts, Ranald Bane's success led to Black Archibald resorting to piracy.

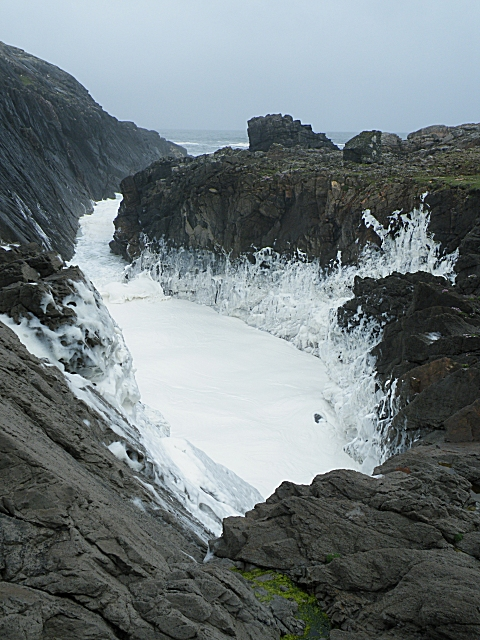
sea foam in North West North Uist

Three years later, however, Black Archibald returned. Traditional accounts relate that while he had been away, Angus Collach (Note: "Collach" refers to the fact that Angus' mother was from Coll) (Archibald's other brother) attempted to rape a woman on North Uist; outraged by this, an armed party made up of men from the Siol Gorrie (to which the woman belonged) and Clan Ranald (to which her husband belonged) captured Angus and drowned him at sea. According to these accounts, Black Archibald now took revenge, killing large numbers of Siol Gorrie. Despite his behaviour, Black Archibald managed to ingratiate himself with James IV, by capturing and handing over two pirates – distant relations from Clan MacAlister; in 1511, the king rewarded Black Archibald by pardoning him for his crimes, and confirming his possession of Sleat and North Uist.

=== The Hunchback ===
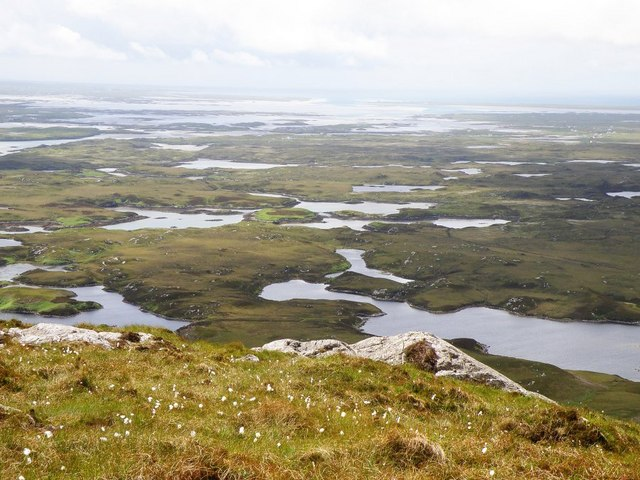
View over northern North Uist

At some point before 1520, Black Archibald was murdered by Donald Gallach's son, Donald Gruamach (Note: Graumach is Gaelic for "gloomy"). Consequently, in 1520, James IV issued a charter awarding lairdship of Sleat and North Uist to Alasdair Crotach MacLeod (Note: Crotach is Gaelic for "hunchback"), the leader of the Sìol Tormoid, who possessed the neighbouring lands, and had been loyal to James during Donald Dubh's rebellion.

In 1539, Donald Gruamach's son – Donald Gorm (Note: Gorm is Gaelic for "bue"; typically, Gorm was used as a nickname for people with blue/green eyes) – invaded the Siol Tormoid lands on Skye, in an attempt to take back Sleat and North Uist (Note: Donald Gorm's ultimate aim was to re-establish the Lordship of the Isles, which by this point had been defunct for over 40 years. Donald Gorm was the senior male heir to the Lordship, except for Donald Dubh, whose legitimacy was thought suspect). However, that same year, Donald Gorm was hit by an arrow while besieging Eilean Donan castle; in the process of removing it, he severed an artery, and died (Note: The arrow was barbed, unbeknownst to him. According to a traditional legend, this single arrow had been the only piece of ammunition present in the entire castle, which was otherwise undefended). In November 1542, king James V issued a charter confirming Alastair Crotach as laird of Sleat and North Uist.

=== Mary MacLeod ===
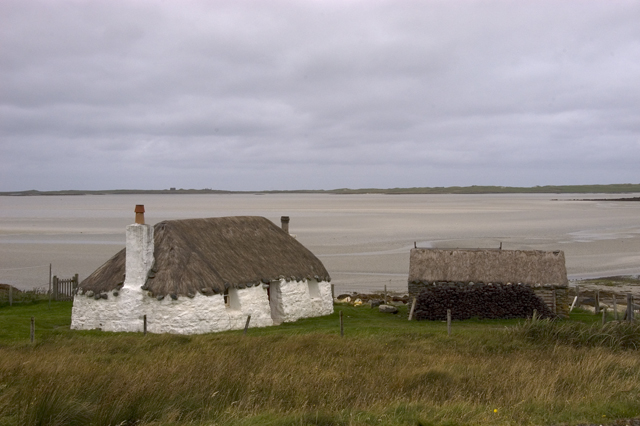
Traditional cottage on Uist

After the deaths of Alastair Crotach and his son William in quick succession (1547, and 1553, respectively), Alastair's heir was his young granddaughter, Mary MacLeod. Donald Gormson, Donald Gorm's son, took the opportunity to seize Sleat and North Uist. The Earl of Arran, regent to Mary, Queen of Scots, assigned nominal feudal wardship of her to the Earl of Huntly, who himself proposed to sell it to the Earl of Argyll. Following Arran's death in 1554, Mary of Guise was appointed regent for her daughter and issued Argyll and Huntly with a "commission of fire and sword" against Donald Gormson and Clan Ranald, instructing the earls to pursue their "utter extermination".

However, the forces of the Earl of Huntly had previously been defeated by Clan Ranald at the Battle of the Shirts, which made them reluctant to enter Clan Ranald territory; the Earl abandoned the pursuit, but was promptly imprisoned by Mary of Guise for doing so. Three years later, the Lords of the Congregation, the Earl of Argyll among them, emerged as an organised resistance to the Queen Regent. By 1562, the Earl of Huntly, now released, was in outright opposition to Queen Mary, and died opposing her at the battle of Corrichie. In 1565 the tables turned when Donald Gormson took the queen's side during the Chaseabout Raid and was consequently back in royal favour.

On 4 March 1567 (Note: 1566 old-style) Donald Gormson and the Earl of Argyll drew up a contract, according to which:

- Donald Gormson would enter a bond of manrent to the Earl of Argyll
- Donald Gormson would provide military aid to Mary MacLeod's uncle, on demand from the Earl of Argyll
- Mary MacLeod would quitclaim her rights to Sleat and North Uist in return for 500 marks, to be paid by Donald Gormson
- The Earl of Argyll would persuade Queen Mary to grant him a charter for those lands, and subinfeudate them to Donald Gormson, in return for 1000 marks

=== Old Blue-eyes ===
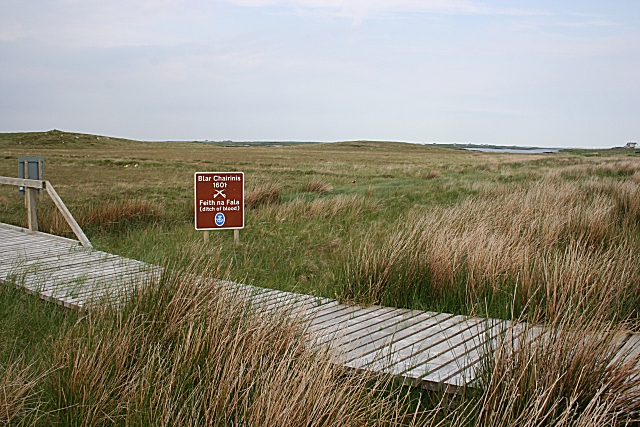
The Battlefield at Carinish (Note: the modern walkway bridges a militarily significant ditch)

In 1594, as an opponent of The Reformation, Donald Gorm Mor (Note: Mor is Gaelic for "the elder") – Donald Gormson's grandson – sent troops to Gaelic Ireland to assist Aodh Mór Ó Néill and Red Hugh O'Donnell during the Rising of the Northern Clans against Queen Elizabeth I of England. In 1596, concerned by this, and similar action by other Scottish clan chiefs, King James VI of Scotland (Elizabeth's heir) demanded that highland leaders send well-armed men, as well as attending themselves, to meet him at Dumbarton on 1 August. Donald Gorm Mor obeyed the summons, and was consequently pardoned for previous offences, and granted a charter which acknowledged him as rightful heir of Hugh of Sleat, and confirmed him as laird of Sleat and North Uist.

In an attempt to solidify peaceful relations with the Siol Tormoid, Donald Gorm Mor married the daughter of the then Siol Tormoid leader, Rory Mor. Unfortunately, the marriage failed catastrophically, leading to the War of the One-Eyed Woman. A series of initial skirmishes led to the Battle of Carinish in North Uist, the last battle in Scotland that involved bows and arrows. It led to the Battle of Coire Na Creiche, where Donald Gorm Mor won a more decisive victory, at which point the privy council intervened, and imposed a lasting peace. Donald was succeeded by his nephew, Donald Gorm Og (Note: Og is Gaelic for "the younger"), whose loyalty to the king resulted in him being made the first Baronet of Sleat (Note: Despite the Baronetcy referring to Sleat, in Scotland, it was created in the peerage of Nova Scotia, rather than of Scotland, as an attempt to encourage colonial development of Nova Scotia).

== Post-union ==
=== The Papists Act ===
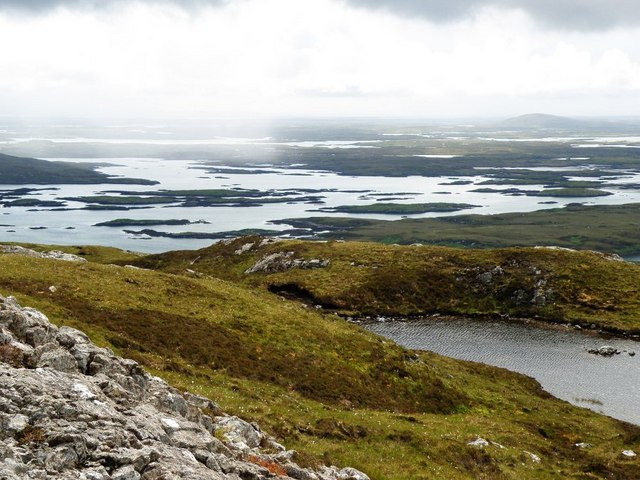
View over southern North Uist

A century later, Sir Donald MacDonald, the 4th Baronet of Sleat, was living comfortably in Glasgow. In 1715, he supported the Jacobite rebellion and attacked the Earl of Sutherland, but fell ill and fled to Skye. He was pursued and forced to flee to North Uist. When the Papists Act was passed the following year, requiring his attendance at Inverlochy, he argued that he was too ill to travel, but magistrates could visit him instead. Under the terms of the act, this made him a recusant, and his lairdships were accordingly forfeited, under the terms of the Forfeited Estates Act of the previous year.

The Commissioners of Forfeited Estates surveyed the land and found that it was in very poor condition; in North Uist, the local population had recently lost 745 cows, 573 horses, and 820 sheep to plague, and the sea had overflowed the land and destroyed many houses. On his succession in 1723, the 7th baronet (Note: The 4th baronet and his sonless son (the 5th baronet) died in quick succession (1718, and 1720, respectively), leaving the baronetcy to the 4th baronet's brother, James. The 6th baronet died in 1723 and was succeeded by his son, Alexander MacDonald.) arranged for a middleman, Kenneth MacKenzie, (Note: Kenneth MacKenzie was an advocate, based in Edinburgh) to buy back Sleat and North Uist from the Commissioners (Note: for £21,000) and pass them on to him. In 1727, the 7th baronet was granted a royal charter formally acknowledging his position as laird of the Sleat and North Uist.

According to historian John Lorne Campbell, Sir Alexander MacDonald of Sleat and his clan took no part in the Jacobite Uprising of 1745, but they were included in the repression of Highland dress and culture that followed the Battle of Culloden. However, North Uist bard Iain Mac Fhearchair (John MacCodrum), the official poet to the chief, wrote the satirical poem "Òran an Aghaidh an Eididh Ghallda" ("A Song Against the Lowland Garb"), which "shows clearly where his own sympathies lay".

MacCodrum also composed poetry criticizing both the Scottish clan chiefs and the Anglo-Scottish landlords of the Highlands and Islands for the often brutal mass evictions of the Scottish Gaels that followed the Battle of Culloden and on mundane topics such as old age and whiskey.

Among MacCodrum's most popular anti-landlord poems mocks Aonghus MacDhòmhnaill, the post-Culloden tacksman of Griminish. It is believed to date from between 1769 and 1773, when overwhelming numbers of Sir Alexander MacDonald's tenants on the isles of North Uist and Skye were reacting to his rackrenting and other harsh treatments by immigrating to the region surrounding the Cape Fear River in North Carolina. The song is known in the oral tradition of North Uist as Òran Fir Ghriminis ("A Song of the Tacksman of Griminish"). The song is equally popular among speakers of Canadian Gaelic in Nova Scotia, where it is known under the differing title, Òran Aimereaga ("The Song of America").

=== Kelp ===
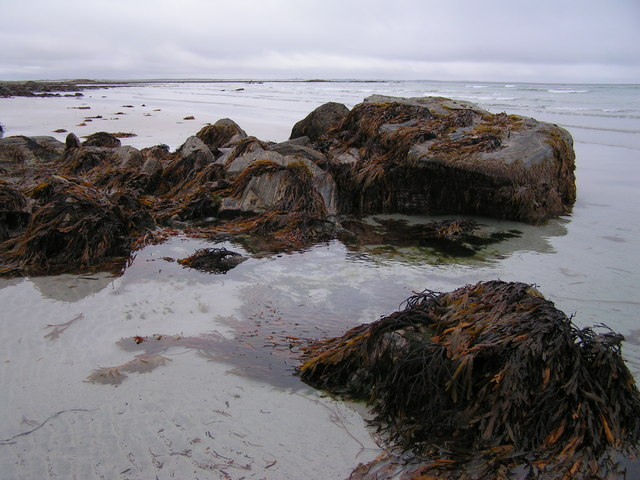
Kelp on the coast of North Uist

During the French Revolutionary Wars, the scarcity of external supplies of minerals to the United Kingdom led to a boom in the kelp industry, which became North Uist's main source of income. When the war ended, the availability of foreign mineral supplies led to an abrupt collapse in the demand for kelp-based products. The burning of kelp had also damaged the fertility of the land. As a result, the crofters of North Uist could no longer afford the rents. Even though the landlords reduced the rents (e.g. in 1827 the rents were reduced by 20%) many crofters resorted to emigration.

In 1826 the villages of Kyles Berneray, Baile Mhic Coinein, and Baile Mhic Phàil, at the north-east corner of North Uist, were abandoned by their inhabitants. Although some moved further south-east to Loch Portain, most of those affected moved to Cape Breton, in Nova Scotia (Note: This is shown in the rental roll of 1827, which states that over fifty families had "Gone to America", meaning Cape Breton.). As the economic conditions worsened, and with reports of islanders having success overseas, the numbers of families emigrating from Scotland to North America greatly increased. By 1838, the number of people having left North Uist was reported as 1,300; before the 1820s, the population of North Uist had been almost 5,000, but by 1841 it had fallen to 3,870.

=== The Highland Clearances ===
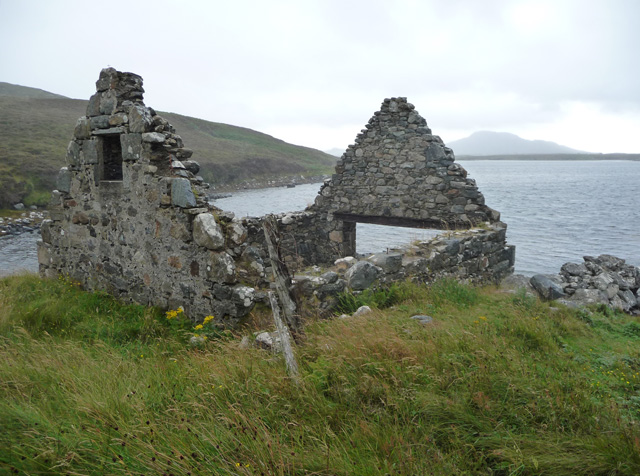
One of many abandoned buildings on Uist

The 7th baronet's heir, Godfrey MacDonald (Note: Godfrey William Wentworth Bosville-Macdonald) (the 4th Baron of Slate (Note: Slate is in County Antrim, in Northern Ireland, not to be confused with Sleat in Scotland)) ran sheep on the abandoned crofts. The land was poor for farming but sufficient to sustain sheep, bringing the baron a better profit. As a result, he orchestrated one of the most notable mass evictions of the Highland Clearances. In 1849, an attempt to evict 603 crofters from Sollas (Note: A Hebridean settlement in Cape Breton County, Nova Scotia was originally called Sollas, in connection with the evictees. It is now called Woodbine) caused rioting. Rocks were reportedly thrown at the police officers sent from Glasgow to quell the riot. In the convictions that followed (Note: for the crime of rioting), the jury added the following written comments:

...the jury unanimously recommend the pannels to the utmost leniency and mercy of the Court, in consideration of the cruel, though it may be legal, proceedings adopted in ejecting the whole people of Solas from their houses and crops without the prospect of shelter, or a footing in their fatherland, or even the means of expatriating them to a foreign one...

In 1855, Sir Godfrey decided to sell North Uist to Sir John Powlett Orde.

According to Bill Lawson, "The MacDonalds of Sleat possessed the island from 1469 until 1855, though the later proprietors took little interest in their estate except as a source of income. In 1855 the Lord MacDonald of the day sold the island to Sir John Powlett Orde, who had gained the reputation of being the worst type of landlord, utterly opposed to any attempt to improve the lot of his tenants, though it is only fair to point out that every one of the major evictions on the island was in fact carried out by the MacDonalds; they, being of a local source, are forgiven, and the blame is reserved for the incoming Sir John. He, in turn, sold parts of the island to his son Sir Arthur Campbell-Orde, mainly in order to frustrate the terms of the Crofter's Acts, which could have allowed crofters to apply for more land, but only on land with the same ownership. Sir Arthur eventually inherited the whole estate; he seems to have been a very different type of landlord, and was involved in the re-crofting of Sollas and other areas."

The pre-clearance population of North Uist was about 5,000. Families particularly depleted during the clearances were the MacAulays, Morrisons, MacCodrums, MacCuishs, and MacDonalds.

== Modern times ==
In 1889, counties were formally created in Scotland, on shrieval boundaries, by a dedicated Local Government Act; North Uist, therefore, became part of the new county of Inverness. Following late 20th century reforms, it became part of the Highland Region.

In 1944, the Campbell-Orde family sold North Uist to Douglas Douglas-Hamilton, 14th Duke of Hamilton, who in 1960 sold it in turn to the 5th Earl Granville, and the current laird is Fergus Leveson-Gower, 6th Earl Granville, who lives on the island. The Granville family administers the island through a trust fund called the North Uist Trust.

Some of the machair townships, however, were taken over by the Board of Agriculture and its successors. In the 21st century the population of North Uist has declined to around 1,200.

== See also ==
• History of the Outer Hebrides
