= Ragnall mac Somairle =

King of the Isles, Lord of Argyll, Lord of Kinytre

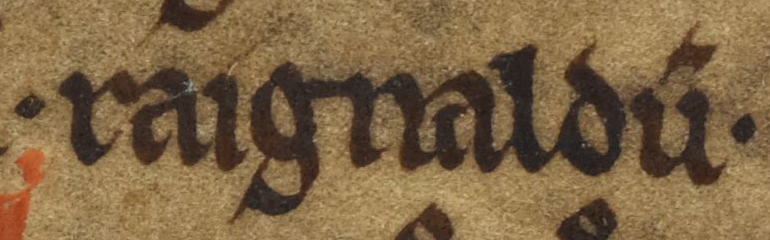
- Ragnall's name as it appears on folio 35v of British Library Cotton MS Julius A VII (the Chronicle of Mann): "Raignaldum"
- Spouse: Fonia
- Issue: Ruaidrí, Domnall
- Dynasty: Clann Somairle
- Father: Somairle mac Gilla Brigte
- Mother: Ragnhildr Óláfsdóttir

Ragnall mac Somairle (also known in Gaelic as Raghnall, Raonall, Raonull; in English as Ranald; in Latin as Reginaldus; and in Old Norse as Rögnvaldr, Røgnvaldr, Rǫgnvaldr; died c. 1191/1192 – 1210/1227) (Note: This mediaeval Gaelic name means "Ragnall son of Somairle". Scholars have rendered Ragnall's name variously in recent secondary sources: Raghnall, Ragnall, Ranald, Raonall, Raonull, Reginald, Reginaldus, Rognvald, Rögnvaldr, Røgnvaldr, and Rǫgnvaldr. Likewise, his father's name is rendered: Somairle, Somerled, Somhairle, Somhairlidh, Sorley, and Sumarliði.) was a significant late-twelfth-century magnate, seated on the western seaboard of Scotland. He was probably a younger son of Somairle mac Gilla Brigte, Lord of Argyll and his wife, Ragnhildr, daughter of Óláfr Guðrøðarson, King of the Isles. The twelfth-century Kingdom of the Isles, ruled by Ragnall's father and maternal grandfather, existed within a hybrid Norse-Gaelic milieu, which bordered an ever-strengthening and consolidating Kingdom of Scots.

In the mid-twelfth century, Somairle rose in power and won the Kingdom of the Isles from his brother-in-law. After Somairle perished in battle against the Scots in 1164, much of his kingdom was probably partitioned between his surviving sons. Ragnall's allotment appears to have been in the southern Hebrides and Kintyre. In time, Ragnall appears to have risen in power and became the leading member of Somairle's descendants, the meic Somairle (or Clann Somairle). Ragnall is known to have styled himself "King of the Isles, Lord of Argyll and Kintyre" and "Lord of the Isles". His claim to the title of king, like other members of the meic Somairle, is derived through Ragnhildr, a member of the Crovan dynasty.

Ragnall disappears from record after he and his sons were defeated by his brother Áengus. Ragnall's death date is unknown, although certain dates between 1191 and 1227 are all possibilities. Surviving contemporary sources reveal that Ragnall was a significant patron of the Church. Although his father appears to have aligned himself with traditional forms of Christianity, Ragnall himself is associated with newer reformed religious orders from the continent. Ragnall's now non-existent seal, which pictured a knight on horseback, also indicates that he attempted to present himself as an up-to-date ruler, not unlike his Anglo-French contemporaries of the bordering Kingdom of Scots.

Ragnall is known to have left two sons, Ruaidrí and Domnall, who went on to found powerful Hebridean families. Either Ragnall or Ruaidrí had daughters who married Ragnall's first cousins Rǫgnvaldr and Óláfr, two thirteenth-century kings of the Crovan dynasty.

== Origins of the meic Somairle ==
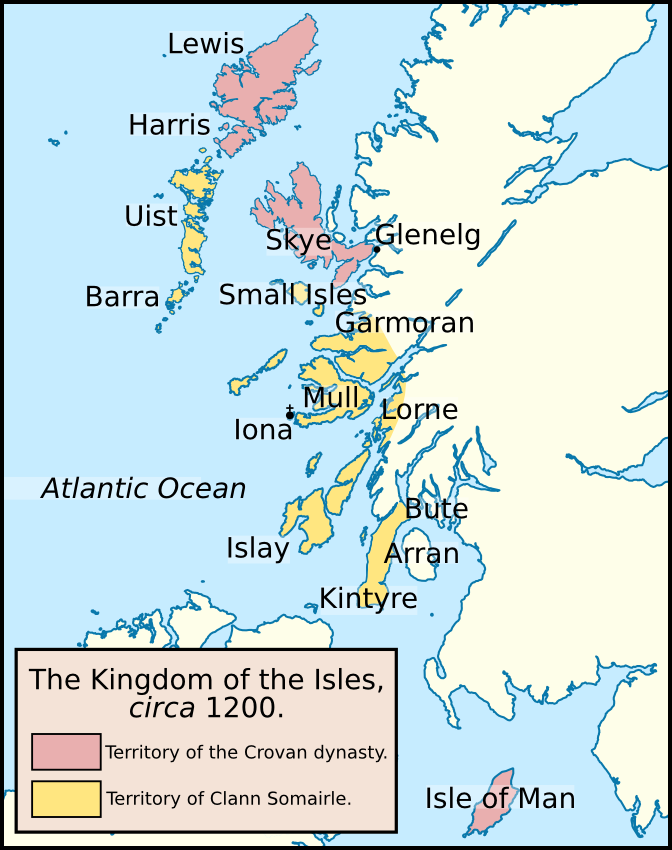
Map of the divided Kingdom of the Isles, c. 1200. The lands of the Crovan dynasty bordering those of the meic Somairle

Ragnall was a son of Somairle mac Gilla Brigte, Lord of Argyll (died 1164) and his wife, Ragnhildr, daughter of Óláfr Guðrøðarson, King of the Isles. Somairle and Ragnhildr had at least three sons: Dubgall (died after 1175), Ragnall, Áengus (died 1210), and probably also a fourth, Amlaíb. Dubgall appears to have been the couple's eldest son. (Note: Another son, Gilla Brigte, who was killed with Somairle in 1164, was probably the product of an earlier marriage. Other than being recorded as a son of Somairle and his wife in the Chronicle of Mann, nothing further is known of Amlaíb.) Little is certain of the origins of Ragnall's father, although his marriage suggests that he belonged to a family of some substance. In the first half of the twelfth century, the Hebrides and the Isle of Man (Mann) were encompassed within the Kingdom of the Isles, which was ruled by Somairle's father-in-law, a member of the Crovan dynasty. Somairle's rise to power may well have begun at about this time, as the few surviving sources from the era suggest that Argyll may have begun to slip from the control of King David I of Scotland (died 1153).

Somairle first appears on record in 1153, when he rose in rebellion with his nephews, the sons of the royal pretender Máel Coluim mac Alaxandair (fl. 1134), against the recently enthroned Máel Coluim IV, King of Scots (died 1165). (Note: There has been much confusion over the identity of father of Somairle's nephews, and some modern scholars have regarded him as a member of the meic Áeda kindred. Recently, however, Máel Coluim has been identified as an illegitimate son of Alexander I, King of Scots (died 1124). In the early twelfth century, this Máel Coluim is recorded in open rebellion against his uncle King David I of Scotland (died 1153). At some point prior to his capture and imprisonment by the Scots, Máel Coluim appears to have conducted a marriage alliance with Somairle's father.) In the same year, Somairle's father-in-law was murdered after ruling the Kingdom of the Isles about forty years. Óláfr was succeeded by his son, Guðrøðr; and sometime afterwards, Somairle participated in a coup within the kingdom by presenting Dubgall as a potential king. In consequence, Somairle and his brother-in-law fought a naval battle in 1156, after which much of the Hebrides appear to have fallen under Somairle's control. Two years later, he defeated Guðrøðar outright and took control of the entire island-kingdom. In 1164, Somairle again rose against the King of Scots, and is recorded in various early sources to have commanded a massive invasion force of men from throughout the Isles, Argyll, Kintyre and Scandinavian Dublin. Somairle's host sailed up the Clyde, and made landfall near what is today Renfrew, where they were crushed by the Scots, and he himself was slain. Following Somairle's demise, Guðrøðr returned to the Isles and seated himself on Mann, although the Hebridean-territories won by Somairle in 1156 were retained by his descendants, the meic Somairle.

Although contemporary sources are silent on the matter, it is more than likely that on Somairle's demise, his territory was divided amongst his surviving sons. The precise allotment of lands is unknown; even though the division of lands amongst later generations of meic Somairle can be readily discerned, such boundaries are unlikely to have existed during the chaotic twelfth century. It is possible that the territory of the first generation of meic Somairle may have stretched from Glenelg in the north, to the Mull of Kintyre in the south; with Áengus ruling in the north, Dubgall centred in Lorne (with possibly the bulk of the inheritance), and Ragnall in Kintyre and the southern islands.

== Internal conflict ==
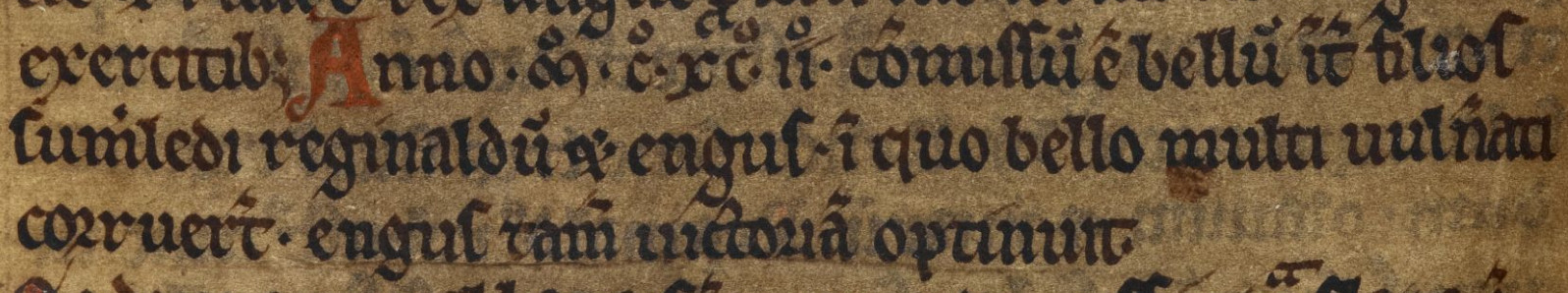
Excerpt from folio 40v of British Library Cotton MS Julius A VII (the Chronicle of Mann) documenting Ragnall's defeat at the hands of Áengus in 1192

Little is known of Somairle's descendants in the decades following his demise. Dubgall does not appear on record until 1175, when he is attested far from the Isles in Durham, by the Durham Cathedral's Liber Vitae. Nothing is certain of Dubgall's later activities, and it is possible that, by the 1180s, Ragnall had begun to encroach upon Dubgall's territories and his position as head of the meic Somairle. The fact that Dubgall is not accorded any title by the Liber Vitae could be evidence that Ragnall had displaced him upon Somairle's demise, or that the chronicle's account of Dubgall's connection with the kingship is merely the work of thirteenth-century bias favouring the powerful meic Dubgaill, Dubgaill's descendants.

In 1192, the Chronicle of Mann records that Ragnall and his sons were defeated in a particularly bloody battle against Áengus. The chronicle does not identify the location of the battle, or elaborate under what circumstances it was fought. However, it is possible that the conflict took place in the northern part of the meic Somairle domain, where some of Áengus' lands may have lain. Although the hostile contact between Ragnall and Áengus could have been result of Ragnall's rise in power at Dubgall's expense, the clash of 1192 may also mark Ragnall's downfall.

Nineteenth-century depiction of the seal of Alan fitz Walter, Steward of Scotland

One of several ecclesiastical sources that deal specifically with Ragnall is an undated grant to the Cluniac priory at Paisley. (Note: At a later date this priory was elevated to the status of an abbey.) Since this grant probably dates to the period after Ragnall's defeat to Áengus, it may be evidence of an attempt made by Ragnall to secure an alliance with Alan fitz Walter, Steward of Scotland (died 1204). The patrons of this priory were members of Alan's own family, a powerful kindred that had recently begun to expand its influence westwards from Renfrew, to the frontier of the Scottish realm and the fringes of Argyll. (Note: Only about thirty years previous, Ragnall's father had perished whilst launching an attack on Renfrew, the heart of the lordship of Alan's father.) Since Bute seems to have fallen into the hands of this kindred at about the time of Ragnall's grant, it is possible that Alan took advantage of the internal conflict between the meic Somairle, and seized the island before 1200. Alternately, Alan may have received the island from Ragnall as payment for military support against Áengus, who appears to have gained the upper hand over Ragnall by 1192. Alan's expansion and influence in territories outwith the bounds of the Scottish kingdom may have been perceived as a threat by King William the Lion (died 1214), and may partly explain the king's construction of a royal castle at Ayr in 1195. This fortress extended Scottish royal authority into the outer Firth of Clyde region, and was probably intended to dominate not only William's peripheral barons, but also independent rulers just beyond the borders of the Scottish realm. (Note: There is evidence that the Steward's acquisition of Bute was met with continuing local opposition. In 1230 and 1263, the island was singled out and seized by Norwegian-backed fleets intent on reasserting Norse control in the Isles. In the latter campaign, the Norse forces included a certain Ruaidrí who claimed the island by hereditary right. About at least a decade earlier, one particular charter of Ragnall's grandson, Áengus mac Domnaill, Lord of Islay (died c. 1293), was witnessed by a certain Ferchar of Bute ("Ferchardo de Buit") and his brother Donnchad; another charter was witnessed by a certain Ferchar, son of Niall of Bute ("Ferchar filio Nigilli de Buyt").) In fact, Alan's westward expansion appears to have suddenly ceased at about 1200, and may have been a consequence of royal anxiety concerning an alliance with Ragnall.

== Titles and seal ==
front

reverse

This late-nineteenth-century interpretation of Ragnall's now non-existent seal is an unauthentic depiction of how the original would have looked.

A royal inspection of Saddell Abbey, dated to 1508, reveals that Ragnall styled himself in a Latin charter to the abbey rex insularum, dominus de Ergile et Kyntyre ("King of the Isles, Lord of Argyll and Kintyre"), a title which may indicate that Ragnall claimed all the possessions of his father. In what is probably a later charter, Ragnall is styled in Latin dominus de Inchegal ("Lord of the Isles") in his grant to the priory of Paisley. Although Ragnall's abandonment of the title "king" in favour of "lord" may not be significant, it could be connected with his defeat to Áengus, or to the expansion and rise in power of Ragnall's namesake and first cousin Rǫgnvaldr Guðrøðarson, King of the Isles (died 1229). The style dominus de Inchegal is not unlike dominus Insularum ("Lord of the Isles"), a title first adopted in 1336 by Ragnall's great-great-grandson, Eoin Mac Domhnaill, Lord of the Isles (died c. 1387), the first of four successive Lords of the Isles.

Ragnall's grant to the priory of Paisley is preserved in two documents: one dates to the late twelfth or early thirteenth century, and a later copy is contained in an instrument which dates to 1426. Appended to the latter document is a description of a seal impressed in white wax, which the fifteenth-century notary alleged to have belonged to Ragnall. On one side, the seal is described to have depicted a ship, filled with men-at-arms. On the reverse side, the seal was said to have depicted a man on horseback, armed with a sword in his hand.

Ragnall is the only member of the meic Somairle known to have styled himself in documents rex insularum. (Note: Although, the Chronicle of Mann records that Eógan mac Donnchada, King in the Isles (died in or after 1268), styled himself as such in 1250, during his failed invasion of Mann with Magnús Óláfsson (died 1265). Eógan was a grandson of Ragnall's brother Dubgall. Magnús was a nephew of Rǫgnvaldr, a member of the Crovan dynasty, and a later King of Mann and the Isles.) His use of both the title and seal are probably derived from those of the leading members of the Crovan dynasty, such as his namesake Rǫgnvaldr, who not only bore the same title but was said to have borne a similar two-sided seal. The descriptions of the cousins' seals shows that these devices combined the imagery of a Norse-Gaelic galley and an Anglo-French knight. The maritime imagery probably symbolised the power of a ruler of an island-kingdom, and the equestrian imagery appears to have symbolised feudal society, in which the cult of knighthood had reached its peak in the twelfth and early thirteenth centuries. The use of such seals by leading Norse-Gaelic lords, seated on the periphery of the kingdoms of Scotland and England, probably illustrates their desire to present themselves as up-to-date and modern to their contemporaries in Anglo-French society.

== Norse-Gaelic namesake ==
Descendants of Óláfr Guðrøðarson

Simplified family tree concerning the descendants of Óláfr Guðrøðarson, specifically his grandsons Ragnall and Rǫgnvaldr. The latter was almost certainly a paternal grandson of Affraic ingen Fergusa, and there is reason to suspect that Ragnall was a maternal grandson of Ingibjǫrg Hakonsdóttir.

Ingibjǫrg	Óláfr	Affraic
Ragnhildr	Guðrøðr
Ragnall	Rǫgnvaldr

The Gaelic Ragnall corresponds to the Old Norse Rǫgnvaldr. Both names were Latinised to Reginaldus. The fact that two closely related Hebridean rulers, Ragnall and Rǫgnvaldr, shared the same personal names, the same grandfather, and (at times) the same title, has perplexed modern historians and possibly mediaeval chroniclers as well.

=== Conquest in Caithness ===
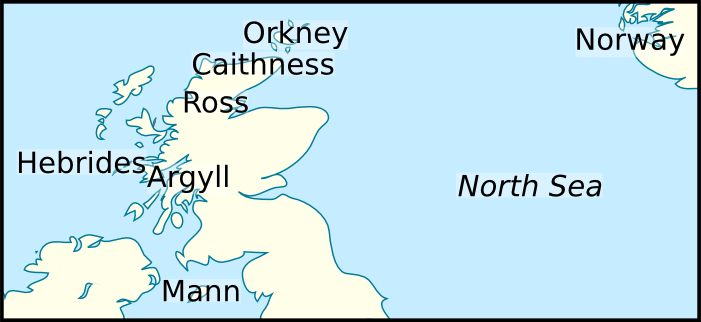
Locations of Ross, Caithness, Orkney and Norway in comparison to Argyll and the Isles (the Hebrides and Mann)

A particular thorn in the side of the Scottish Crown at the turn of the thirteenth century was Haraldr Maddaðarson, Earl of Orkney and Caithness (died 1206). At some point in the last half of the twelfth century, Haraldr put aside his first wife, a daughter of an Earl of Fife, and married Hvarflǫð, a daughter of an Earl of Ross. The latter woman was a member of the powerful meic Áedha, a northern kindred who had been in open conflict with the Scottish Crown throughout the twelfth century. Previous Orcadian earls had extended influence into Ross, and it may well have been through Hvarflǫð, and the claims to the earldom that she passed to their children, that drew Haraldr into conflict with the Scots.

Howden's account of events reveals that Haraldr and his family gained control of Moray early in 1196, and charter evidence suggests that William and royal forces were in the north that summer. Although the Chronicle of Melrose appears to indicate that Hvarflǫð and Haraldr's eldest son was defeated in 1197, it is possible that this event dates to 1196 instead and relates to William's aforesaid northern campaign. Fordun's account records that William successfully asserted royal power in the northern regions; and Howden's account species that the king stripped Haraldr of his lordship in Caithness, and handed it over to Haraldr Eiríksson, a claimant to the Orcadian earldom. At some point after this, Howden's account reveals that Haraldr overcame and killed Haraldr Eiríksson, and the Icelandic Annals specifically date the latter's fall to 1198.

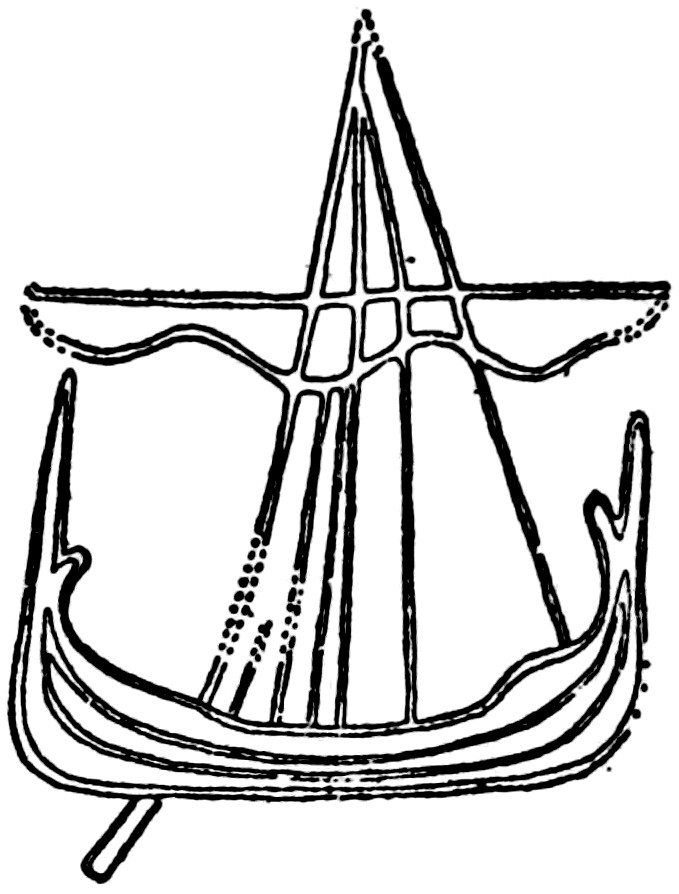
Inscription of a galley depicted on Hedin Cross, a Manx runestone. The power of the kings of the Isles laid in their armed galley-fleets. (Note: The inscription dates to about the time of the Crovan dynasty, possibly from about the eleventh to the thirteenth centuries.)

It may have been at this point where Rǫgnvaldr entered into the fray. Orkneyinga saga states that, once William learned that Haraldr had taken control of Caithness, Rǫgnvaldr was tasked by the king to intervene on the Scots' behalf. Having received the king's message, the saga records that Rǫgnvaldr duly gathered an armed host from the Isles, Kintyre, and Ireland, and went forth into Caithness and subdued the region. Howden's account appears to confirm Rǫgnvaldr's participation in the region, albeit under slightly different circumstances, as it states that Haraldr approached the king and attempted to purchase the earldom. William, however, refused the offer, after which Howden's version of events relates that "Reginaldus", the son of a Manx king, succeeded in purchasing the earldom.

Although Rǫgnvaldr was likely the sea-king who assisted the Scots against Haraldr, there is evidence suggesting that it may have been Ragnall instead. For example, the saga makes the erroneous statement that Rǫgnvaldr was descended from Ingibjǫrg Hakonsdóttir, (Note: The 1873 edition of the saga by J Anderson, JA Hjaltalín, and G Goudie reads that Rǫgnvaldr's father was the son of Ingibjǫrg. So too does the 1887 edition of the saga by G Vigfússon, as does AO Anderson's 1922 extract from Flateyjarbók. According to RA McDonald in 2007, who cited the 1965 edition by F Guðmundsson, the saga instead states that Rǫgnvaldr was the son of Ingibjǫrg. Contrarily, according to G Williams in 2007, who cited and quoted F Guðmundsson's 1965 version, the saga states that she was the mother of Rǫgnvaldr's father. The 1978 edition by H. Pálsson and P.G. Edwards, however, reads that Rǫgnvaldr was the son of Ingibjǫrg.) a woman who was much more likely to have been Ragnall's grandmother than Rǫgnvaldr's. The saga also notes that Rǫgnvaldr's military force was partly gathered from Kintyre, which may be more likely of Ragnall than Rǫgnvaldr, since Ragnall is known to have specifically styled himself dominus Ergile et Kyntyre. Also, transcriptions and translations of Howden's account of the episode have generally stated that "Reginaldus" was a son of Somairle. (Note: For example, Riley (1853) "Reginald, son of Sumerled, king of Man"; Oliver (1860) "Reginald, son of Sumerled, king of Man" and "Reginaldus filius Sumerled rex de Man"; and Stubbs (1871) "Reginaldus, filius Sumerled, rex de Man".) A recent reanalysis of the main extant version of Howden's chronicle has shown, however, that this particular part of the text originally read in Latin Reginaldus filius rex de Man, and was later altered to include Somairle's name above the last three words. Since the source of the original manuscript probably read in Latin Reginaldus filius Godredi, the sea-king in question appears to have been Rǫgnvaldr rather than Ragnall.

Whether Ragnall or Rǫgnvaldr, William's act of using a grandson of Óláfr in Caithness may have been an example of the king playing one member of the jarlsaetten against another. The jarlsaetten were people who possessed a claim to an earldom, in accordance with Norse custom, by right of their descent from previous earls. There are earlier instances of such claimants requesting Scottish kings for what they considered their birthright, and William certainly did this when he granted Caithness to Haraldr Eiríksson, a grandson of Rǫgnvaldr Kali Kolsson, Earl of Orkney. If Ragnall was indeed a descendant of Ingibjǫrg, a daughter of Haakon Paulsson, Earl of Orkney, he was directly descended from previous Scandinavian earls. Whereas Óláfr's marriage to Ingibjǫrg may have meant that Rǫgnvaldr was regarded as a member of the jarlsaetten as well, and a cousin to Haraldr himself.

=== Scandinavian sojourn ===
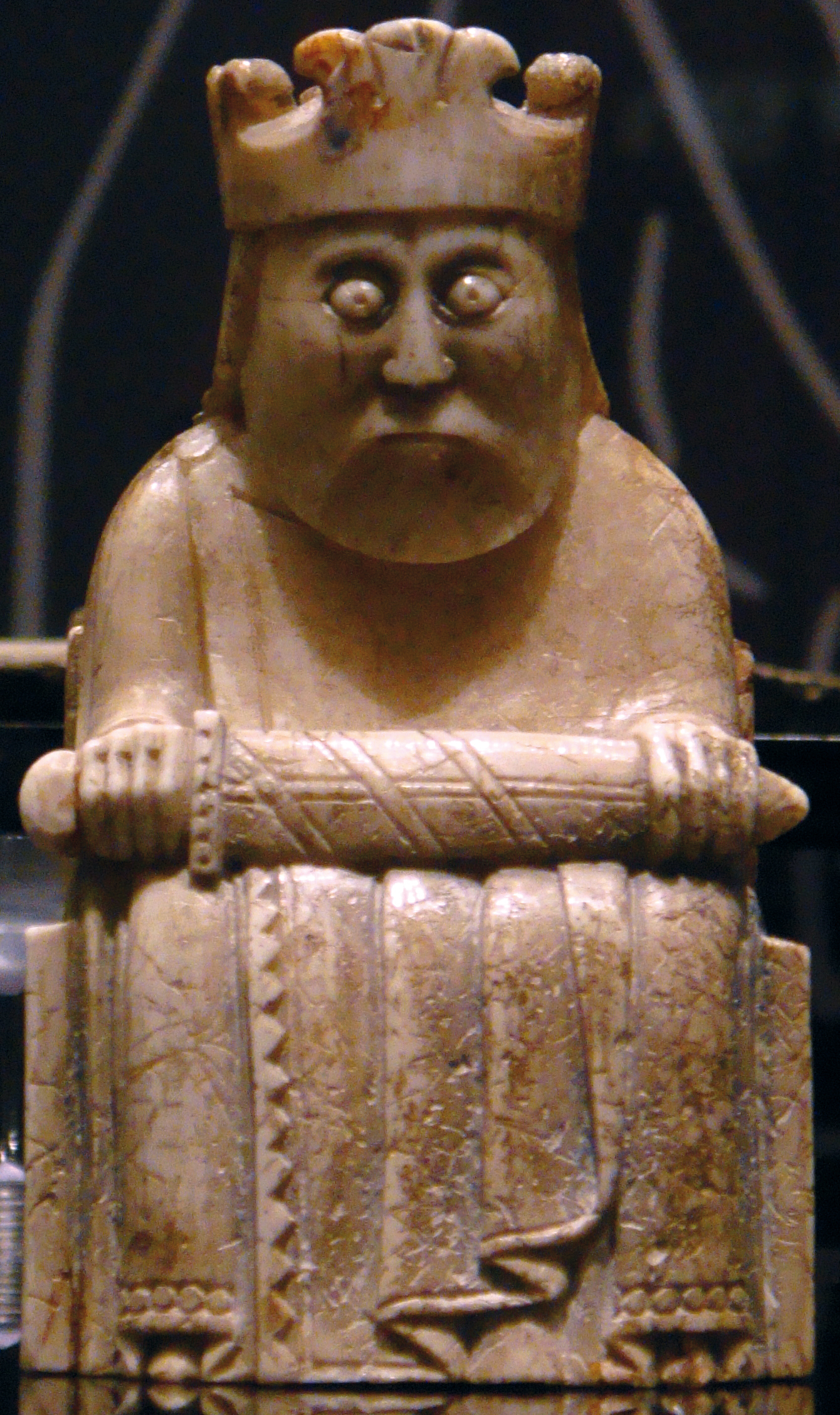
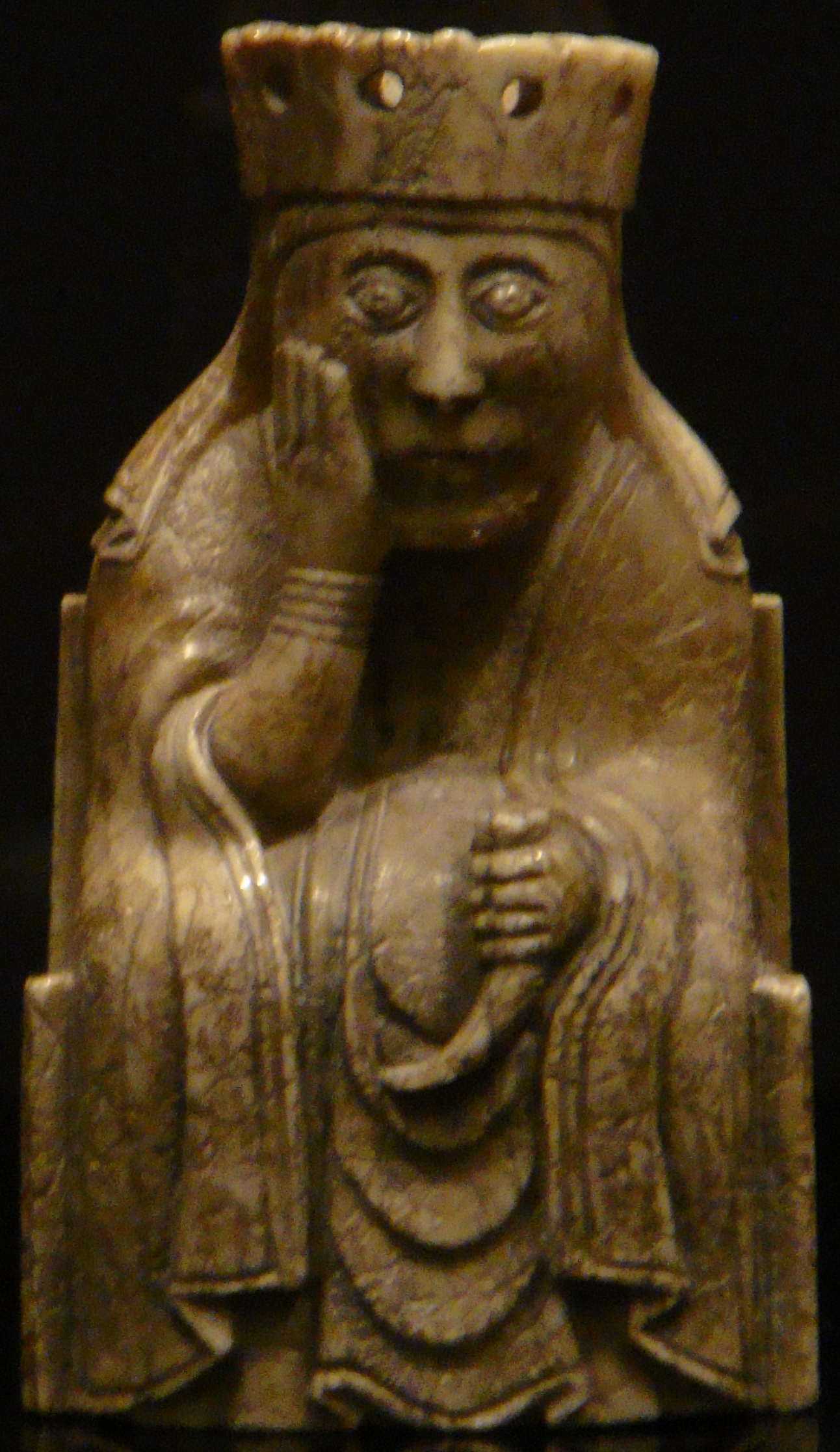
King and queen gaming pieces of the so-called Lewis chessmen. Comprising some four sets, the chessmen are thought to have been crafted in Norway sometime in the twelfth and thirteenth centuries, and were uncovered in Hebrides in the early nineteenth century.

There is another instance where an historical source mentions a man who could refer to either Ragnall or Rǫgnvaldr. The early thirteenth-century Bǫglunga sǫgur indicates at one point that men of two Norwegian factions decided to launch a raiding expedition into the Isles. One particular version of the sagas states that Rǫgnvaldr (styled "King of Mann and the Isles") and Guðrøðr (styled "King on Mann") had not paid their taxes due to the Norwegian kings. In consequence, the saga records that the Isles were ravaged until the two travelled to Norway and reconciled themselves with Ingi Bárðarson, King of Norway (died 1217), whereupon the two took their lands from Ingi as a lén or fief. (Note: The Old Norse term lén is generally translated as a "fief", although the system was not exactly the same or nearly as rigid. Regardless of what the Norwegian kings thought of their relationship with the kings of the Crovan dynasty, the latter likely regarded their kingship as a hereditary right.)

The aforesaid kings of Bǫglunga sǫgur most likely refer to Rǫgnvaldr and his son, Guðrøðr (died 1231), although it is not impossible that the king 'Rǫgnvaldr' in this source may instead refer to Ragnall, and that the king 'Guðrøðr' in it may actually refer to Rǫgnvaldr himself, since the latter's father was named Guðrøðr. Whatever the case, the events depicted in Bǫglunga sǫgur appear to show that, in the wake of destructive Norwegian activity in the Isles, which may have been some sort of officially sanctioned punishment from Scandinavia, Rǫgnvaldr and his son (or instead perhaps Ragnall and Rǫgnvaldr) travelled to Norway where they rendered homage to the Norwegian king, and made compensation for unpaid taxes.

=== Muchdanach and Murcardus ===
According to Hebridean tradition preserved by the seventeenth-century Sleat History, at one point during Ragnall's tenure his followers fought and slew a certain "Muchdanach", ruler of Moidart and Ardnamurchan, and thereby acquired the latter's lands. Muchdanach may be identical to a certain "Murcardus", a man described by the Chronicle of Mann as one whose "power and energy" were felt throughout the Kingdom of the Isles, and whose slaying is recorded in 1188, the year of Rǫgnvaldr's assumption of the kingship. The chronicle's brief account of Murcardus appears to reveal that he was a member of the kingdom's elite, but whether his killing was connected to Rǫgnvaldr's accession is unknown. If Muchdanach and Murcardus were indeed the same individual, the Sleat History would appear to preserve the memory of meic Somairle intrusion into Garmoran, and the episode itself may be an example of feuding between the meic Somairle and Crovan dynasty.

== Ecclesiastical activities ==
=== The Diocese of Argyll ===
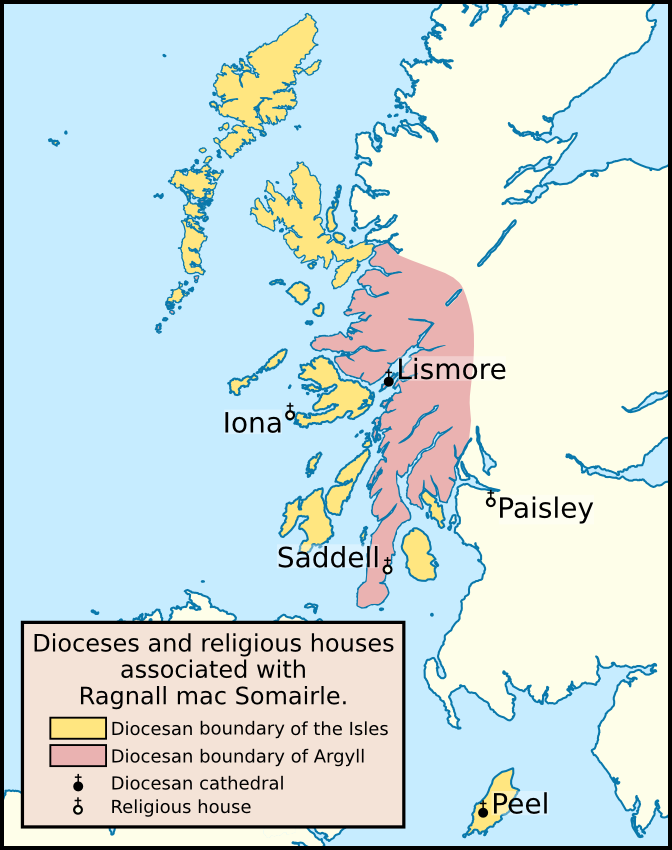
The extent of the Scottish Diocese of Argyll and the Norwegian Diocese of the Isles, and the location of several religious houses noted in the article

The ecclesiastical jurisdiction within the kingdom of Somairle's predecessors was the far-flung Diocese of the Isles. Little is known of its early history, although its origins may well lie with the Uí Ímair imperium. In the mid twelfth century, during the reign of Ragnall's maternal uncle Guðrøðr Óláfsson, King of the Isles (died 1187), the diocese came to be incorporated into the newly established Norwegian Archdiocese of Nidaros. In effect, the political reality of the Diocese of the Isles—its territorial borders and nominal subjection to Norway—appears to have mirrored that of the Kingdom of the Isles. Before the close of the twelfth century, however, evidence of a new ecclesiastical jurisdiction—the Diocese of Argyll—begins to emerge during ongoing contentions between the meic Somairle and the Crovan dynasty.

In the early 1190s, the Chronicle of Mann reveals that Cristinus, Bishop of the Isles, an Argyllman who was probably a meic Somairle candidate, was deposed and replaced by Michael (died 1203), a Manxman who appears to have been backed by Rǫgnvaldr. Cristinus' tenure appears to have spanned at least two decades, during a sustained period of meic Somairle power in the Isles. His downfall, however, came about at about time of the Crovan dynasty's resurgence under Rǫgnvaldr. The latter succeeded his father only years before, in 1187, and appears to have capitalised upon the infighting amongst the meic Somairle, and possibly even the downfall of Ragnall himself. Although the first-known Bishop of Argyll, Haraldr, is accorded a tenure during the first quarter of the thirteenth century, it is likely that there were earlier bishops unknown to surviving sources. In fact, the diocese first appears on record in Liber Censuum, a Papal document dating to the last decade of the twelfth century; and it is possible that Cristinus, or an unknown successor, or perhaps even Haraldr himself, was the first diocesan bishop. Whatever the case, Cristinus' tenure in the Isles may have witnessed an ecclesiastical reorientation, or shift of sorts, towards Argyll.

Although the early diocesan succession of Argyll is uncertain, the jurisdiction itself appears to have lain outwith the domain of Rǫgnvaldr's direct control, allowing the meic Somairle to readily act as religious patrons without his interference. Like the Kingdom of the Isles itself, the great geographic size of the Diocese of the Isles appears to have contributed to the alienation of outlying areas, and to its eventual disintegration. In fact, there is reason to suspect that portions of the new diocese were likewise detached from the Scottish dioceses of Dunblane, Dunkeld, and Moray. Although the Scottish Crown may have welcomed the formation of the new diocese, as it may have formed part of a plan to project Scottish royal authority into the region, the meic Somairle rulers of the region were in fact hostile to the Scots, and the diocese's seat on Lismore—albeit first recorded in the early fourteenth century—lay far outwith the Scottish king's sphere of influence. (Note: According to tradition, the original church on Lismore was founded by the Irish missionary Mo Luóc (died 592). There is reason to suspect that the meic Somairle fostered the cult of this saint to promote the early diocese. First recorded in the early fourteenth century, the cathedral on Lismore appears to have been first constructed by the meic Dubgaill lords of Argyll.) Whatever the case, the foundation of the Diocese of Argyll appears to have been a drawn-out and gradual process that was unlikely to have been the work of one particular man—such as Somerled, Dubgall, or Ragnall himself. Although the early diocese suffered from prolonged vacancies, as only two bishops are recorded to have occupied the see before the turn of the mid thirteenth century, over time it became firmly established in the region, allowing the meic Somairle to retain local control of ecclesiastical power and prestige.

=== Iona Abbey, Iona Nunnery, and St Oran's Chapel ===
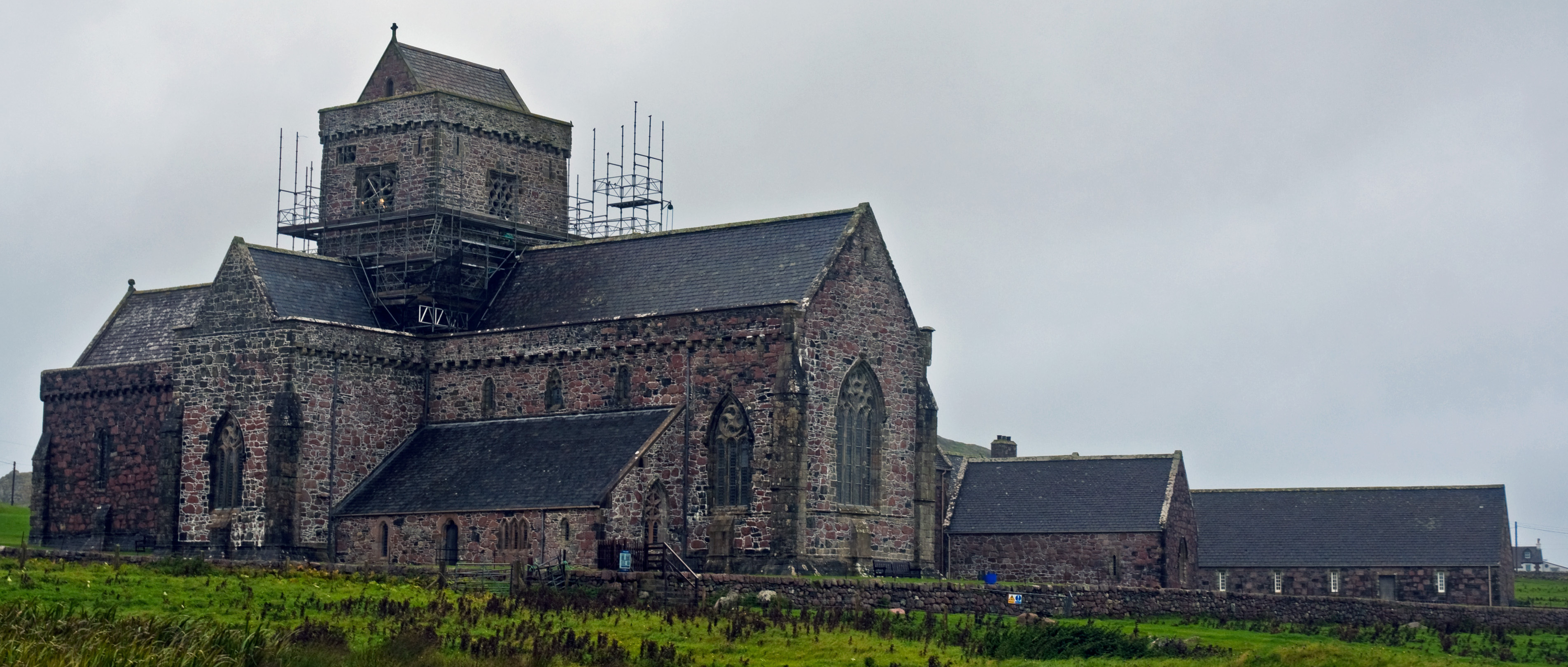
Iona Abbey was probably founded by Ragnall and the meic Somairle in the thirteenth century. Little of the present site dates to the thirteenth century. (Note: The site was greatly restored in the twentieth century. The majority of the 'old' church dates to the fifteenth century. Only the church's choir and the north transept date to the thirteenth century.)

In the sixth century, exiled-Irishman Colum Cille (died 597) seated himself on Iona, from where he oversaw the foundation of numerous daughter-houses in the surrounding islands and mainland. Men of his own choosing, many from his own extended family, were appointed to administrate these dependent houses. In time, a lasting monastic network—an ecclesiastical familia—was centred on the island, and led by his successors. During the ongoing Viking onslaught in the ninth century, the leadership of the familia relocated to Kells. In the twelfth century, Flaithbertach Ua Brolcháin, Abbot of Derry (died 1175), the comarba ("successor") of Colum Cille, relocated from Kells to Derry. (Note: As head of the familia, Flaithbertach was styled in Gaelic comarba Coluim Chille.) In 1164, at a time when Somairle ruled the entire Kingdom of the Isles, the Annals of Ulster indicates that he attempted to reinstate the monastic familia on Iona under Flaithbertach's leadership. Unfortunately for Somairle, the proposal was met with significant opposition, and with his death in the same year, his intentions of controlling the kingdom, diocese, as well as the leadership of the familia came to nothing.

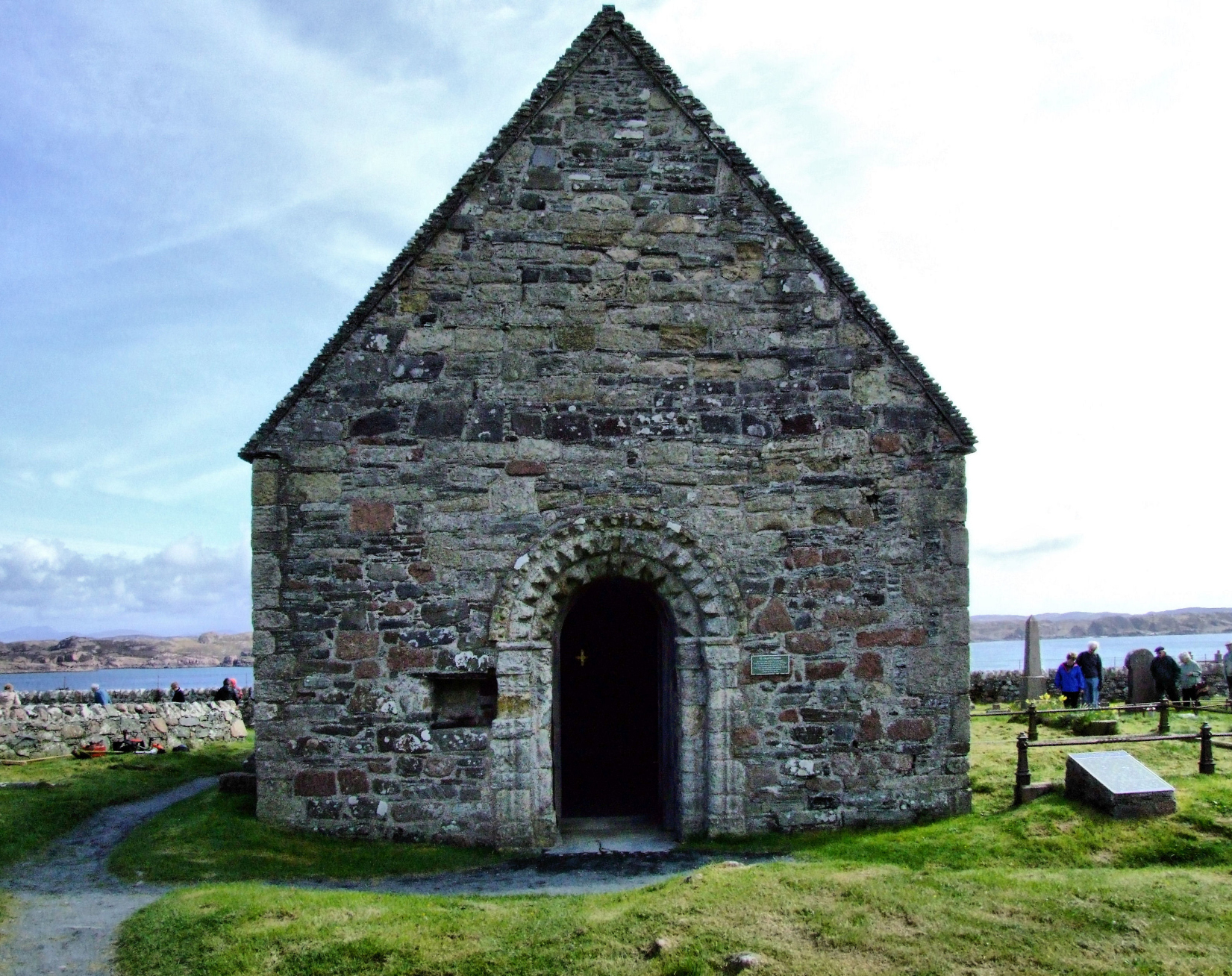
St Oran's Chapel, the oldest intact building on Iona, may have been built by Ragnall, his father, or members of the Crovan dynasty.

About forty years after Somairle's death, a Benedictine monastery was established on Iona. The monastery's foundation charter dates to December 1203, which suggests that Ragnall may have been responsible for its erection, as claimed by early modern tradition preserved in the eighteenth-century Book of Clanranald. Be that as it may, there is no hard evidence linking Ragnall to the house's foundation. Since the charter reveals that the monastery received substantial endowments from throughout the meic Somairle domain, the foundation appears to have been supported by other leading members the kindred, such as Dubgall himself (if he was still alive) or his son, Donnchad. The charter placed the monastery under the protection of Pope Innocent III (died 1216), which secured its episcopal independence from the Diocese of the Isles. However, the price for the privilege of Iona's papal protection appears to have been the adoption of the Benedictine Rule, and the supersession of the centuries-old institution of Colum Cille.

The decision of the meic Somairle to establish the Benedictines on Iona completely contrasted the ecclesiastical actions of Somairle himself, and provoked a prompt and violent response from Colum Cille's familia. According to the Annals of Ulster, after Cellach, Abbot of Iona built the new monastery in 1204, a large force of Irishmen, led by the Bishops of Tyrone and Tirconell and the Abbots of Derry and Inishowen, made landfall on Iona and burnt the new buildings to the ground. The sentiments of the familia may well be preserved in a contemporary poem which portrays Colum Cille lamenting the violation of his rights, and cursing the meic Somairle. (Note: Part of the poem has Colum Cille cursing Somairle's descendants: "I will flatten Clann Somhairlidh, both beasts and men, because they'll go from my counsel, I will lay them down in weakness". Ragnall may well have thought differently of his relationship with Colum Cille, since he invoked the wrath of the saint in his grant to the priory of Paisley, cursing anyone who harmed the monks or monastery: "with the certain knowledge that, by St Columba, whosoever of my heirs molests them shall have my malediction, for if peradventure any evil should be done to them or theirs by my people, or by any others whom it is in my power to bring to account, they shall suffer the punishment of death".) Unfortunately for the familia, the Benedictine presence on Iona was there to stay, and the old monastery of Colum Cille was nearly obliterated by the new monastery. (Note: Hostilities between the meic Somairle and the familia may have continued for decades, as the Annals of Ulster records that Ragnall's (unnamed) sons raided Derry and Inishowen in 1212.) Somairle's attempt to revive Iona brought him into conflict with secular and ecclesiastical power in northern Ireland. If Ragnall was indeed responsible for the foundation of the Benedictine monastery about four decades afterwards, it may indicate that he was following in his father's footsteps, and asserting himself as a king in the Isles.

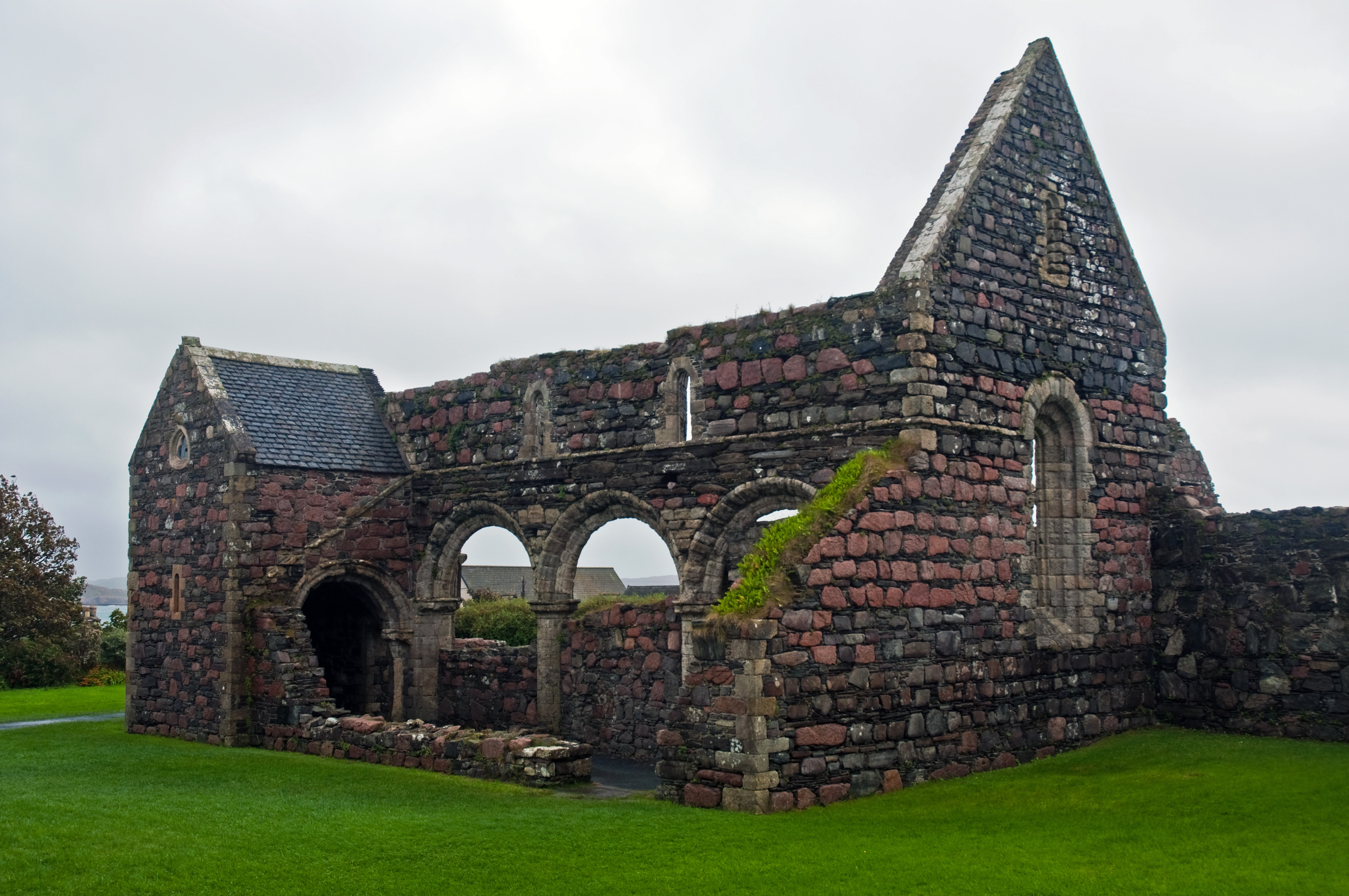
Ruinous Iona Nunnery, probably founded by Ragnall in the early thirteenth century, is one of the best preserved mediaeval nunneries in the British Isles. The church's design has been mostly unaltered since its construction in the early thirteenth century, and gives an approximate impression of how the thirteenth-century abbey church would have looked.

Sometime before the end of the twelfth century, or else early in the thirteenth century after the foundation of the Benedictine monastery, an Augustinian nunnery was established just south of the site. The Book of Clanranald reveals that Ragnall was traditionally regarded as its founder, and states his sister, Bethóc, was remembered as a prioress there. Although this source's claim that the nunnery was originally a Benedictine foundation is erroneous, its statement that Bethóc was a "religious woman" is corroborated by the seventeenth-century record of an inscribed stone on the island, said to have read in Gaelic "Behag nijn Sorle vic Ilvrid priorissa". (Note: In the early nineteenth century, the inscription was recorded to have read "Behag Niin Shorle vic Ilvrid Priorissa", a reading corroborating the earlier record.) Ragnall, therefore, may well have founded the nunnery, and his sister could well have been its first prioress. Like the abbey itself, the remains of the nunnery reveal Irish influences, indicating that the Augustinian nunnery likely had Irish affiliations. In fact, apparent similarities between the layout of the abbey and that of the original church of the cathedral priory at Downpatrick suggests that the Benedictine foundation on Iona was related to the earlier introduction of the same order at Downpatrick by John de Courcy (died 1219?). The latter was an English adventurer who had conquered Ulster about twenty years previous, and had married Affrica (died in or after 1219), Rǫgnvaldr's sister. The possible ecclesiastical connections between the Downpatrick and Iona, therefore, may partly exemplify the complex interrelationships within the Irish Sea region.

Iona is popularly said to have been the traditional burial place of Scottish kings from the advent of the Alpínid dynasty. Contemporary evidence for such claims, however, date only to about the twelfth or thirteenth centuries. The so-called traditions, therefore, appear to have been constructed to advance Iona's prestige as a royal burial site, and may well have been instigated and encouraged by the meic Somairle. Iona was certainly the burial place of Ragnall's later descendants, and leading members of West Highland nobility. The oldest intact building on the island is St Oran's Chapel. (Note: The ruinous mediaeval structure was rebuilt in 1957.) Judging from certain Irish influences in its architecture, the chapel is thought to date to about the mid twelfth century. The building is known to have been used as a mortuary house by Ragnall's later descendants, and it is possible that either he or his father were responsible for its erection. On the other hand, it is also possible that the chapel was constructed by the kings of the Crovan dynasty: either Guðrøðr, who was buried on the island in 1188, or else Guðrøðr's father (Ragnall's maternal-grandfather) Óláfr.

=== Saddell Abbey ===
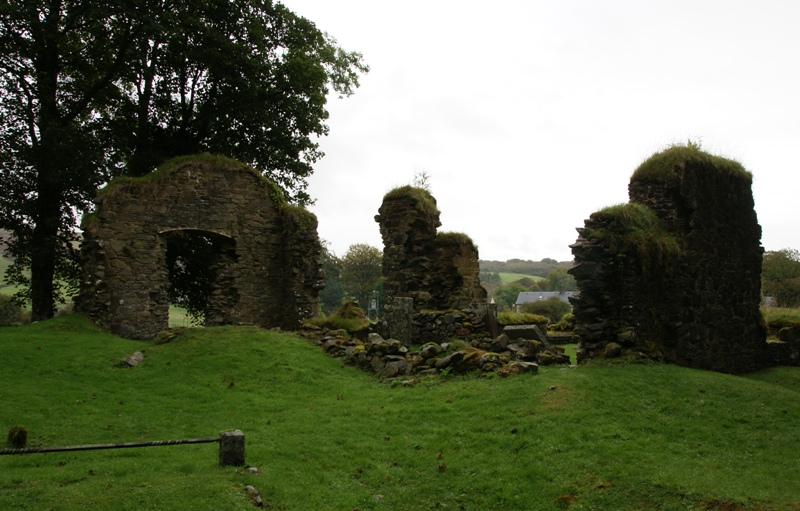
Ruinous Saddell Abbey, founded by either Ragnall or his father

A member of the meic Somairle, possibly Ragnall himself, or else his father, could have founded Saddell Abbey, a rather small Cistercian house, situated in the traditional heartland of the meic Somairle. This, now ruinous monastery, apparently a daughter house of Mellifont Abbey, is the only Cistercian house known to have been founded in the West Highlands. Surviving evidence from the monastery itself suggests that Ragnall was probably the founder. For example, when the monastery's charters were confirmed in 1393 by Pope Clement VII (died 1394), and in 1498 and 1508 by James IV, King of Scots (died 1513), the earliest grant produced by the house was that of Ragnall. Furthermore, the confirmations of 1393 and 1508 specifically state that Ragnall was indeed the founder, as does clan tradition preserved in the Book of Clanranald. However, evidence that Somairle was the founder may be preserved in a thirteenth-century French list of Cistercian houses which names a certain "Sconedale" under the year 1160. (Note: Clement, an antipope formerly known as Robert of Geneva, should not be confused with the like-named sixteenth-century Pope Clement VII (died 1534), a member of the Medici family. In 1378, Pope Gregory XI died, after which Bartholomew Prignano (died 1389) was elected pope in a disputed election, becoming Pope Urban VI. Unfortunately for Urban, those who contested his election elected a pope of their own, the aforesaid Robert, as Pope Clement VII. Each of these simultaneous popes—Urban and Clement—regarded the other as a usurper, and both men enjoyed support from secular contemporaries. Whilst the French and Scots backed Clement, for example, the English backed Urban. Although the two were succeeded by other contested popes, this so-called Great Schism of the late fourteenth and early fifteenth centuries eventually ended in 1417.)

One possibility is that, whilst Somairle may well have begun the planning of a Cistercian house at Saddell, it was actually Ragnall who provided it with its first endowments. Somairle's attempt to relocate Colum Cille's familia to Iona, however, was undertaken during an era when Cistercians were already established in Ireland and the Isles, which may be evidence that Somairle was something of an "ecclesiastical traditionalist" who found newer reformed orders of continental Christianity unpalatable. Whatever the case, the ecclesiastical activities of his immediate descendants, especially the foundations and endowments of Ragnall himself, reveal that the meic Somairle were not averse to such continental orders. During his career, Somairle waged war upon the Scots and perished in an invasion of Scotland proper, which could suggest that Ragnall's ecclesiastical activities were partly undertaken to improve relations with the King of Scots. Additionally, in an age when monasteries were often built by rulers as status symbols of their wealth and power, the foundations and endowments of Ragnall may have been undertaken as a means to portray himself as an up-to-date ruler.

== Death ==
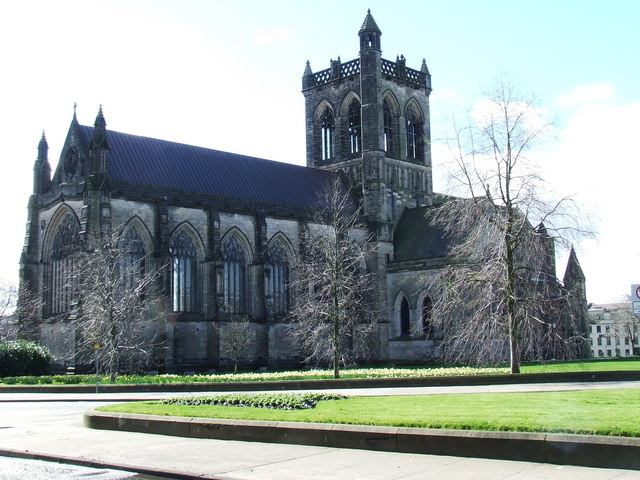
Paisley Abbey. Ragnall's grant to the priory (later abbey) of Paisley may be evidence of an alliance with the kindred who defeated his father. Ragnall may well have ended his days at the monastery.

The year and circumstances of Ragnall's death are uncertain, as surviving contemporary sources failed to mark his demise. According to clan tradition preserved in the Book of Clanranald, Ragnall may have died in 1207. However, no corroborating evidence supports this date, and there is reason to believe that dates in this source are unreliable. In fact, this source misplaces Somairle's death by sixteen years, which may indicate that Ragnall himself died some sixteen years earlier (in 1191). If this date is correct then Ragnall's death may be related to his defeat suffered at the hands of his brother. However, the Chronicle of Mann, which records the 1192 conflict between Ragnall and Áengus, gives no hint of Ragnall's demise in its account. Another possibility is that Ragnall may have been slain sometime around 1209 and 1210, during yet more internal conflict amongst the meic Somairle.

A reanalysis of the Book of Clanranald has shown that, instead of 1207, this source may actually date Ragnall's demise to 1227. (Note: The reasoning is that an ampersand may have been confused as a number.) However, this date may well be too late for man who was an adult by 1164. Ragnall's grant to Paisley may leave clues to his fate. The similarity between this charter and another granted to the priory by his son, Domnall, may be evidence that the documents were drawn up at about the same time. If so, Ragnall's charter may be evidence that he survived his defeat at the hands of Áengus, and the two charters may indicate that Ragnall was nearing the end of his life. (Note: Domnall's charter is the only contemporary source in which he is named.) Ragnall's grant may also indicate that he entered into a confraternity with the monks at Paisley. If the charter was indeed granted near the end of his life, it is also possible that Ragnall ended his days there. Since the priory was one of the religious houses founded by the meic Somairle, his possible retirement there may partly explain why Ragnall disappears from record after 1192.

== Family and legacy ==
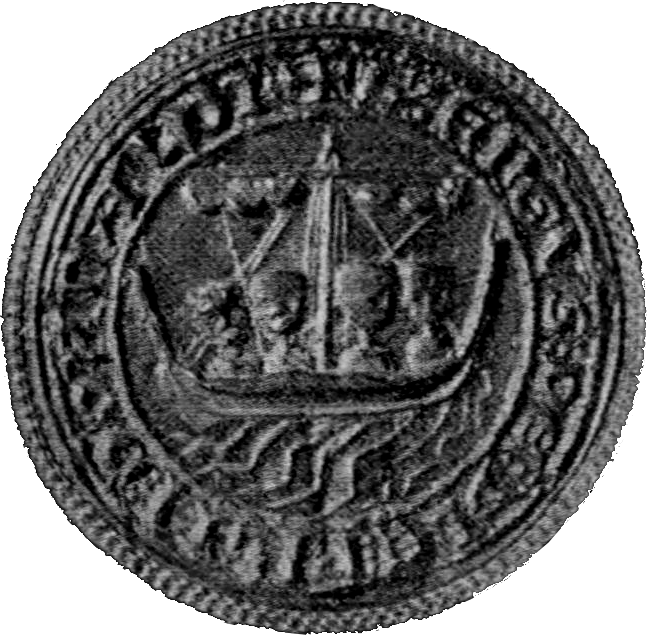
The seal of Ragnall's grandson, Áengus mac Domnaill, Lord of Islay (died c. 1293)

The name of Ragnall's wife, "Fonia", as recorded in their grant to the priory of Paisley, may be an attempt to represent the Gaelic name Findguala in Latin. According to late Hebridean tradition, preserved in the garbled Sleat History, Ragnall was married to "MacRandel's daughter, or, as some say, to a sister of Thomas Randel, Earl of Murray". This tradition cannot be correct due to its chronology, since Thomas Randolph, the first Earl of Moray, and his like-named son and successor, both died in 1332. One possibility, however, is that the tradition may instead refer to an earlier earl—Uilleam mac Donnchada (died 1151–1154). If so, Ragnall's son, Domnall, may have been named after Uilleam's son, Domnall (died 1187). The latter was a leading member of the meic Uilleim, a kindred who were in open conflict against the Scottish kings from the late twelfth to early thirteenth centuries.

Ragnall is known to have left two sons: Ruaidrí (died 1247?) and Domnall. Domnall's line, the meic Domnaill (or Clann Domnaill), went on to produce the powerful Lords of the Isles who dominated the entire Hebrides and expansive mainland-territories from the first half of the fourteenth to the late fifteenth centuries. Ruaidrí founded the meic Ruaidrí (or Clann Ruaidrí), a more obscure kindred who were seated in Garmoran. (Note: Several sources, such as the Book of Ballymote and the MS 1467, claim that Ragnall was actually the father of Dubgall (rather than a brother). The author of the MS 1467, who was almost certainly in the employ of the meic Domnaill, may have set the precedent of disparaging accounts of the meic Dubgaill origins by later clan historians. For example, the Sleat History gives a denigratory account of Dubgall, and claims that he was an illegitimate son of Somairle.) Ruaidrí seems to have been the senior of Ragnall's sons, and is first recorded by name in 1214. Four years previous, Áengus and his sons are recorded by the Chronicle of Mann to have been slain on Skye. This particular record could be evidence that Áengus had succeeded Ragnall, after which the latter's sons extinguished Áengus's line, and Ruaidrí assumed control of the meic Somairle succession.

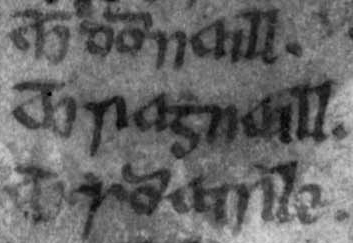
Part of the meic Domnaill pedigree on folio 1v of National Library of Scotland Advocates MS 72.1.1 (also known as MS 1467). The excerpt shows the names of Ragnall's son Domnall (top), Ragnall himself (middle), and Ragnall's father (bottom).

It is very likely that either Ragnall or Ruaidrí had daughters who married Rǫgnvaldr and his younger half-brother, Óláfr Guðrøðarson (died 1237). The chronicle states that Rǫgnvaldr had Óláfr marry "Lauon", the daughter of a certain nobleman from Kintyre, who was also the sister of his own (unnamed) wife. The precise identification of this father-in-law is uncertain, although historical sources concerning the contemporary meic Somairle link this kindred with Kintyre more than any other region, and both Ragnall and Ruaidrí were contemporaneously styled "Lord of Kintyre". It is possible that the first marriage took place sometime before 1210, perhaps not long after 1200, considering the age of Rǫgnvaldr's son, Guðrøðr. These unions appear to have been orchestrated to patch up relations between the meic Somairle and the Crovan dynasty, rival kindreds who had bitterly contested the kingship of the Isles for about sixty years. In fact, it is possible that Rǫgnvaldr's kingship was formally recognised by Ruaidrí, the leading meic Somairle dynast, who thereby established himself as a leading magnate within a reunified Kingdom of the Isles. (Note: The circumstances surrounding the eventual meic Ruaidrí acquisition of Garmoran and the Uists are uncertain. It is possible that the aforesaid marriage alliance with Rǫgnvaldr and his brother may have led to the meic possession of these territories.)

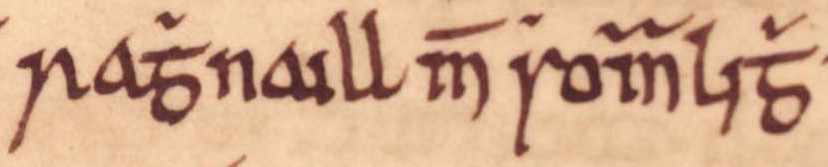
Ragnall's name as it appears on folio 62v of Bodleian Library MS Rawlinson B 489 (the Annals of Ulster). The particular annal-entry in question concerns military actions conducted by unnamed sons of Ragnall in 1212.

Ragnall is chiefly remembered in early modern Hebridean tradition as the genealogical link between Somairle and Domnall later's descendants. Unsupported claims made by the Book of Clanranald present Ragnall as "the most distinguished of the Gall or Gaedhil for prosperity, sway of generosity, and feats of arms", and report that he "received a cross from Jerusalem". The latter statement may imply that Ragnall undertook (or planned to undertake) a pilgrimage or crusade. Although Ragnall's involvement in such an enterprise is not impossible, the claim is uncorroborated by contemporary sources. The mid-sixteenth-century description of the Hebrides and the Islands of the Clyde authored by Donald Monro (died in or after 1575) reveals that Ragnall's reign was still remembered in the Isles during the sixteenth century. In this account, Monro credited Ragnall with establishing the law code administered by leading Hebrideans hundreds of years after his floruit. (Note: Part of Munro's account, which describes how the council convened on Eilean na Comhairle ("council island"), states: "Thir 14 persons sat down into the Councell-Ile and decernit, decreitit and gave suits furth upon all debaitable matters according to the Laws made be Renald M^{c}Somharkle callit in his time King of the Occident Iles ...". Similarities between the fourteen-man council named by Monro, and the list of the signatories of the 'Ellencarne' commission, drawn up on Islay in 1545, may be evidence that Munro's description pertains to the mid sixteenth century, rather than to the fifteenth-century Lordship of the Isles.)

== Ancestry ==
Ancestors of Ragnall mac Somairle

8. Gilla Adamnáin (Note: There are numerous pedigrees outlining the patrilineal ancestry of Clann Domnaill, the descendants of Ragnall's son Domnall. Although these pedigrees take the family's line several generations further back than Gilla Adamnáin, the successive names become more unusual, and the pedigrees begin to contradict each other. Consequently, Gilla Adamnáin may be the furthest the patrilineal line can be taken back with confidence.)
4. Gilla Brigte mac Gilla Adamnáin
2. Somairle mac Gilla Brigte (died 1164)
1. Ragnall mac Somairle (died between 1192–1227)
12. Guðrøðr Crovan (died 1095); King of the Isles, King of Dublin
6. Óláfr Guðrøðarson (died 1153); King of the Isles
3. Ragnhildr Óláfsdóttir
