= Carinish =

Coordinates: 57.522°N 7.312°W

Carinish: Scottish Gaelic: Càirinis
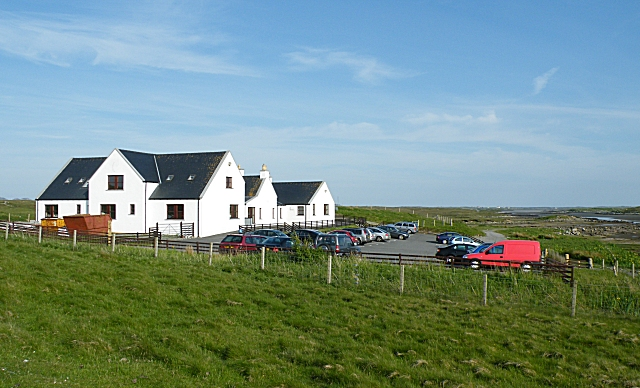
- Free Church at Cairinis

- Location within the Outer Hebrides
- Language: Scottish Gaelic; English
- OS grid reference: NF820604
- Civil parish: North Uist
- Council area: Na h-Eileanan Siar
- Lieutenancy area: Western Isles
- Country: Scotland
- Sovereign state: United Kingdom
- Post town: ISLE OF NORTH UIST
- Postcode district: HS6
- Dialling code: 01876
- Police: Scotland
- Fire: Scottish
- Ambulance: Scottish
- UK Parliament: Na h-Eileanan an Iar
- Scottish Parliament: Na h-Eileanan an Iar

Carinish (Scottish Gaelic: Càirinis), is a hamlet on North Uist, in the Outer Hebrides, Scotland. It is in the south of the island, about two miles (three kilometres) from the causeway to Benbecula. The hamlet is known for the Carinish Stone Circle and the Trinity Temple. Carinish is within the parish of North Uist and is situated on the A865.

== History ==
=== Carinish Stone Circle ===
Carinish Stone Circle is not in good condition – it has the A865 main road running almost through the middle of it. About 50 metres to the north, a Neolithic settlement was found.

=== Trinity Temple ===
Trinity Temple or Teampall na Trionad is the ruins of a 13th-century Augustinian nunnery and "college of learning". It is written in the Red Book of Clanranald that the nunnery was founded by Bethóc, the Prioress of Iona Nunnery and the daughter of Somerled, the ancestor of the Chiefs of Clan MacDougall, the Lords of the Isles, Clan Donald, Clan MacRory, and Clan MacAlister. After probably being enlarged in the late 14th century by Amy MacRuari, divorcee of John, Lord of the Isles, it was again enlarged in the 16th century, and restored in the 19th century, after it was destroyed during the Scottish Reformation. Admission is free and it is open at all times.

=== Battle of Carinish ===
The Battle of Carinish, which was fought between the warriors of Clan MacDonald of Sleat and Clan MacLeod of Dunvegan, took place near the ruins of the nunnery in 1601.

== People connected with Carinish ==
- Dòmhnall Ruadh Chorùna (1887-1967), during his childhood, the Scottish Gaelic Bard and war poet, attended the district school at Carinish, as he later described in his poem Òran na Sgoilearan ("The Song of the Schoolchildren").

== Carinish Inn ==
Carinish contains the modern Carinish Inn, once a landmark hotel in North Uist, which in 2008 was sold to the Free Church of Scotland to be transformed into a church.

== Gallery ==
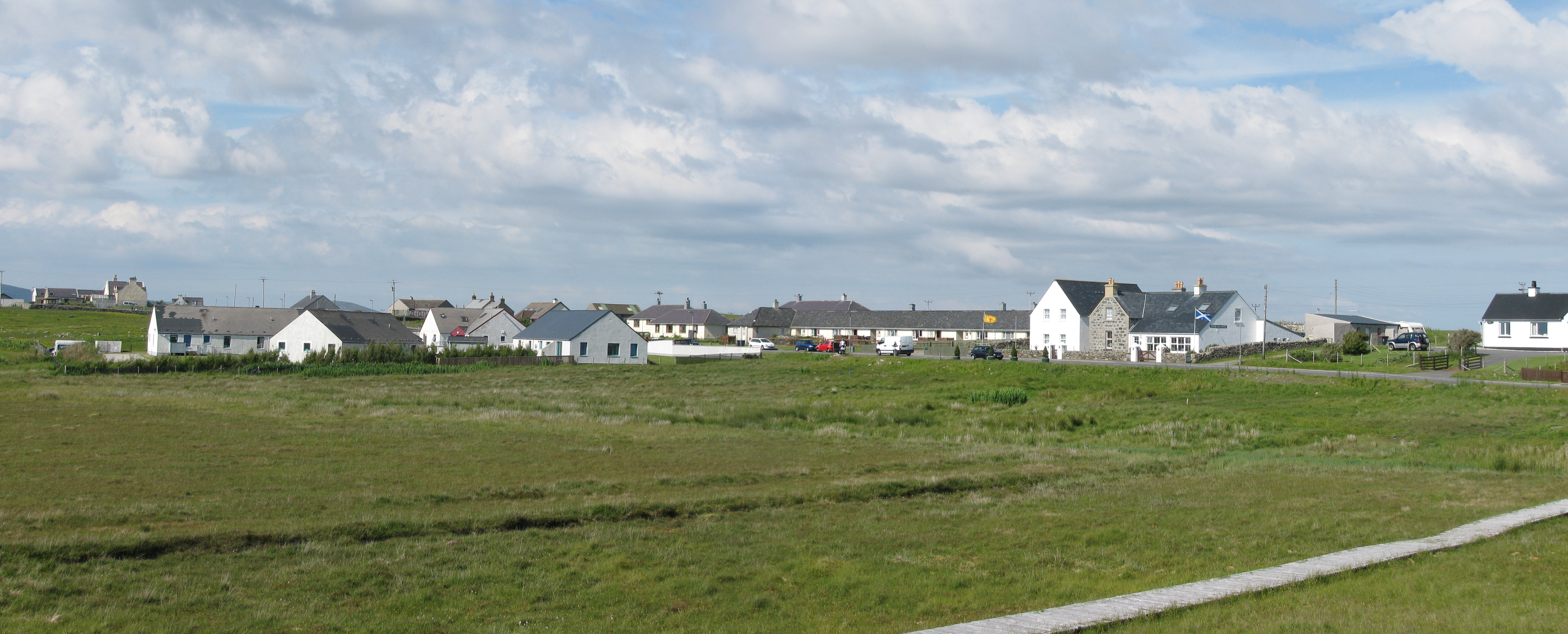
Carinish with the battlefield

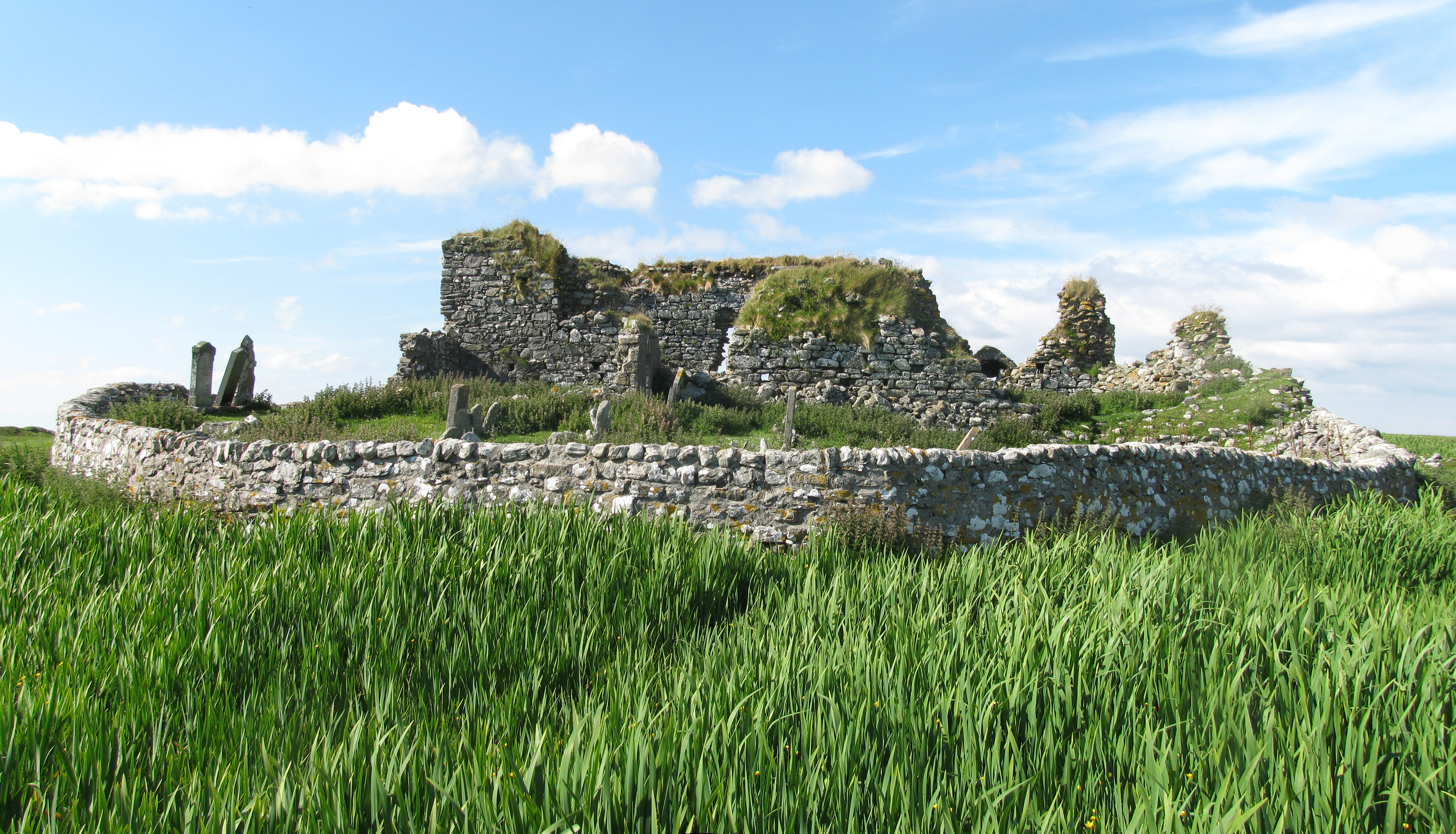
The Teampull na Trionad

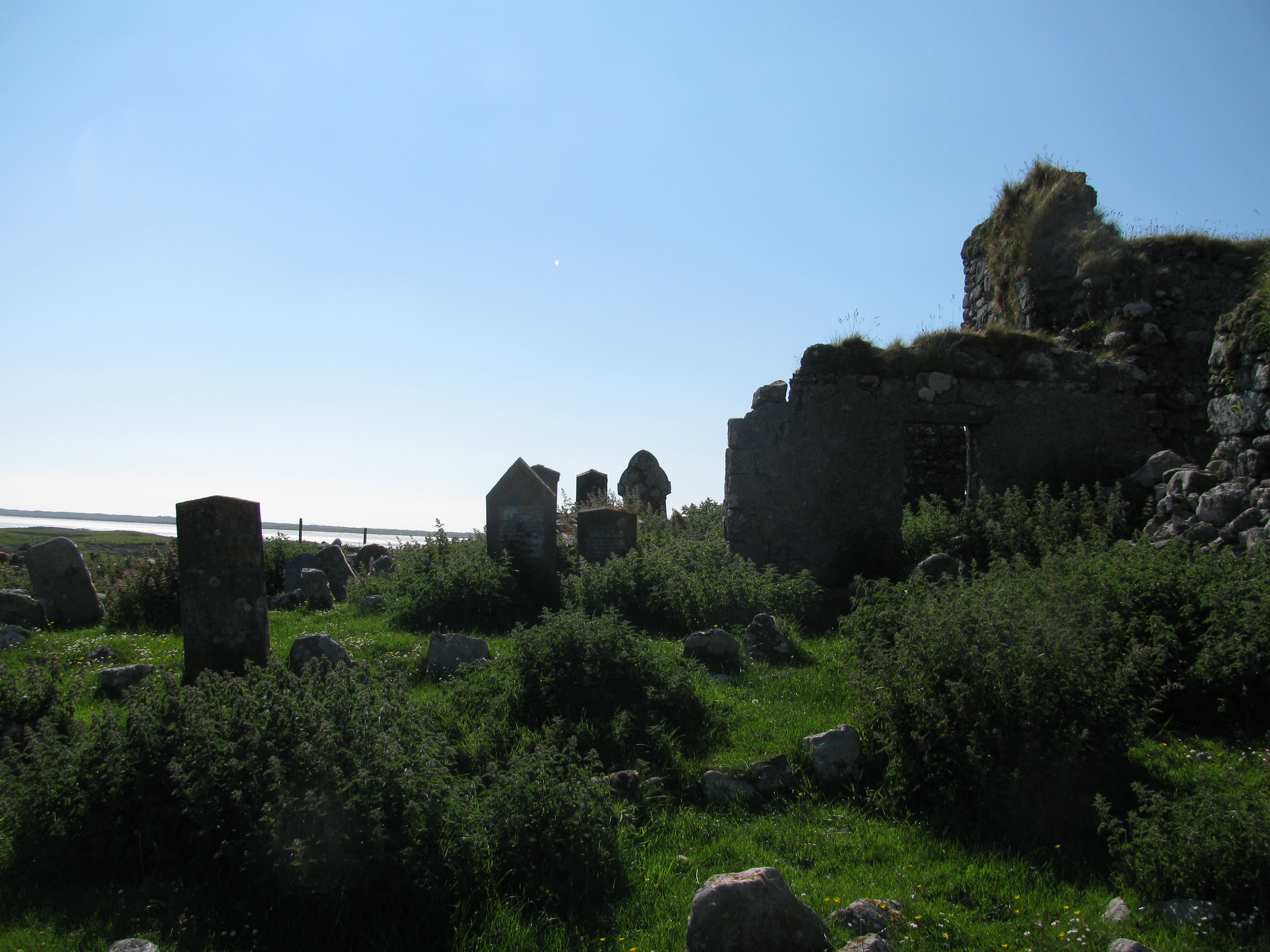
The Graveyard of the Teampull na Trionad
