= Iona Nunnery =

Augustinian convent in Scotland

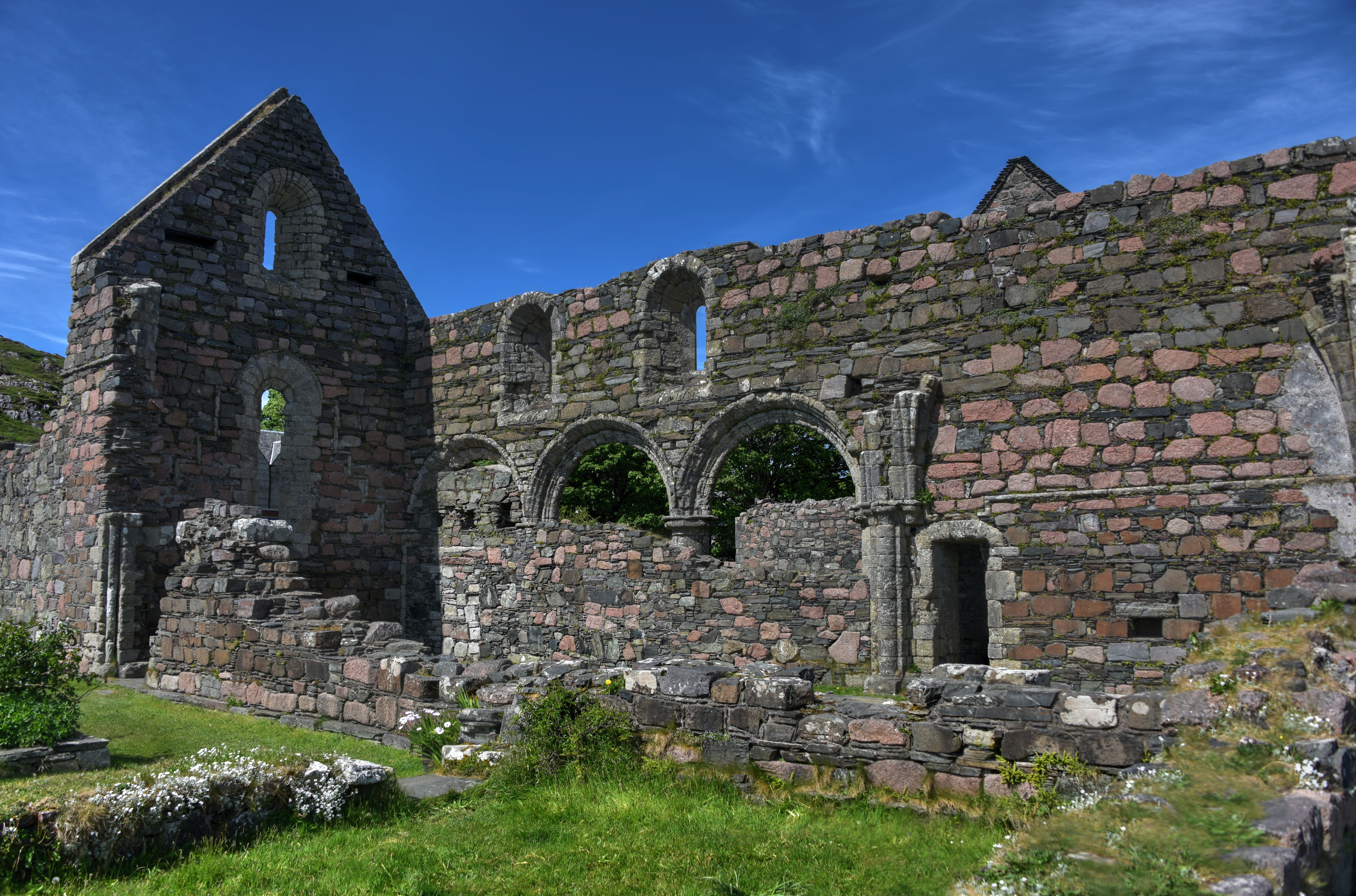
Ruins of the Iona Nunnery

The Iona Nunnery was an Augustinian convent of nuns located on the island of Iona in the Inner Hebrides of Scotland. It was established sometime after the foundation of the nearby Benedictine monastery in 1203 by Ranald, son of Somerled. Bethóc, daughter of Somerled, and sister of Ranald, was first prioress. The ruins of the nunnery stand in a peaceful precinct adjacent to Iona's main (and only) village, Baile Mor. They form the most complete remains of a medieval nunnery extant in Scotland. After the Reformation, the priory was dissolved and reduced to a ruin.

== History ==
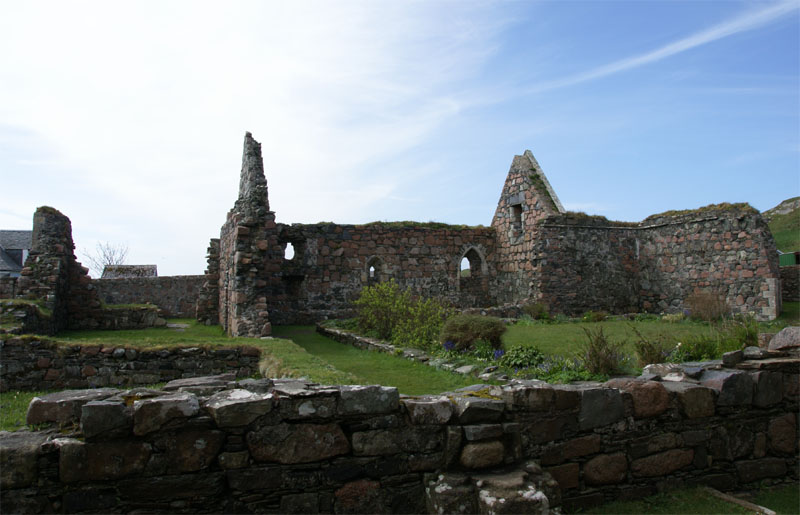
Iona Nunnery refectory

The nunnery was founded after the establishment of the Benedictine monastery, founded by Ragnall mac Somairle in 1203. Raghnall's sister, Bethóc, became the first prioress. This was one of the three Augustinian monasteries of women in Scotland, St Leonard's Nunnery at Perth and Teampull na Trionaid at Carinish in North Uist being the other two.

In the Abbey museum of the nearby Iona Abbey, the top half of a headstone of Anna MacLean, a prioress of the monastery of nuns who died in 1543, is on display.

Restoration work on the nunnery occurred in 1923 and 1993.

== Construction ==
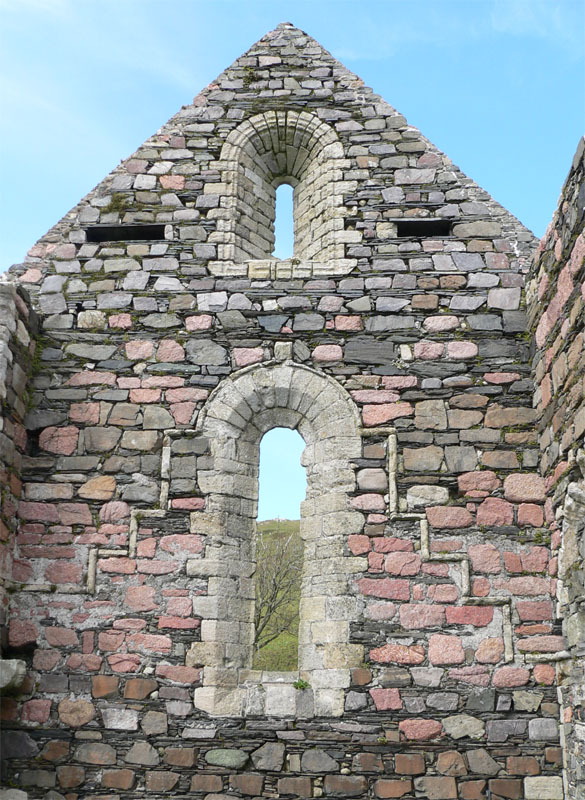
Iona Nunnery - church detail

The construction of the Iona Nunnery follows the typical Irish style. The Church consists of a building with three bays with a passage to the north side and a small chapel on the east side of the passage. The monastic cloister measures 14 metres square, but it was originally smaller. The east wing had three rooms on ground level, above was the dormitory. The south wing contained the refectory. In the sixteenth century a floor was added. The west wing is below the modern road and was most likely the guests wing.

== Management ==
The Iona Nunnery is managed by Historic Environment Scotland and is a scheduled monument.
