= Teampull na Trionaid =

Nunnery in the Outer Hebrides, Scotland

Coordinates: 57.5203°N 7.3201°W

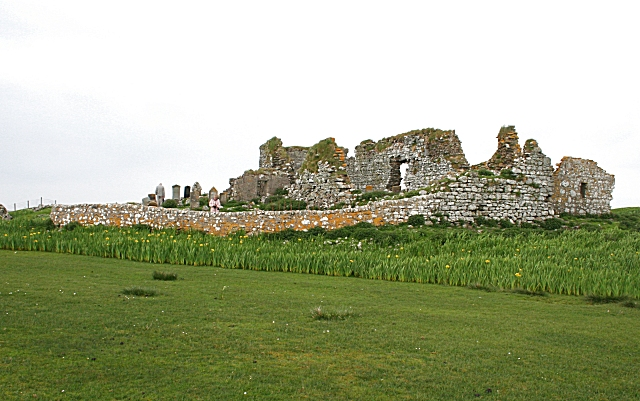
The ruins of Teampull na Trionaid

Teampull na Trionaid ("Trinity church") is a ruined 13th-century Augustinian nunnery at Carinish, on North Uist, in the Outer Hebrides of Scotland. It is believed to have been a daughter foundation of Iona Nunnery.

== History ==
An entry in the Red Book of Clanranald reads "Beathag, daughter of Somerled, was a religious woman and a Black Nun. It is she that erected Teampall Chairinis in Uist."

Bethóc (or Beathag) was prioress of Iona Nunnery in about 1203. However, the Islands were still under Norse rule, though many of the Norse families would have become Christian by then.

Amie mac Ruari is said to have rebuilt the church in the 14th century after her divorce from John of Islay, Lord of the Isles.

In 1389, Godfrey, the son of John of Islay and Amie Mac Ruari, confirmed a grant to the Abbey of Inchaffray by his mother's aunt Christina of Sancta Trinita in Chairinis, so the original grant must have been at least two generations before.

During the Scottish Reformation, however, the families of Roman Catholic priests and those of the tacksmen and Clan Chiefs all attempted to claim Church lands for their own. Since then, the convent has been in ruins.

The Battle of Carinish, which was fought between the warriors of Clan MacDonald of Sleat and Clan MacLeod of Dunvegan, took place near the ruins of the nunnery in 1601.

According to Bill Lawson, "It is said that the Teampull in its early days was a college of learning - even that it was the first university." According to Lawson, "T.S. Muir stated in 1867 that he was told 'that one Macpherson, an octogenarian living at Cladach Cairinis, remembers having seen, when a boy, stones figured with angels, armed men, animals, etc.' This must have been John MacPherson -- Iain Mac Eoghainn - whose descendants still live in the township. The description of the stones suggests something like the scenes on the tomb of Alasdair Crotach MacLeod in St Clement's Church in Roghadal in Harris, but any such stones have long since disappeared. Alexander Carmichael surmises that, being of freestone, they were carried away for sharpening stones. Carmichael also states that there was formerly a pinnacle on the east gable, with the figure of a three-headed giant on the top, presumably representing the Trinity, but that too had long gone. One stone, carved in the shape of a human head, has been preserved, and is now in the museum of Taigh Chearsabhagh in Loch nam Madadh."

Rev. Kenneth MacLeod of Gigha, who collaborated with Marjory Kennedy-Fraser in collecting Scottish Gaelic songs, wrote in 1907, "In the early days of the nineteenth century, the North Uist people, on a day still spoken of, reverently laid in their Temple of the Trinity an unknown body washed ashore by the flowing tide: at twilight a mysterious-looking barge glided into the bay, three of its crew marched up silently to the temple, opened the newly-made grave, carried off the body, and then disappeared forever into the darkness and the great open sea."

== Current status ==
The ruins are protected as a scheduled monument.
