= Bethóc, Prioress of Iona =

13th-century Scottish prioress

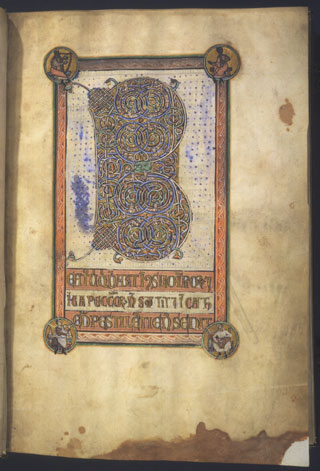
The Iona Psalter, which may have been owned by Bethóc.

Bethóc ingen Somairle (Note: Bethóc appears in modern English-language secondary sources under various names: Beatrice, Bethag, and Bethoc.) was a 13th-century Scottish prioress, considered to have been the first of Iona Nunnery. She was a daughter of Somairle mac Gilla Brigte.

In about 1203, Bethóc's brother, Ragnall mac Somairle, founded the Benedictine Iona Abbey. Sometime afterwards, he founded the Augustinian nunnery on Iona. The precise foundation date of the Benedictine and Augustinian houses are unknown. According to the Book of Clanranald, Bethóc was a "black nun", while the History of the MacDonalds states that she was prioress of Iona. That Bethóc was associated with Iona, as claimed by these clan-traditions, is corroborated by an inscribed stone on Iona. In about 1695, Martin Martin described the Gaelic inscription to have read "Behag nijn Sorle vic Ilvrid priorissa" (which translates as "Prioress Bethóc, daughter of Somairle, son of Gilla Brigte"). The transcription was still legible in the 19th century. (Note: In the early 19th century, the inscription was recorded to have read "Behag Niin Shorle vic Ilvrid Priorissa".)

According to Bill Lawson, an entry in the Red Book of Clanranald reads, Beathog inghen Shomhuirle do bhi na mnaoi riagalta & na cailligh duibh. Also do thoguibh Teampall Chairinis anuibhist.

"Beathag, daughter of Somerled, was a religious woman and a Black Nun. It is she that erected Teampall Chairinis in Uist."

Bill Lawson writes, "It is known that Beathag was prioress of Iona in about 1203, the only problem in the ascription to her being that the Islands were still under Norse rule, though of course many of the Norse families would have become Christianized by then."

It has been suggested that Bethóc was the original owner of the Iona Psalter, now preserved in the National Library of Scotland. The psalter appears to have been illuminated in Oxford, in the 13th century. If it was indeed intended for an Ionan prioress, it is uncertain if the psalter ever made it to Iona.
