= Battle of Carinish =

Scottish clan battle fought in North Uist in 1601

Coordinates: 57.5225°N 7.3158°W

- Part of Clan MacDonald - Clan MacLeod feud
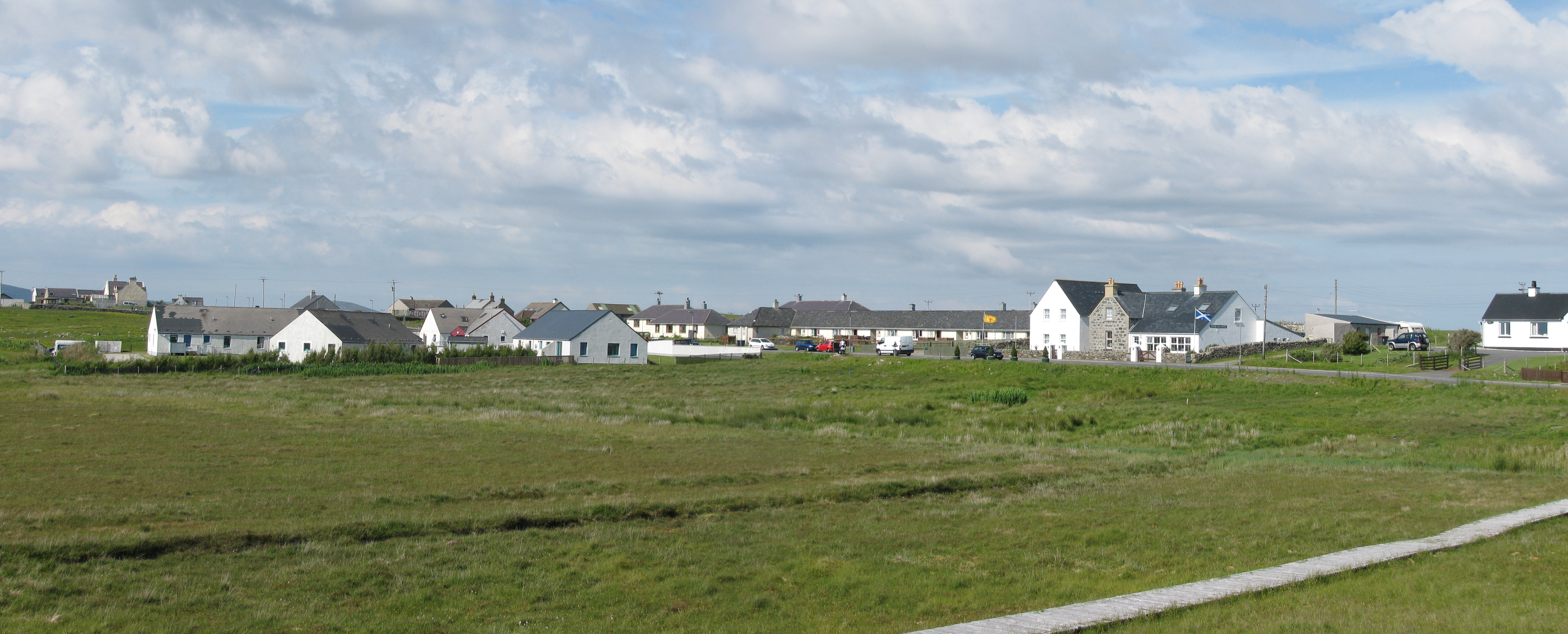
- The battlefield at Carinish
Date	Summer 1601
Location	Carinish, North Uist grid reference NF819605
Result	MacDonald victory

Belligerents
Clan MacDonald of Sleat	Clan MacLeod

Commanders and leaders
Donald MacDonald	Donald MacLeod

Strength
15	40

Casualties and losses
Unknown	38

The Battle of Carinish was a Scottish clan battle fought in North Uist in 1601. It was part of a year of feuding between Clan MacLeod of Dunvegan and the Clan MacDonald of Sleat, that ended with a MacDonald victory and an enforced peace.

== Background ==
In 1601, Donald Gorm Mor MacDonald (Dòmhnall Gorm Mor MacDhòmhnall) rejected his wife, a sister of Rory MacLeod (Ruaraidh MacLeòid) of Harris and Dunvegan. MacLeod responded to this slight by devastating the Trotternish peninsula in the north of Skye, which prompted MacDonald to attack MacLeod land in Harris.

== Battle ==
In turn MacLeod raided North Uist, sending 40 men under his cousin Donald Glas MacLeod to seize goods that the locals had put for safety in the Trinity Temple at Carinish. On hearing this, Donald MacIain 'ic Sheumais (Donald, son of John, son of James) of Clan Ranald gathered his 12 gillemores and bound for Carinish. On his way, his force was augmented to 15. They arrived early in the forenoon and successfully surprised raiders as they feasted in the church. Only two MacLeods survived; Donald MacLeod was among the dead. Donald MacIain 'ic Sheumais suffered a serious arrow wound, but soon recovered. Tradition has it that the song 'Ic Iain 'Ic Sheumais was composed by his foster-mother to soothe his pain.

The Battle of Carinish is said to be the last engagement fought with bows and arrows in the British Isles, though such an engagement may have taken place in England in 1642.

== Aftermath ==
Three weeks later, on his way back to Skye to report his victory, a violent snow storm forced Donald MacIain 'ic Sheumais to seek shelter at Rodel in Harris. He told only his godson, who was at Rodel as page to Rory MacLeod. As Rory MacLeod looked out at the storm, he exclaimed to his page that "on such a night he would not refuse shelter even to his greatest enemy, even Donald MacIain 'ic Sheumais". The page immediately took Rory at his word and informed him that Donald was indeed requesting shelter. Donald and his men were given hospitality by the MacLeods. The tension at dinner was severe and violence was only avoided by Rory's firmness. Early in the night the page told the Macdonalds that the wind was fair for Skye and they wisely departed; before dawn, MacLeod clansmen set fire to their quarters without the knowledge of their chief. As the Macdonalds sailed away, their piper played the tune "The MacLeods are disgraced".

After another MacLeod defeat at the Battle of Coire Na Creiche, the Privy Council of Scotland intervened to end the feud. The peace was celebrated with three weeks of feasting and festivities at Dunvegan Castle. Apart from a brief flare-up in 1603, that was the end of violence between the two clans.

== In popular culture ==
The events are the subject of a comic folk song by Glasgow folk singer Matt McGinn. The song is called The One-Eyed Woman.

== Gallery ==
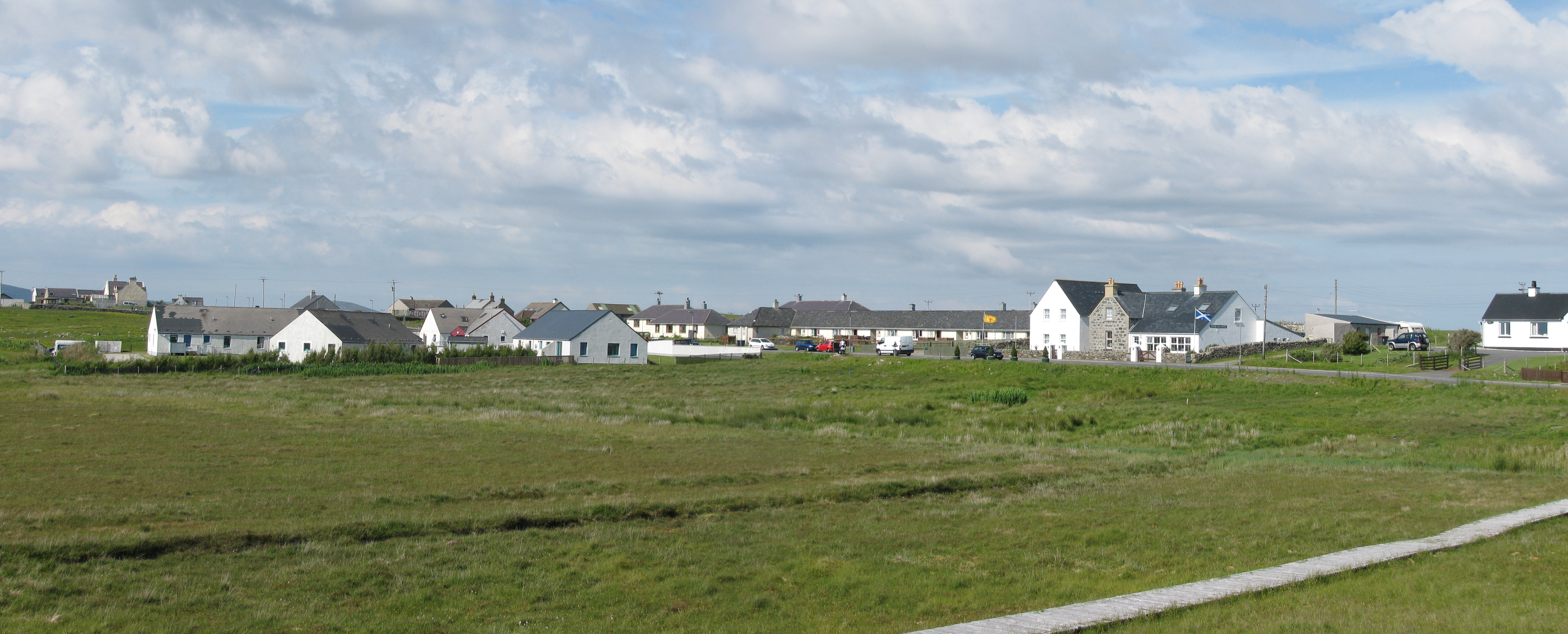
Carinish with the battlefield

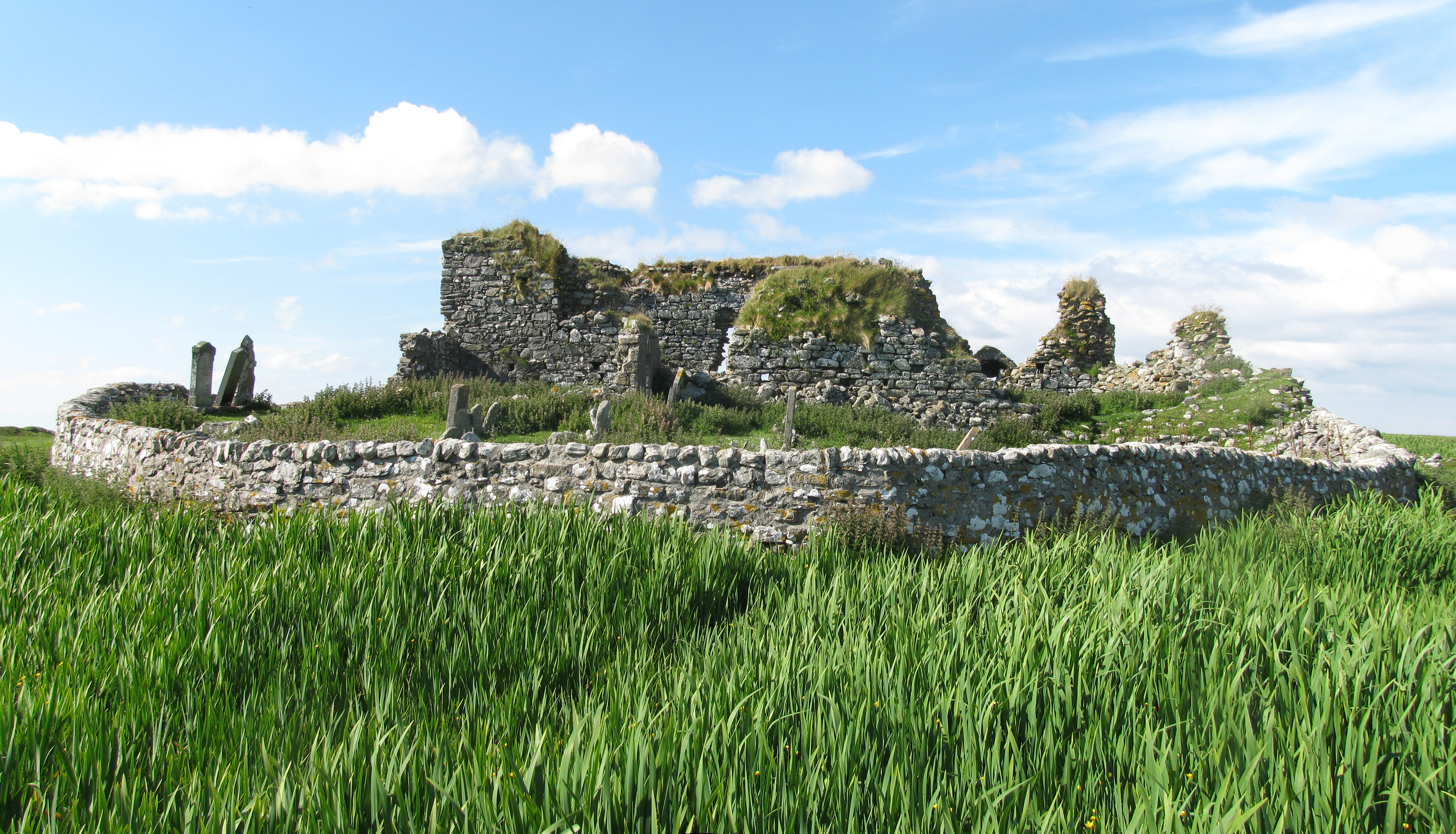
The Teampull na Trionad

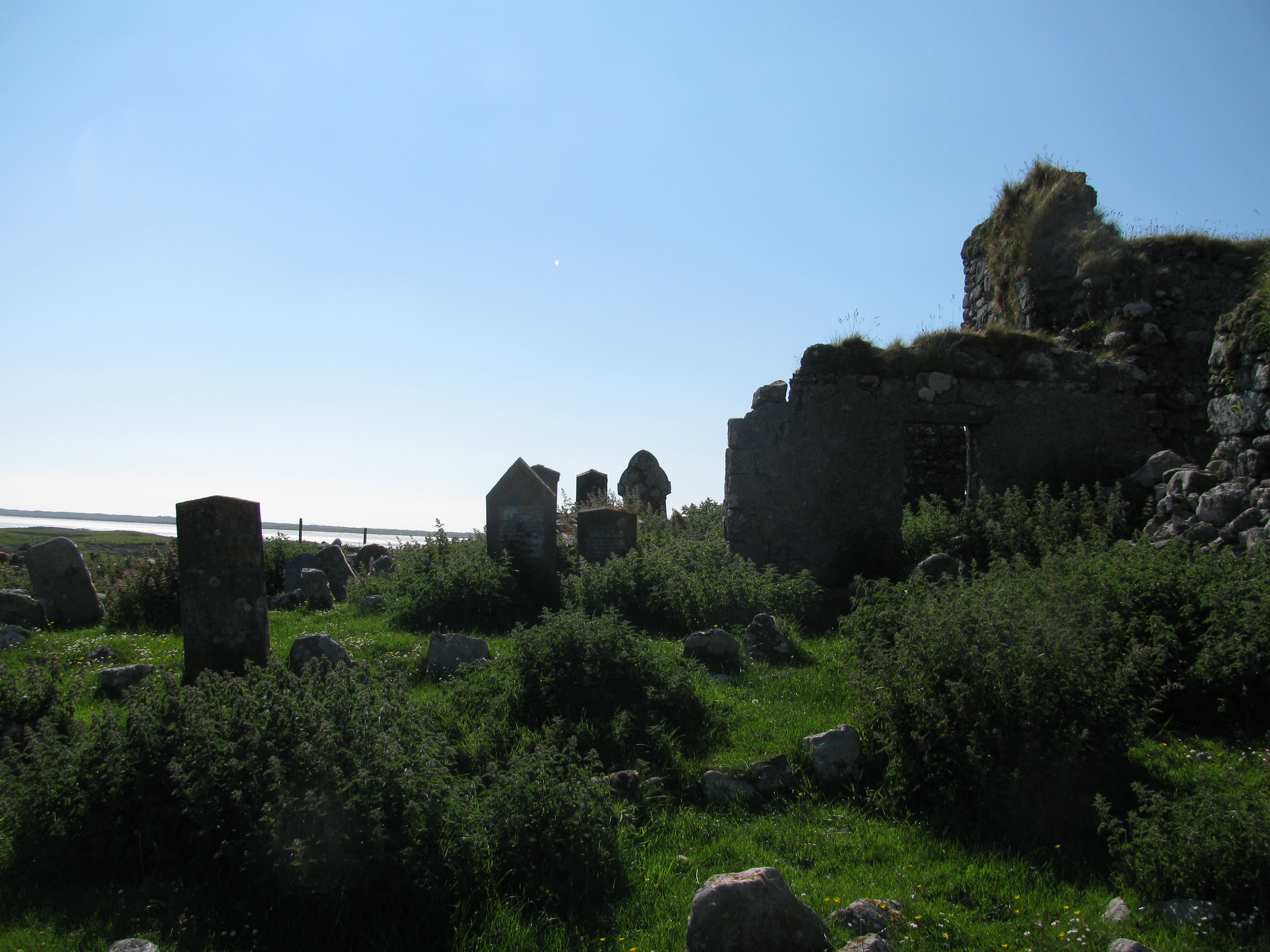
The Graveyard of the Teampull na Trionad

== Bibliography ==
- Roberts, John Leonard (1999), Feuds, Forays and Rebellions: History of the Highland Clans, 1475-1625, Edinburgh University Press, pp. 140–1, ISBN 978-0-7486-6244-9 Seems largely based on the account in Conflicts of the Clans.
