= Books of Clanranald =

18th century manuscript compilation of Scottish clan history

The Red Book, on display in the National Museum of Scotland, Edinburgh

The Books of Clanranald are two paper manuscripts that date to about the early 18th century. The books are written in Classical Gaelic, and are best known for their traditional account of the history of Clan Donald. The manuscripts are commonly referred to as the Red Book and the Black Book. The name "Red Book", however, may actually be a misnomer. Although Gaelic tradition on South Uist notes a "Red Book of MacMhuirich", it is uncertain whether this book is identical to the surviving manuscript. In fact, the manuscript may be partly derived from the red book of tradition. The name "Black Book" may have been coined in order to distinguish it from the so-called Red Book.

The Red Book was composed by Niall MacMhuirich, a member of the MacMhuirich bardic family, who wrote the clan history within, and was responsible for the collection of some of the manuscript's other poetical material. A later hand also added material into the book.

Compared to the Red Book, the Black Book is more of a miscellaneous collection of material. This manuscript was compiled by several people, but the history within this work was written by Christopher Beaton, a member of the Beaton learned family, who appears to have been employed by the family of the Earls of Antrim.

David Sellar, who was the Lord Lyon King of Arms in Scotland, stated that both books date from the late 17th and early 18th centuries.

== Published edition ==
- Macbain, Alexander; Kennedy, John, eds. (1894), "The Book of Clanranald", Reliquiæ Celticæ: texts, papers and studies in Gaelic literature and philology, vol. 2, The Northern Counties Newspaper and Printing and Publishing Company, pp. 138–309.
