= Affrica =

Affrica may refer to:

- Affreca de Courcy, thirteenth-century member of the Crovan dynasty, wife of John de Courcy
- Aufrica de Connoght, fourteenth-century Manx claimant

== See also ==
- Cosmographia et geographia de Affrica
- Aifric (name), modern version of the name
- Africa, a continent
