= Aifric (name) =

Aifric (Middle Irish: Affraic) is an Irish language feminine given name. Affraic is attested as a name borne by women of Gaelic background, between the 8th and 15th centuries. Described as "now very rare" in 1923, it has been revived somewhat in Ireland as part of a general increase in the use of Irish-language names.

== Notable people ==
Medieval

- Aifricci, abbess of Kildare, died 743.
- Affraic, abbess of Kildare, died 833.
- Affraic, daughter of Fergus of Galloway who married Óláfr Guðrøðarson in the 1130s
- Affreca de Courcy, wife of John de Courcy and daughter of Guðrøðr Óláfsson, died in or after 1216.
- Aufrica de Connoght, claimant to Mann and the Isles
- Aiffric, daughter of Briain Ui Raighillaigh and wife of Briain Meg Tigernain, died 1365.
- Aiffric, daughter of Aodh Uí Néill and wife of Henri Aimhreidh Uí Néill, died 1389.
- Aiffric, daughter of Ua Banain and wife of Philip Mag Uidhir, died 1468.
- Aiffric, daughter of Emaínn son of Tomas Mag Uidhir and wife of Cairpre, son of Aedh Ua Neill, died 1479.

Modern

- Aifric Keogh (b. 1992), Irish Olympic rower, bronze medal coxless four, Tokyo 2021.
- Aifric Mac Aodha (b. 1979), poet and editor of Irish-language journal Comhar, born 1979.
- Aifric Campbell, author.
- Afric McGlinchey, poet, book editor , reviewer and critic ; winner of the 2010 Hennessy Poetry Award . Lives in West Cork.

== Fictional characters ==
- Aifric - title character of an Irish-language TV series aimed at young teenagers.
- "When Aifric and I put in at that little creek", a poem by Paul Muldoon.

== See also ==
- List of Irish-language given names
