= Aufrica de Connoght =

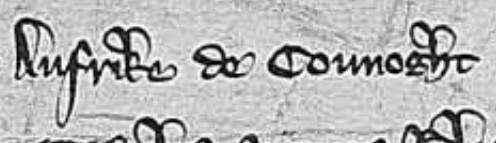
Aufrica's name as it appears in a petition regarding her claims as an heiress of Magnús Óláfsson.

Aufrica de Connoght, also known as Affrica de Counnought, Affreca de Counnoght, Auffricia de Connaught, and Aufrica de Cunnoght, was a fourteenth-century woman who claimed to be an heiress of Magnús Óláfsson, King of Mann and the Isles, and who had some sort of connection with Simon de Montagu.

== Manx claims ==
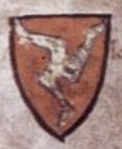
Coat of arms of the King of Mann, as depicted by the late thirteenth-century Armorial Wijnbergen. (Note: The coat of arms seems to have been first associated with Mann after the Scots took possession of the island in the last half of the thirteenth century. The adoption of a new heraldic device—the triskeles—may have been used as a means of reinforcing the new regime on the island.)

In 1264, with the collapse of Norwegian sovereignty along the western seaboard of Scotland, Alexander III, King of Scotland forced the submission of Magnús Óláfsson, King of Mann and the Isles. The following year, Magnús died without a legitimate heir, and his island realm was annexed by Alexander. After the latter's death in 1286, Edward I, King of England claimed overlordship of Scotland, and subsequently recognised John Balliol as King of Scotland in 1292.

In 1293, almost certainly as a result of the significant English influence upon John's fledgling regime, Aufrica appealed to John and Edward, concerning rights she claimed to Mann as an alleged heiress of Magnús. Later in 1304, Aufrica quitclaimed these claimed rights to Simon de Montagu. Although it is possible that she and Simon were married at about this point, there is no specific evidence of such a union. In any case, Simon later sought to seize control of the island, and in so doing incurred the wrath of Edward II, King of England, who pardoned Simon for his actions against the island in 1313. Later in the century, Simon's grandson, William de Montagu, Earl of Salisbury, inherited Simon's rights to Mann. (Note: In 1333, Edward II quitclaimed the Plantagenets' rights to the island to William. Aufrica appears in the two existing versions of the Salisbury Roll of Arms. The earliest of these versions dates to the mid fifteenth century. Although this source is admittedly late, it reveals how contemporary members of the Montagu family perceived themselves. Instead tracing the ultimate origins of the family, the roll starts with Simon as Aufrica's heir.) Aufrica was not the only contemporary claimant to Mann. In 1305, the claims of a Maria, daughter of Rǫgnvaldr Óláfsson, King of Mann and the Isles, were pursued by her grandson, John Waldeboef.

Although John de Courcy is not known to have had any legitimate children, Aufrica's claim to Mann could indicate that she was a granddaughter of John and his wife, Affrica, daughter of Guðrøðr Óláfsson, King of Dublin and the Isles. If so, Aufrica would have probably been named after her grandmother, who was in turn probably named after her own grandmother, Affraic, daughter of Fergus, Lord of Galloway.
