= Grey Abbey, Down =

Ruined Cistercian abbey in Down, Ireland

Coordinates: 54°32′09″N 5°33′30″W

Grey Abbey
- An Mhainistir Liath
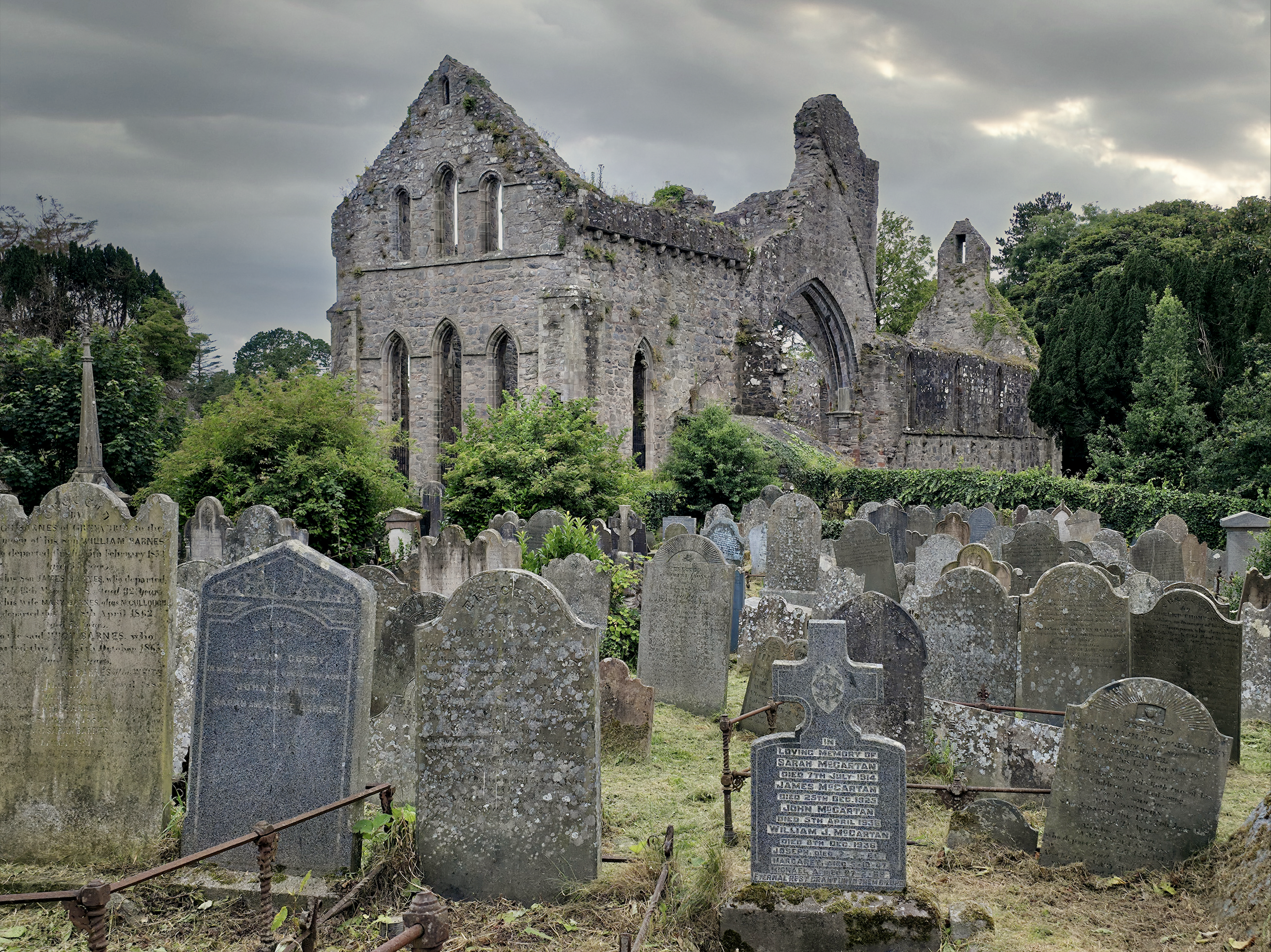

Monastery information
- Order: Cistercian
- Established: 1193

People
- Founder(s): Affreca de Courcy

Architecture
- Status: Inactive

Site
- Public access: Yes

Grey Abbey (Irish: An Mhainistir Liath) is a ruined Cistercian priory in Greyabbey, County Down, Northern Ireland. Currently maintained by the Northern Ireland Environment Agency, it is a monument in state care in the townland of Rosemount, on the eastern edge of the village of Greyabbey in the Ards and North Down local government district.

== History ==
Grey Abbey was founded in 1193 by John de Courcy's wife, Affreca.

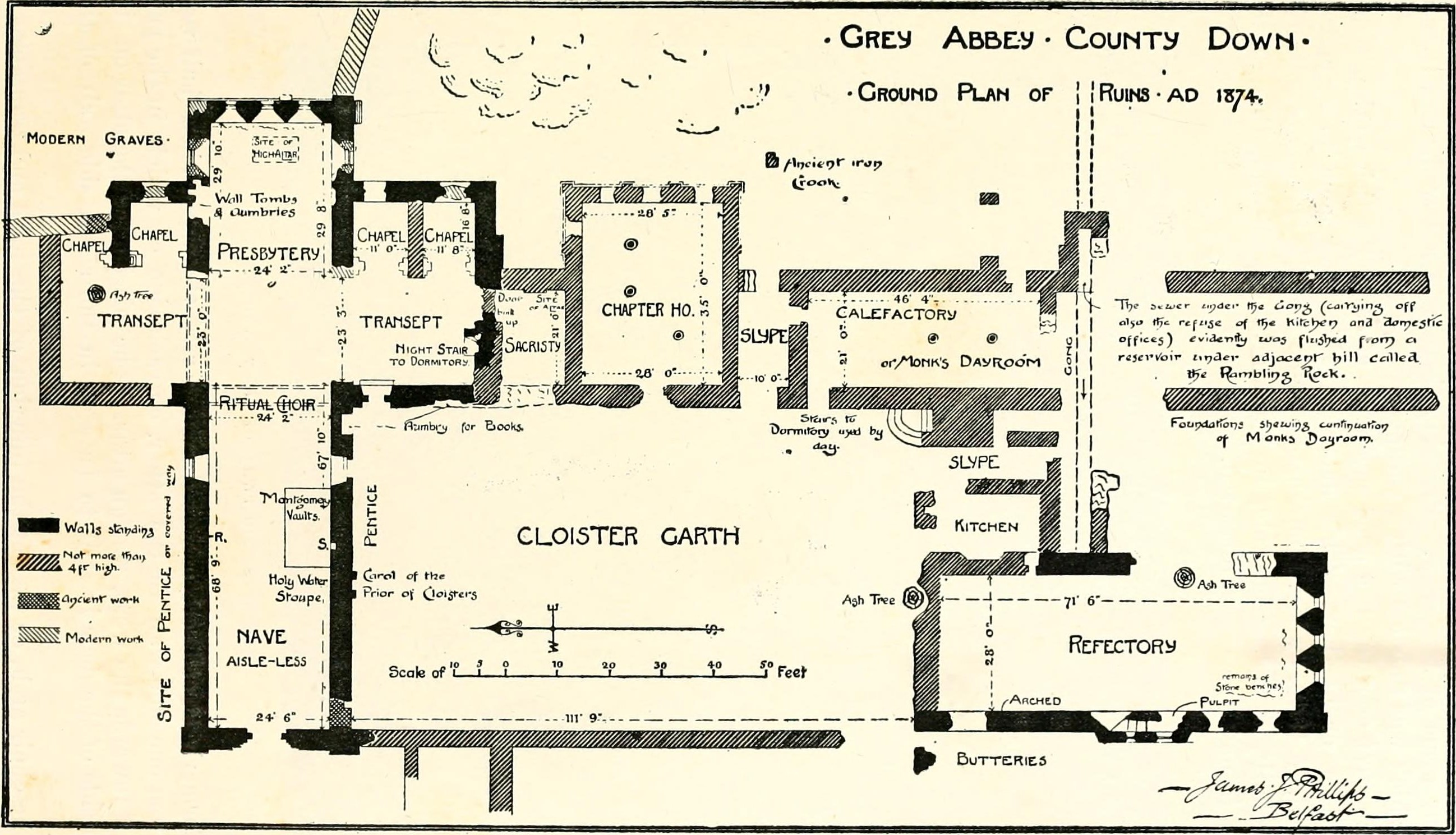
Plan of the abbey, drawn in 1874.

Grey Abbey is unique among Cistercian sites in that it had a female patron.

The pointed arches on the lancet windows and elsewhere in the abbey are one of the earliest examples of Early Gothic architecture in the island of Ireland, and the earliest example in what is now Northern Ireland.

== Gallery ==
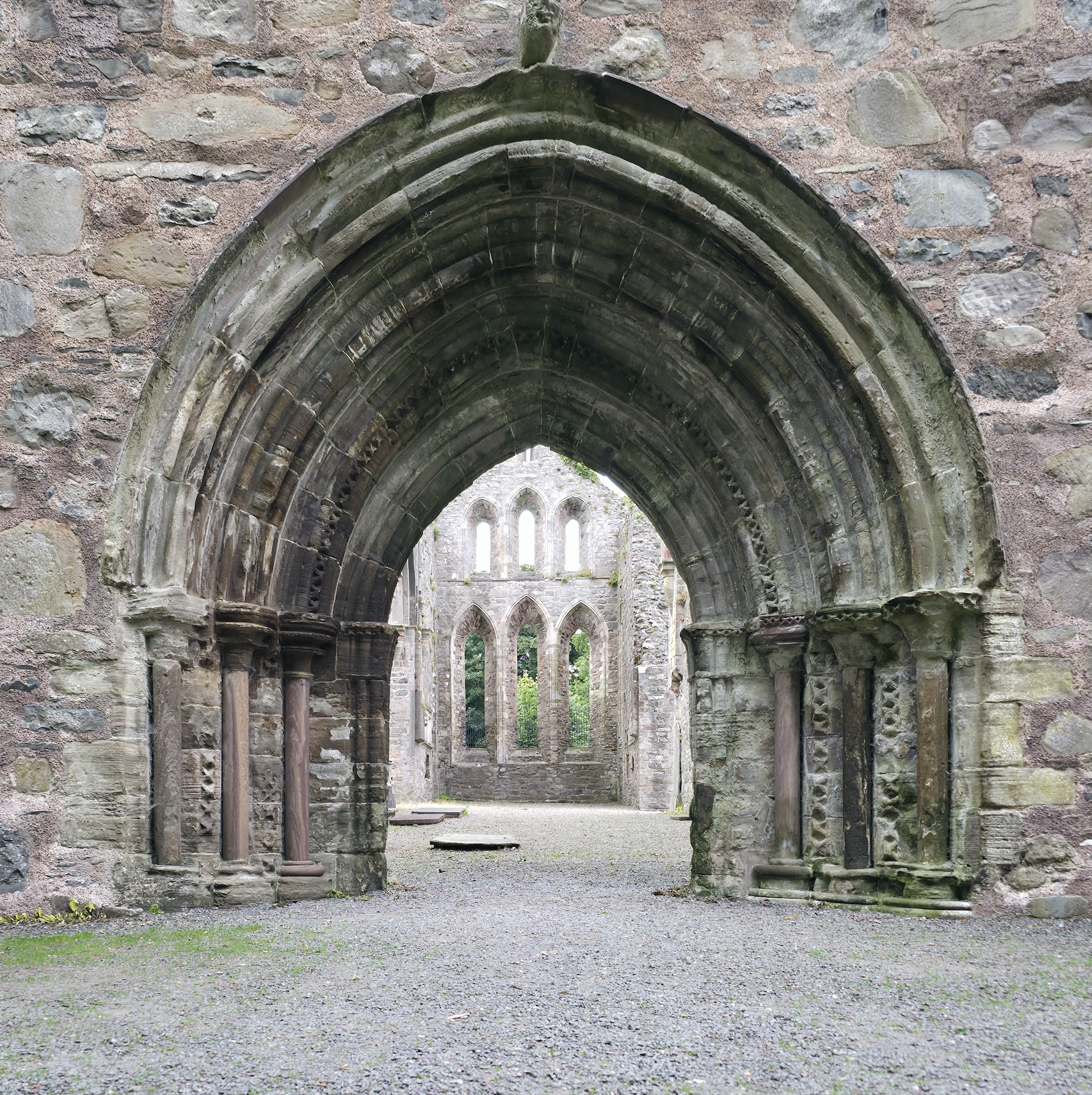
West Doorway

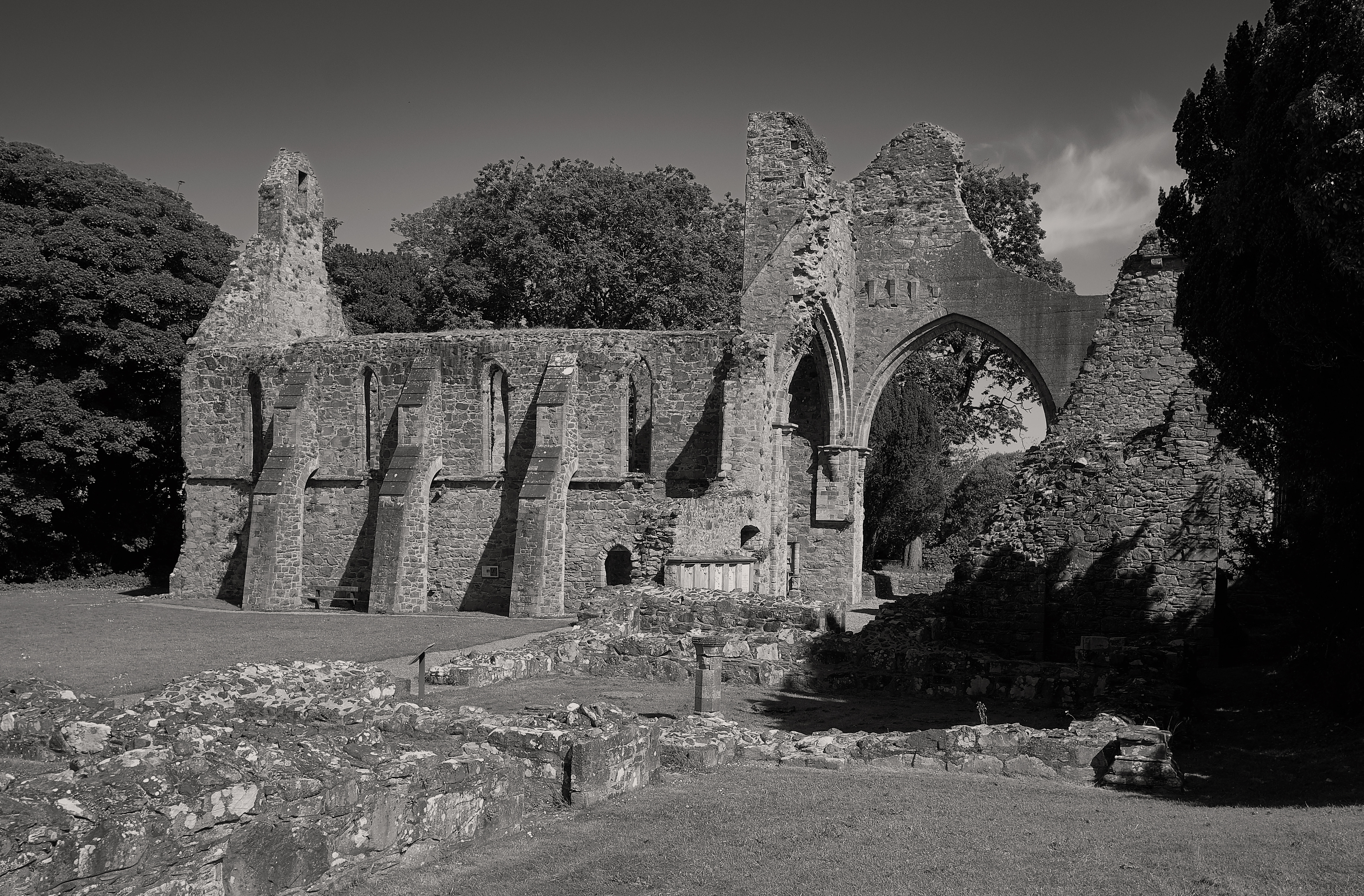
View of Grey Abbey, County Down, Northern Ireland

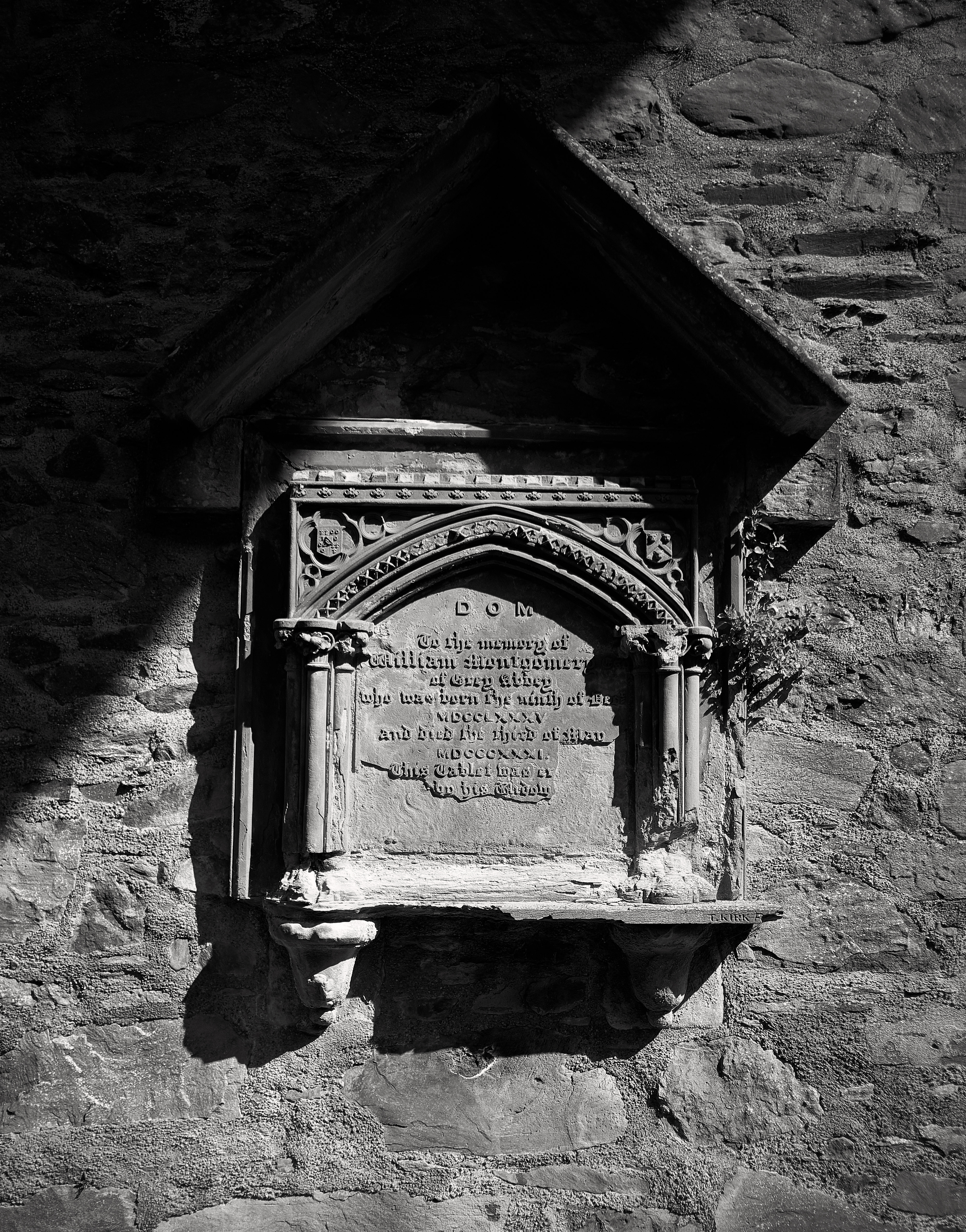
Detail of Memorial Plaque, Grey Abbey, County Down, Northern Ireland

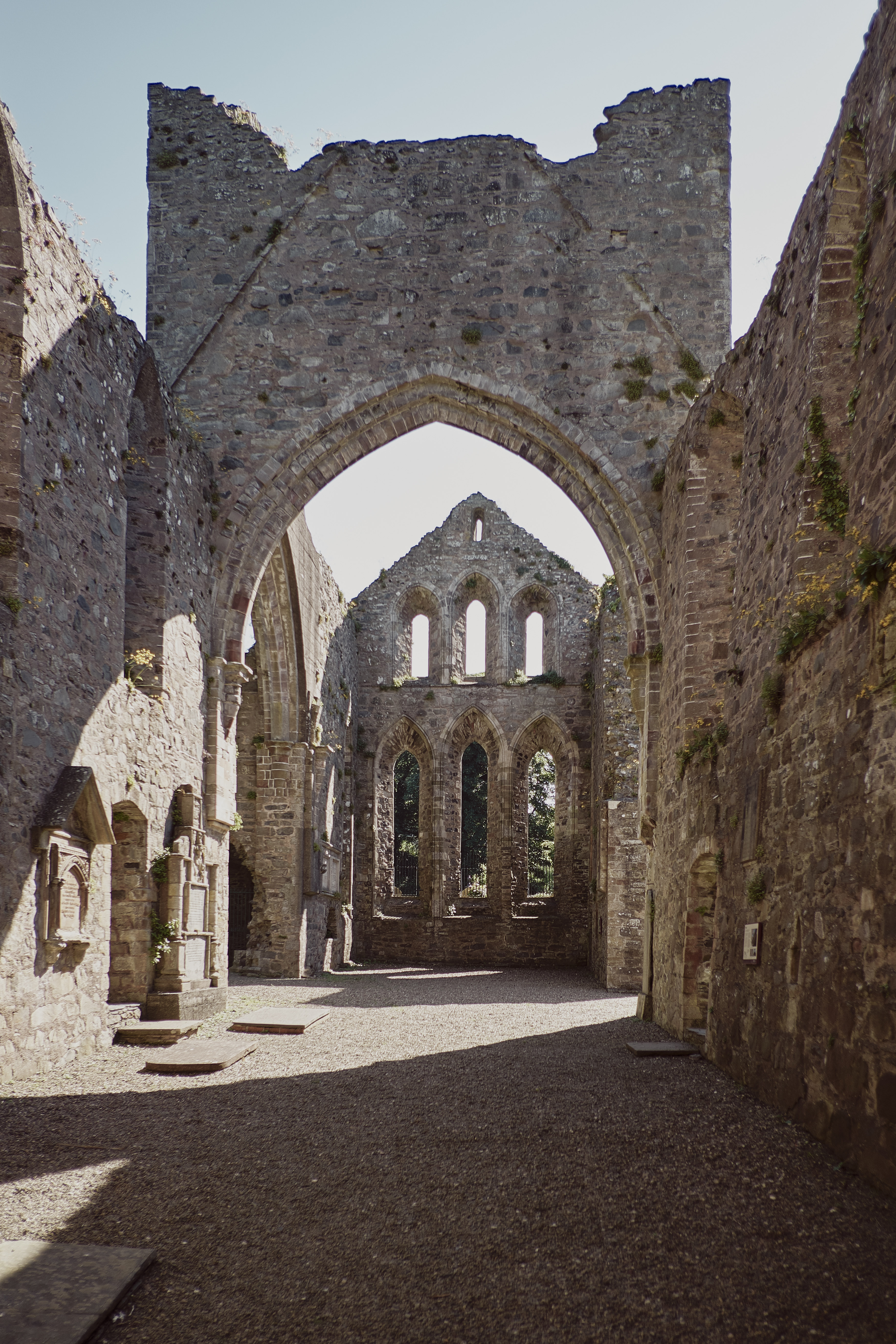
Nave, Grey Abbey, County Down, Northern Ireland
