= Dublin Annals of Inisfallen =

18th century compilation of Irish annals

The Dublin Annals of Inisfallen is a mid 18th century (c. 1765) compilation of medieval Irish annals reworked and augmented with material from later traditions in the form of interpolations, made by John O'Brien, Bishop of Cloyne and the Reverend John Conry. They are to be distinguished from the Bodleian or true Annals of Inisfallen.

A translation into Latin was published in 1825 by Charles O'Conor, but no complete English translation yet exists. Individual entries have been translated by a variety of scholars.

== Contents ==
The Dublin Annals of Inisfallen are regarded to be among the least reliable of Irish Gaelic annalistic sources, but in some entries may preserve valuable material otherwise lost. The reworked nature of the compilation makes distinguishing the valuable from the worthless very difficult.
