= Affreca de Courcy =

12th–13th century noblewoman

Affrica Guðrøðardóttir
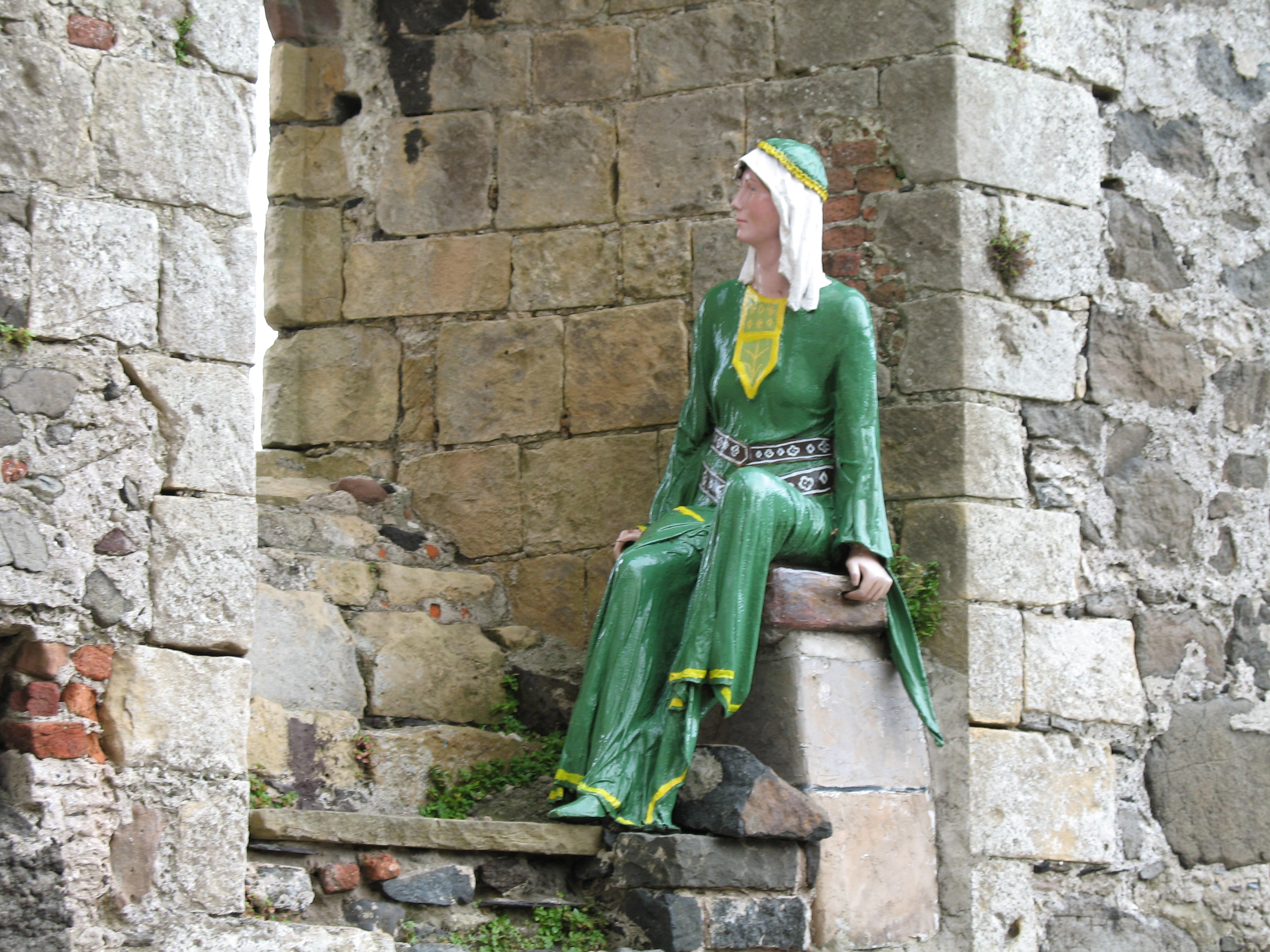
- Mannequin of Affreca at Carrickfergus Castle.
- Spouse: John de Courcy
- Dynasty: Crovan dynasty
- Father: Godred, King of the Isles

Affreca de Courcy or Affrica Guðrøðardóttir was a late 12th-/early 13th century noblewoman. She was the daughter of Godred Olafsson, King of the Isles, a member of the Crovan dynasty. In the late 12th century she married John de Courcy. Affrica is noted for religious patronage in Northern Ireland.

== Family background ==
Affreca was the daughter of Godred Olafsson (Old Norse: Guðrøðr Óláfsson, a member of the Crovan dynasty. Godred ruled the Kingdom of the Isles.

She is not to be confused with her grandmother Affrica of Galloway, Queen of Man.

== Anglo-Norman Ireland ==
A significant era in the history of Ireland was the Norman invasion of Ireland by English or Anglo-Norman adventurers in 12th century Gaelic Ireland. (Note: Secondary sources often assign anachronistic names to these incomers, such as: Anglo-French, Anglo-Norman, Cambro-Norman, and simply Norman. Contemporary Irish sources name the incomers simply as "English".) In 1166, the once powerful King of Leinster, Dermot MacMurrough (d. 1171), was forced from Ireland by his rivals. With the consent of Henry, Mac Murchada sought the aid of Henry's vassals in Wales and England. Through his daughter Aoife MacMurrough (fl. 1189), Mac Murchada gained a matrimonial-alliance with the powerful Richard de Clare, 2nd Earl of Pembroke (d. 1176). In 1167, the reinforced Mac Murchada made his return and easily regained Leinster, and later gained further lands. One of the wealthiest and coveted settlements in 12th century Ireland was Dublin, a seaport and seat of a somewhat independent kingdom ruled by various Norse-Gaelic kings. In September 1170, the forces of Mac Murchada and de Clare marched on Dublin, which was then successfully stormed by de Clare's men. According to the near contemporary Expugnatio Hibernica by Gerald of Wales (d. 1220x23), the leadership of the Dubliners managed to escape the carnage with their belongings, and sailed away into the Isles.

While many of the Dubliners may never have returned, Gerald's account and a mediaeval French text popularly known as The Song of Dermot and the Earl state that, about six months later, the deposed King of Dublin, Ascall mac Ragnaill (d. 1171), launched a sea-borne assault on the town with a force that numbered either sixty or one hundred ships respectively. Although Mac Turcaill's men successfully made landfall near the town, the sources indicate that his forces were utterly crushed by the Norman defenders, and that he was himself captured and beheaded. The French text specifically states that there was Manx involvement in the assault. In Gerald's version of the events, Affreca's father supplied thirty ships to an unsuccessful later-attempt at ousting the Normans from Dublin. In the words of Gerald, "their fear of the threat of English domination, inspired by the successes of the English, made the men of the isles act all the more quickly, and with the wind in the northwest they immediately sailed about thirty ships full of warriors into the harbour of the Liffey".

With the conquest of Norse-Gaelic Dublin, and the ongoing entrenchment of the English in Ireland, the Crovan dynasty found themselves surrounded by a potentially threatening, rising power in the Irish Sea zone. The dynasty did not take long to realign itself with this new power, in the form of a dynastic marriage between Affreca and one of the most powerful of the incoming Englishmen—John de Courcy (d. c. 1219).

== Marriage to de Courcy ==
Nothing is known of de Courcy's early life. He arrived in Ireland in 1176, with Henry's deputy in Ireland, William fitz Audelin (d. before 1198), and was a member of the English garrison of Dublin. According to the Gerald, de Courcy led an invasion of Ulaid in 1177 (an area roughly encompassing what is today County Antrim and County Down). He reached Down (modern day Downpatrick), drove off Ruaidrí Mac Duinn Sléibe, King of Ulaid (d. 1201), and consolidated his conquest of the area with the erection of a castle. He thereafter ruled his lands with a certain amount of independence for about a quarter of a century. According to the Dublin Annals of Inisfallen, the marriage between Affreca and de Courcy took place in 1180. Although scholars consider these annals particularly unreliable, a date of about 1180 may not be far off the mark, considering the time-frame of de Courcy's rapid rise to power. It is possible that de Courcy's marriage could have attributed to his success in Ulaid, considering the military resources of the Crovan dynasty. Less speculative is the likelihood that de Courcy's success was used by the Crovan dynasty, who were allied by marriage with Cenél nEógain, as a means of settling old scores.

== John and Rǫgnvaldr ==
In a series of conflicts between 1201 and 1204, de Courcy finally fell from power. By 1205 he was forced from Ireland altogether, and his lands were awarded to Hugh de Lacy, 1st Earl of Ulster (d. 1242). Sometime in 1205, de Courcy rose in rebellion, and gained military support from Affreca's brother, Ragnvald Godredsson (Old Norse: Rǫgnvaldr Guðrøðarson), King of the Isles. The Chronicle of Mann specifies that de Courcy's massive force was further strengthened by Rögnvaldr with one hundred ships. Together the two laid siege to what the chronicle describes as "the castle of Rath", before being beaten back with the arrival of Walter de Lacy (d. 1241), Hugh's elder brother. The expedition is also recorded in the Annals of Loch Cé, which state that de Courcy brought a fleet from the Isles to battle the de Lacys. Although the expedition ultimately proved a failure, the annals note that the surrounding countryside was plundered and destroyed by the invaders. The identity of the castle noted by the chronicle is almost certainly Dundrum Castle, which was possibly constructed by de Courcy before 1203. The defeat of 1205 marks the downfall of de Courcy, who never regained his Irish-lands.

== Religious patronage ==
Affreca founded in 1193 Grey Abbey, in the peninsula of Ards, where John had previously given lands to his family priory, St Andrew of Stogursey.

== Ancestry ==
Ancestors of Affreca de Courcy

8. Guðrøðr "Crovan" (d. 1095) (Note: Guðrøðr's ancestry is uncertain, although he very well may have been an Uí Ímair dynast. The epithet "crovan" is likely a Latinised form of a Gaelic or Norse epithet, and may refer to a deformity of the hands.); King of the Isles, King of Dublin
4. Óláfr Guðrøðarson (d. 1153); King of the Isles
2. Guðrøðr Óláfsson (d. 1187); King of the Isles, King of Dublin
10. Fergus (d. 1161) (Note: Fergus's ancestry is uncertain.); Lord of Galloway
5. Affraic (Note: Óláfr Guðrøðarson (d. 1153) is known to have had at least two wives: Ingibjörg Hákonardóttir and Affraic ingen Fergusa. Ingibjörg was a daughter of Hákon Pálsson, Earl of Orkney (d. c. 1126). Affraic was a daughter of Fergus, Lord of Galloway (d. 1161). Guðrøðr's mother was most likely Affraic.)
22. Henry I (d. 1135) (Note: Henry was the son of William I, King of England, Duke of Normandy (d. 1087), and his wife Matilda (d. 1083), daughter of Baudouin V, Count of Flanders (d. 1067).); King of England, Duke of Normandy
11. [unnamed] (Note: Affraic's mother was an unnamed illegitimate daughter of Henry I, King of England (d. 1135).)
1. Affrica Guðrøðardóttir (d. in or after 1219)
