= John Gallda MacDougall =

Mediaeval Scottish magnate

- Lord of Lorne
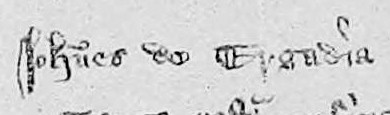
- John Gallda's name as recorded by a charter granted in 1339: "Johannes de Ergadia".
- Died: 1371×1377
- Noble family: MacDougall
- Spouse: Johanna Isaac
- Father: Allan MacDougall of Argyll

John Gallda MacDougall, Lord of Lorne (died 1371–1377), also known as John MacDougall, and John Macdougall, and in Gaelic as Eoin MacDubhghaill, Eoin Gallda MacDubhghaill, Eòin Gallda MacDubhghaill, and Eóin Gallda Mac Dubhghaill, was a fourteenth-century Scottish magnate. He was a grandson of John MacDougall, Lord of Argyll, a man who had been forced from Scotland into exile in the first third of the century. It was under John Gallda that the MacDougall leadership made its resurgence in Scotland after generations of English exile.

By the mid century, John Gallda was married to Johanna Isaac, a niece of David II, King of Scotland, and restored to a portion of the MacDougalls' originally holdings in Argyll. The favours bestowed upon the MacDougalls by the Scottish Crown appear to have been a tactic to keep in check nearby magnates, such as John MacDonald, Lord of the Isles, a man who headed the MacDougalls' regional rivals, the MacDonalds. Although John Galla enjoyed close ties to the Bruce regime, with the subsequent accession of Robert II, King of Scotland, and the start of the Stewart regime, the MacDougalls quickly fell from favour. John Gallda was the last MacDougall to hold the lordship of Lorne. He and Johanna had two legitimate daughters through which the lordship passed, whilst the leadership of MacDougalls passed to an illegitimate son.

== Familial background ==
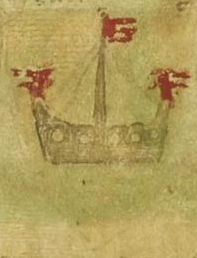
Coat of arms of the Lord of Argyll as it appears in the fourteenth-century Balliol Roll. It corresponds to the seal of John Gallda's great-grandfather, Alexander MacDougall, Lord of Argyll. (Note: The coat of arms is blazoned: or, a galley sable with dragon heads at prow and stern and flag flying gules, charged on the hull with four portholes argent. It is the only painted example of a coat of arms borne by the MacDougall Lords of Lorne. Whilst in the service of the English in 1319, John Gallda's father, Allan MacDougall of Argyll, bore a galley on his seals.)

John Gallda was a son of Allan MacDougall of Argyll (fl. 1319), who was in turn a son of John MacDougall, Lord of Argyll (died 1316). The epithet gallda can be taken to mean "the foreigner", "Anglicised", or "Lowlandised". Gallda was not an unheard of epithet, and was apparently accorded to people who were fluent in the Scots or English languages, or to people who had spent time in either England, or non-Gaelic speaking areas of Scotland.

John Gallda's aforesaid grandfather, John MacDougall, had been closely connected with the Comyns, and therefore had been a constant opponent of Robert I, King of Scotland, and an ally of the latter's English counterparts, Edward I, King of England and Edward II, King of England. Following his defeat to Robert I at the Battle of the Pass of Brander, John MacDougall fled to England where he spent the remainder of his life in the service of the English Crown. He left at least two sons and two daughters. Both of his sons, Ewen and the aforesaid Allan MacDougall of Argyll, were members of Edward II's royal household. (Note: As a successor to John MacDougall, Ewen is also noted by the fifteenth-century chronicler Andrew Wyntoun (died c. 1422). According to later tradition, John MacDougall had two additional sons: Somhairle and Alexander Og. There is also a record of a certain "Ivo de Ergadia".)

After his death in 1329, Robert I was succeeded by his young son, David II, King of Scotland (died 1371). The kingdom soon came under the attack of Edward Balliol (died 1364), an English-backed claimant to the throne, and the young David II was forced to flee to France for safety. In time, English-backed Balliol regime diminished to the extent that the teenage David II was able to return to his realm in 1341. Five years later, however, David II was captured by the English in a disastrous military campaign, and held in custody before his eventual ransom in 1357. John Gallda himself was brought up in England, due to the exile of his father and grandfather, and it is likely David II's own captivity there that brought about their eventual association.

== Relocation ==
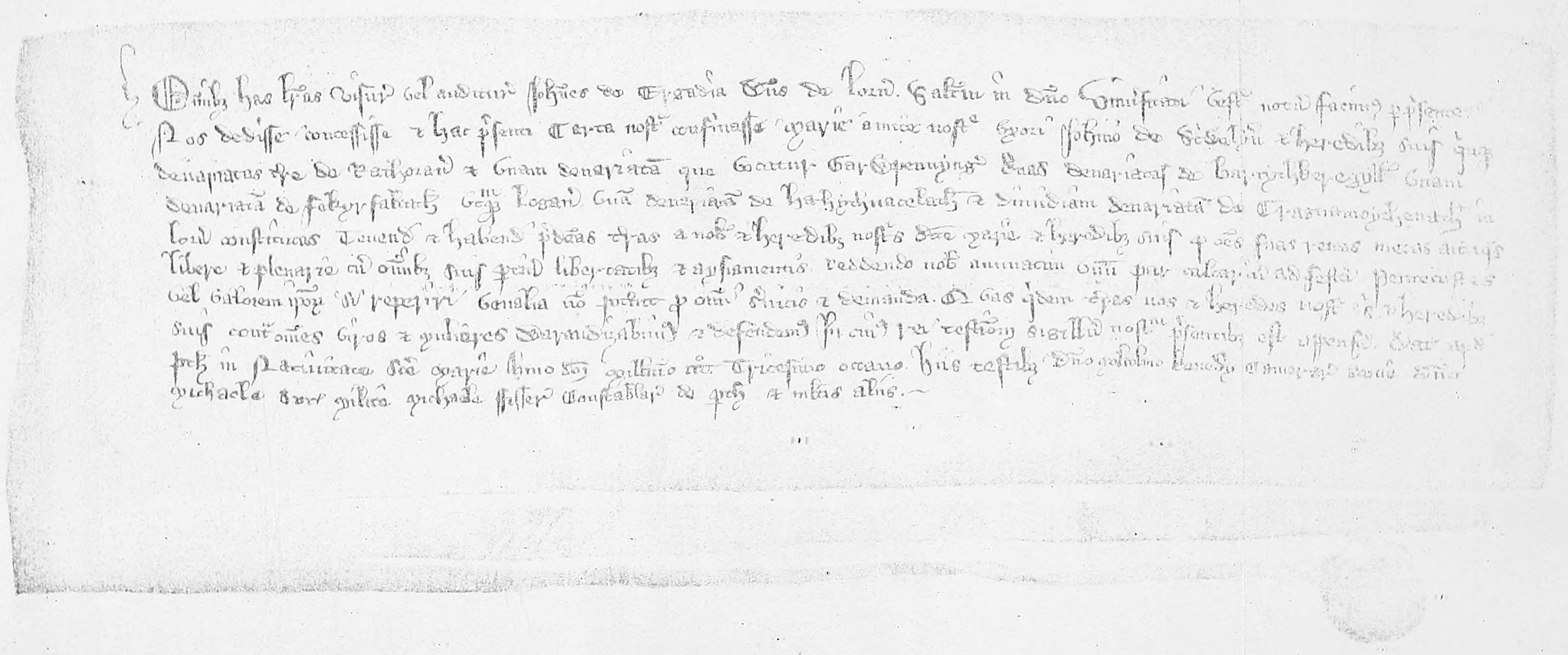
Nineteenth-century facsimile of a charter of John Gallda to his father's sister, Mary, wife of John of Stirling. John Gallda granted the charter in 1338, whilst in the service of the English, during the occupation of Perth.

John Gallda's grandfather died in 1316. The history of the MacDougalls in years immediately after his death is obscure. The ancestral lands had been forfeited by Robert I, with the dismantled lordship distributed piecemeal to supporters of the new Bruce regime, such the MacDonalds, Campbells, and MacLeans. Despite the MacDougalls' extended exile, there is evidence that the kindred managed to maintain influence in the ecclesiastical affairs of their former lands, as the Bishop of Argyll in 1342–1362 appears to have been a MacDougall. In the 1330s, during the English-backed Balliol invasions of Scotland, the MacDougalls appear to have attempted a comeback. For example, a certain Ewen, perhaps John Gallda's aforesaid uncle, was apparently active on the island of Lismore in 1334. (Note: Another possibility is that this "Ewin" represents John Gallda himself.) John Gallda is recorded in Scotland as early as 1338, when as a member of the English garrison in Perth he issued a grant of lands to his father's sister, Mary, wife of John Stirling. The following year, the Scots, under the command of Robert Stewart, Steward of Scotland (died 1390), overcame the English at Perth. John Gallda does not appear on record again until the 1350s, and it is possible that he was one of the men under Thomas Ughtred (died 1365), commander of the English forces at Perth, who were allowed to return to England following the Steward's successful siege.

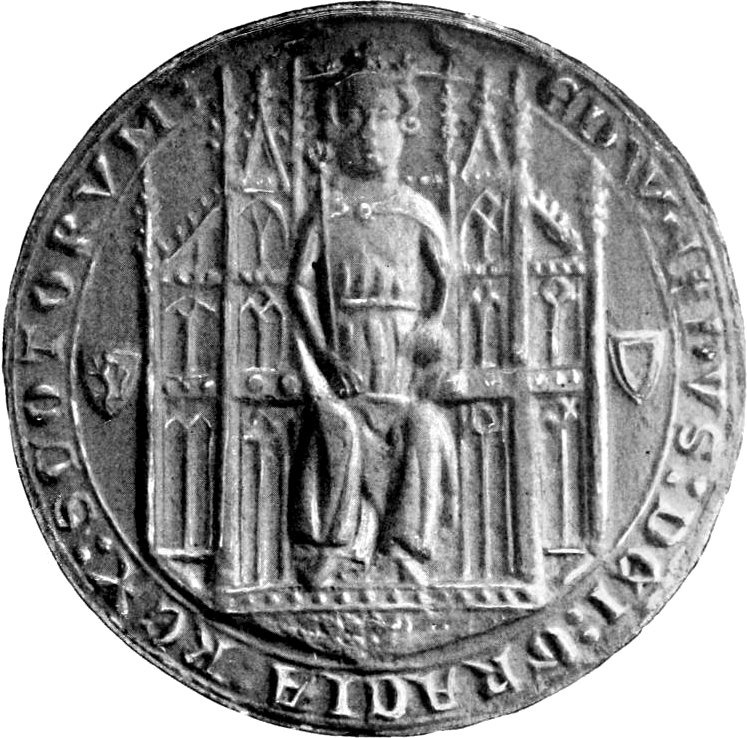
Seal of Edward Balliol as King of Scotland.

A few years earlier prior, in the mid 1330s, during the brief Balliol regime, the Hebridean magnate John MacDonald of Islay (died c. 1387) ceased to support the exiled David II, proceeded to style himself Lord of the Isles, and shifted his allegiance to Edward Balliol and the latter's English overlord. During this time, Edward Balliol rapidly granted away lands of stubborn Bruce supporters to loyal supporters of his own. In so doing, large swathes of Argyll were gifted away to the Lord of the Isles. Specifically, the islands of Colonsay, Gigha, Islay, (half of) Jura, Lewis, Mull, Skye, and the mainland territories of Ardnamurchan, Kintyre, Knapdale, and Morvern were assigned to him. These grants, therefore, included regions formerly held by the MacDougalls and MacRuairidhs, which in turn could indicate that it was understood between the Lord of the Isles and the Balliol regime that the MacDougalls were to be denied royal support in reclaiming their former lands. However, territories such as Appin, Benderloch, Lismore, and Lorne itself, were omitted from John MacDonald's grants, possibly as a result of John Gallda's aforesaid campaigning at Perth, in the service of the English-Balliol cause.

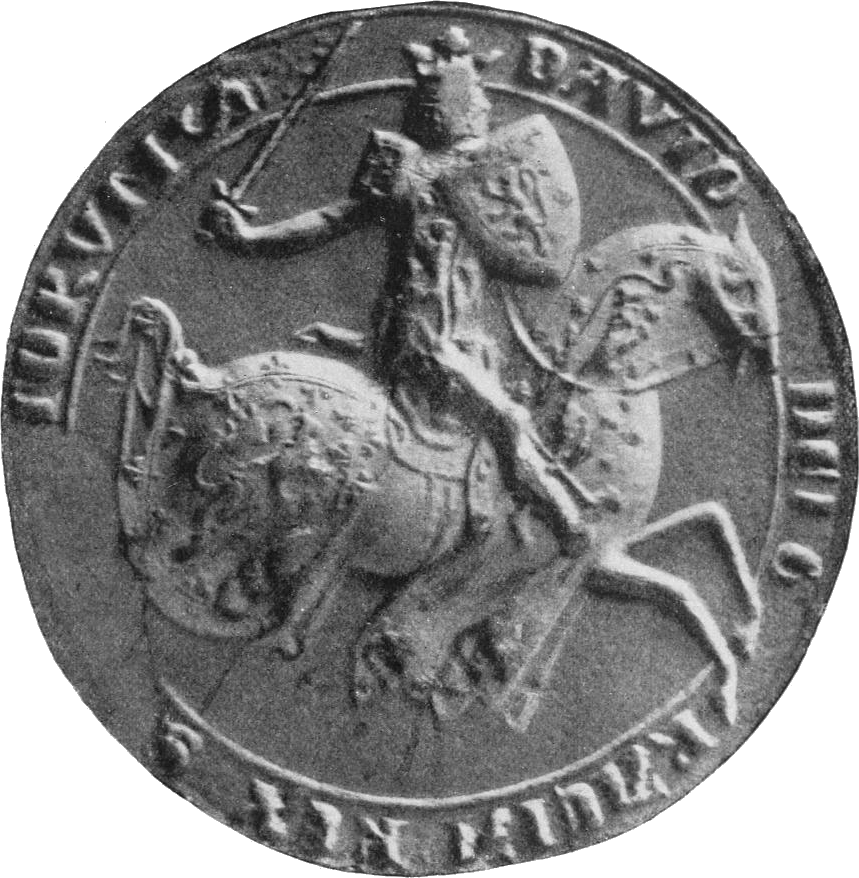
Seal of David II, King of Scotland.

It seems that John Gallda relocated to Scotland at some point in the early 1350s, for he next appears on record in 1354, when he and the aforesaid Lord of the Isles, a man who headed the MacDougalls' traditional rivals the MacDonalds, signed a bond of peace between each other. The contract made it clear that John Gallda recognised John MacDonald's dominance in the region, and also the latter's control of former MacDougall lands lost in the reign of David II's father. Additionally, the Lord of the Isles granted John Gallda the island of Coll, and part of Tiree. The fact that John Gallda was to hand over three hostages until the castle of Cairn na Burgh Mór was in John MacDonald's possession suggests that at least one of the fortresses in the contested lands was then in the hands of the MacDougalls. (Note: One of the terms in which John Gallda resigned the said rights to John MacDonald was that the castle of Cairn na Burgh Mór was not to be given into the keeping a member of the MacKinnons.) The fact that both John MacDonald and John Gallda were Balliol supporters in the 1330s could be evidence that this MacDonald-MacDougall pact, and the division of territories wherein, was based upon an understanding established during the Balliol regime. Whatever the case, a similar contract was concluded between John Gallda and Archibald Campbell, Lord of Loch Awe (died 1385×1387) the following year.

== Restoration ==
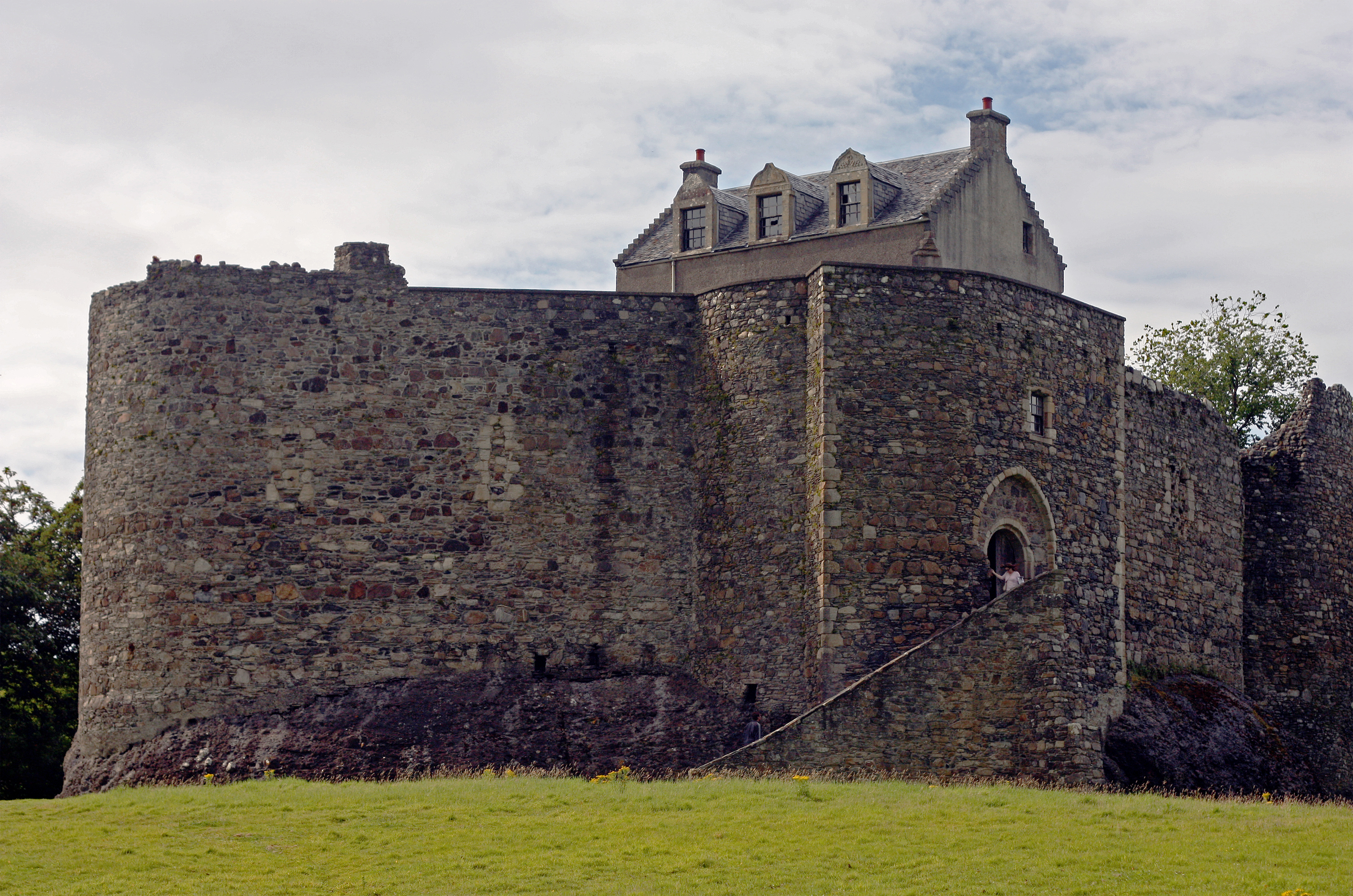
Dunstaffnage Castle, a fortress built, held, and lost by John Gallda's MacDougall predecessors appears to have been one of several castles regained by John Gallda as a consequence of the restoration of the family's former lands in Lorne.

The impetus behind the aforesaid agreements appears to have been the prospect of the MacDougalls eventual restoration in their ancestral lands. By concluding these contracts, the MacDonalds and Campbells appear to have attempted to preserve their own possession of former MacDougall territories. The prospect of a MacDougall comeback may have seemed threatening in the wake of the ongoing negotiations to secure the release of David II. The king finally secured his release in 1357, and about the following year granted John Gallda all the possessions and rents that had formerly belonged to the latter's great-grandfather, Alexander MacDougall, Lord of Argyll (died 1310). Furthermore, the king granted John Gallda certain fortresses in the possession of the Lord of the Isles, a gift that could refer to the castles outlined in the aforesaid agreement of 1354, and therefore evidencing the MacDougall's restoration on Mull and other island territories. The king's grant of 1357/1358 effectively nullified his own father's grants of Lorne and Benderloch lands to the Campbells, and overturned the aforesaid MacDonald-MacDougall pact of 1354. (Note: A few days after the king's grant to John Gallda, he granted a similar charter to Archibald, which confirmed him in the lands once held by his father. This grant effectively ruled out any MacDougall restoration in the territories of Loch Awe and Ardscotnish.)

It is apparent that John Gallda was favoured by David II. The two may well have first met in England during the king's captivity, and the king may well have been responsible for his relocation to Scotland in the early 1350s. It is almost certain that David II was also responsible for John Gallda's fortuitous marriage to Johanna Isaac, daughter of the king's own sister, Matilda Bruce. The union itself is datable to at least 1362, and resulted in the king regarding John Gallda as a nephew. (Note: The union is also noted by Gesta Annalia II, which places alongside events dating to about 1350–1352.) In theory the marriage meant that any children of the couple potentially possessed a claim in the royal succession, and may have been regarded as a threat to the leading claimant, and eventual successor, the aforesaid Robert Stewart, David II's nephew. In fact, the king elsewhere appears to have attempted to divert the royal succession on several occasions, and contemporary royal acta reveal that he bestowed much favour upon John Gallda and Johanna.

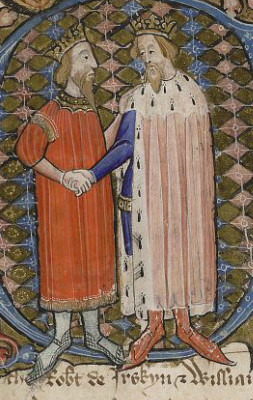
David II (left) and Edward III, King of England (right) as pictured in the fourteenth-century British Library Cotton MS Nero D VI.

John Gallda's royal support and relocation appears to have been due to the fact that David II regarded him as a potential ally against the machinations of the aforesaid Robert Stewart, and the latter's western confederates. By the end of the 1350s, John MacDonald, one such confederate, was not only an ally to Edward Balliol, and Edward III, but allied in marriage to the Steward besides. As for John Gallda, however, he had no links with the Steward, and the Scottish Crown may have consequently considered the MacDougall as a reliable means to fill the western power vacuum created by the murder of Ranald MacRuairi (died 1346). John MacDonald's alignment with the king's adversaries at this point suggests that the castles referred to in John Gallda's aforesaid royal charter may have included the island fortresses outlined in the MacDonald-MacDougall pact of 1354. Although John Galla's restoration allowed the MacDougalls to regain a foothold in their traditional lands, the phenomenal power possessed by their predecessors was never regained. Originally in his pact with John MacDonald, John Gallda styled himself "of Argyll", perhaps in imitation of his powerful predecessors. Afterwards, he used the style "of Lorn", seemingly in acceptance of his family's restricted place in society. (Note: The fact that John Gallda's like-named grandfather was styled "of Lorne" by John Barbour, a style not corroborated by contemporary sources, suggests that the fourteenth-century historian telescoped John Gallda's anachronistic style to his grandfather. Likewise, the Gaelic epithet bacach ("the lame") commonly attributed to John MacDougall first appears in the seventeenth century, and appears to resulted in confusion with another MacDougall.) The fact that he was able to succeed in Argyll at all, after almost a forty years of his family's absence, reveals not only the strength of family-loyalties, but also the apparent resentment of MacDonald encroachment and overlordship. (Note: The power the MacDougalls possessed in Argyll before their restoration may be apparent in the dispute over the election of the aforesaid bishop, Martin of Argyll. The latter, a possible MacDougall himself, enjoyed the support of the English-backed Balliol regime, whilst his ecclesiastical opponent, Angus of Argyll, had the support of the Bruce regime.)

In 1355, John Gallda concluded a bond of protection to Gilbert, Lord of Glassary who was locked in dispute with the Campbells of Ardscotnish. The possibility that the father of John Campbell, Lord of Ardscotnish had received a grant of former MacDougall territories in the reign of Robert I may explain the MacDougall's interest in the dispute. By the end of the 1350s, the borders of the MacDougall and Campbell lands appears to have been amicably settled, and the families bound themselves together through the marriage of Archibald's son and successor to an apparent kinswoman of John Gallda.

== Alienation ==
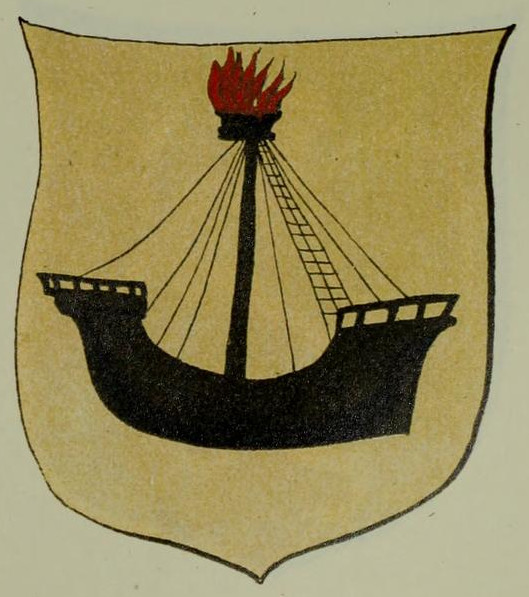
Facsimile of the coat of arms of "Ye lord of lorn of auld" that appears in the sixteenth-century Sir David Lindsay's Armorial.

Although the MacDougalls clearly had the support of the kingdom in the wake of John Gallda's return and consolidation of core territories, by the 1360s the relationship appears to have soured somewhat. Unlike Robert I, who had lent personal support to his western allies, David II left the MacDougalls to deal with the surrounding MacDonalds themselves. In 1365, John Gallda was remarkably one of fifteen magnates and clerics summoned by the Scottish Crown to work out a peace deal with the English. John Gallda's presence there, as with that of Archibald Campbell of Loch Awe, may be explained by the fact that one of the proposed concessions to the English was to make west-coast Scots liable to be drafted into English military service in Ireland. From the point of view of the Scottish Crown, such a concession may have been intended to deal with troublesome western magnates.

In 1366, the parliament attempted to tackle the ongoing issue of widespread violence across the realm. John Gallda and John MacDonald were two magnates noted for being "contumaciously absent". Certainly the MacDougalls and MacDonalds were long-time rivals, however the absence of the two men may well have been due to the prospect of the aforesaid military service, or by the reassessment of their taxes that year, for it was later recorded that John Gallda had refused to allow royal officials review his Argyllshire lands. John Gallda was again called to parliament in 1369. As with the aforesaid assembly, the violence and tax avoidance in the Highlands and Islands appears to have been the main point of business, and one of the magnates singled out for oaths of obedience was John Gallda himself.

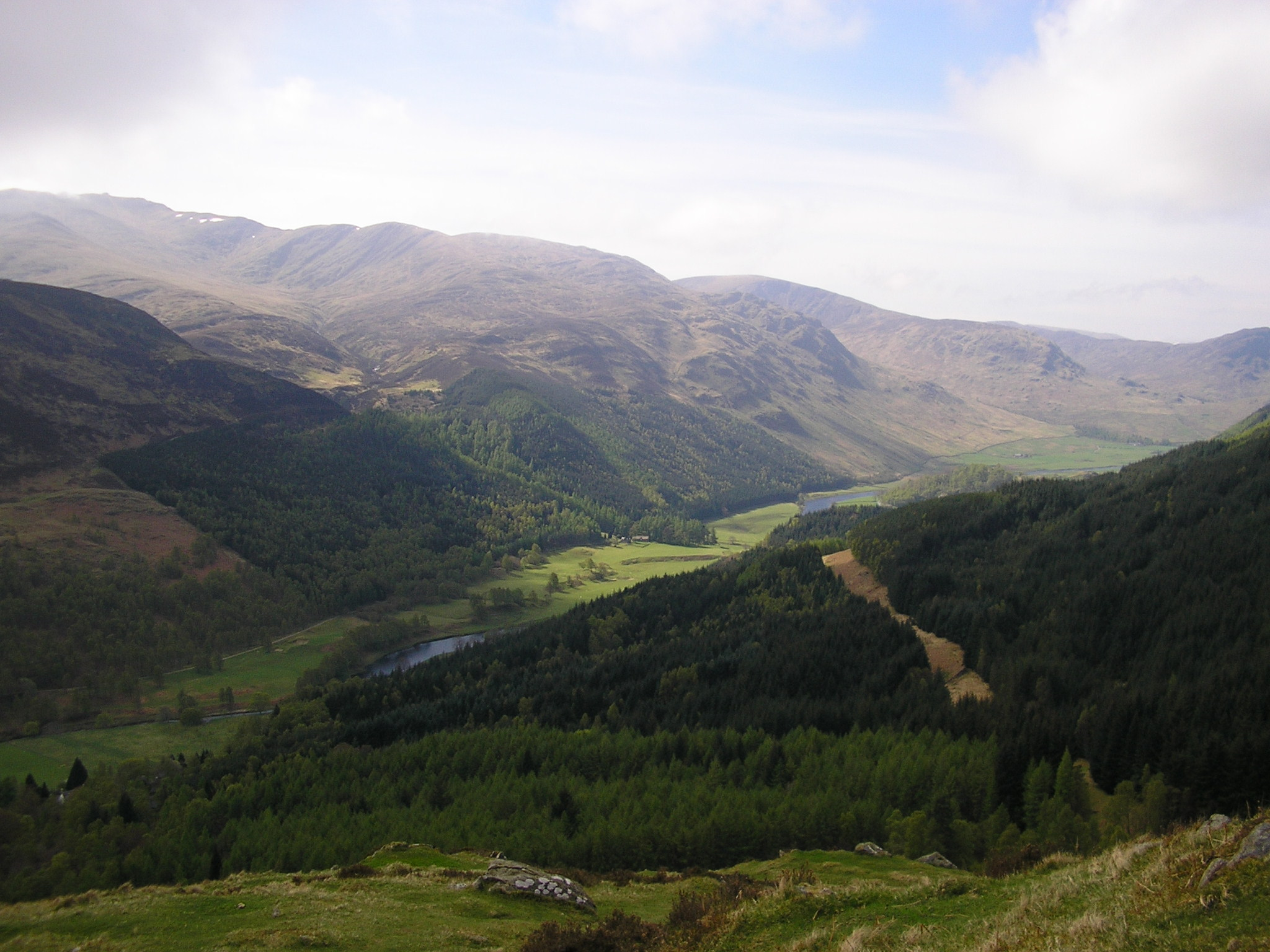
View of Glen Lyon, granted to John Gallda in 1369.

In the aftermath of the 1369 parliament, the Scottish Crown gifted the expansive lordship of Glen Lyon to John Gallda. He further received the bailliary of Appin of Dull. These endowments may well have been an attempt by the Scottish Crown to win back the support of John Gallda as a means to counter the latter's powerful neighbours, the aforesaid Steward, Earl of Ross, and Lord of the Isles. At about this time, David II appears to have attempted the same thing with the aforesaid Lord of Loch Awe.

== Death and descendants ==
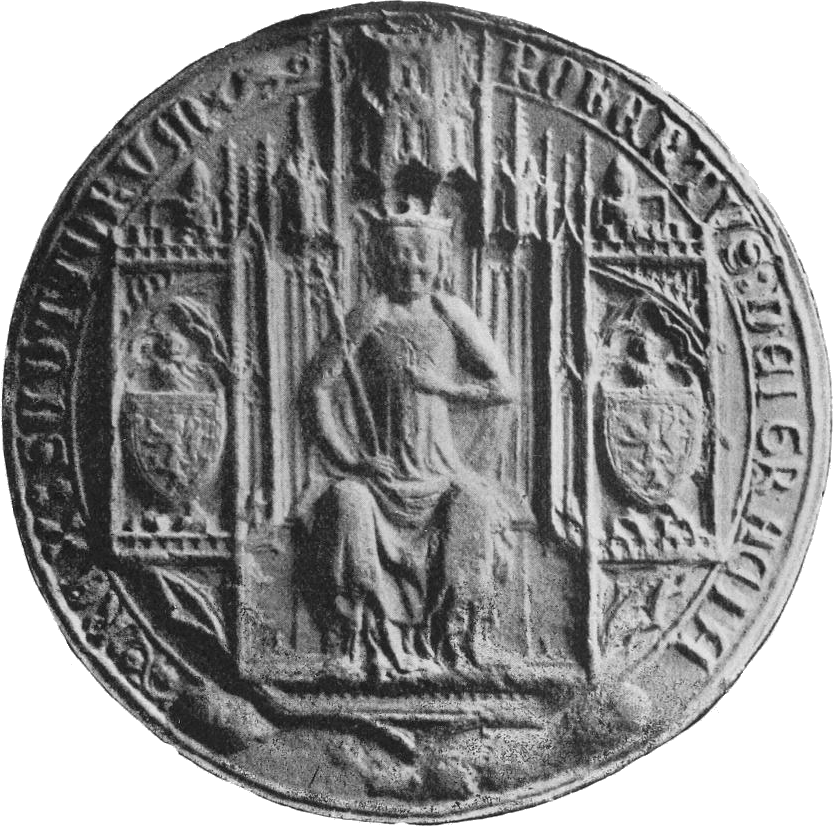
Seal of Robert II, King of Scotland.

David II died in 1371, and was succeeded by the now fifty-four year-old Steward (as Robert II). In an instant the latter's allies and followers became "king's men"; and whilst these men may well have regarded their futures as promising, the futures of those who had been adversaries of the Steward may have seemed bleak in comparison. Clearly John Gallda's close connection with David II, and his wife's royal Bruce ancestry, would have done little to endear the MacDougalls to the newly inaugurated Stewart monarch. Unsurprisingly, whilst Archibald Campbell was present at Robert II's royal coronation, John Gallda was notably absent. In fact, Robert II quickly revoked the aforesaid lands and positions in Perthshire that John Galla had received from David II, and subsequently gifted them to his own sons. The animosity directed at the MacDougalls by the new Stewart regime may well be perceptible in the harsh depiction of John Gallda's aforesaid grandfather in The Bruce, an epic poem composed for the Stewart royal court by John Barbour (died 1395). One of the sub-themes of The Bruce is a bitter feud between Robert I and John MacDougall, a motif which appears to harken to the uneasy relations between Robert II and John Gallda. (Note: The enmity directly at John MacDougall by Barbour appears to have led the latter to misidentify the former with Robert I's opponent at the Battle of Dalry fought in 1306, and an imprisoned opponent who died at Dumbarton.) In a similar way, the positive roles of the ancestors of John MacDonald and Archibald Campbell are seemingly inflated, and greatly influenced by the political realities of the late fourteenth century Stewart regime.

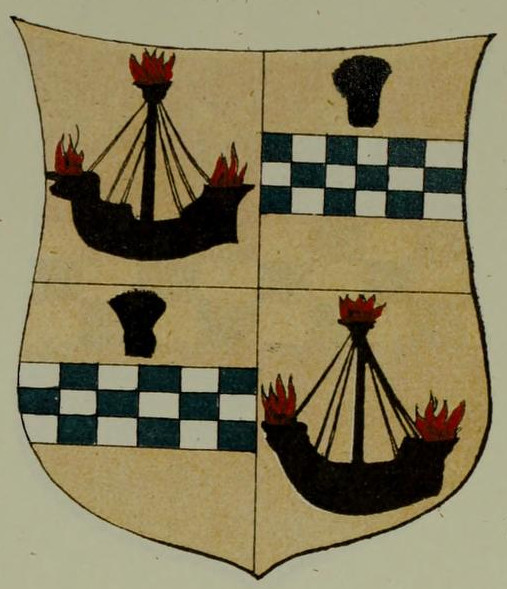
Image a

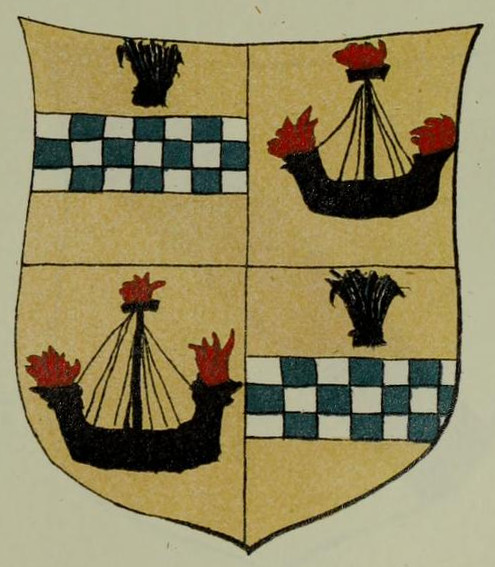
Image b

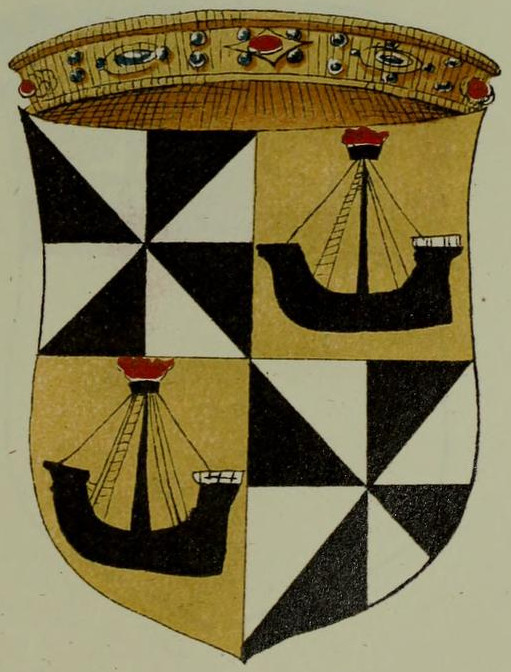
Image c

Facsimiles of the coats of arms of "steuert Lord of Lorne" (image a), "Stewart lord of Innermeith" (image b), and "Campbell erle of argyll" (image c) appearing in Sir David Lindsay's Armorial. The galleys that appear in the Stewart coats of arms are derived from the MacDougall lordship. The galley was adopted by the Campbells when they later acquired the lordship from the Stewarts.

John Gallda died between 1371×1377. Although the MacDougalls had clearly been out of favour of the king, the ultimate failure of the family was John Gallda's inability to produce a legitimate male heir to succeed him in the lordship. According to Gesta Annalia II, John Gallda and Johanna indeed had a son, or sons, but they certainly never succeeded their father, and evidently died young. What is certain, however, is that the couple had two daughters: Isabel (died 1439) and Janet. At an uncertain date, Isabel married John Stewart of Innermeath (died 1421), whilst Janet married John Stewart's brother, Robert Stewart of Durisdeer (died 1403). The brothers were members of the Stewarts of Innermeath, a cadet branch of the Stewart family, and by 1388 they brought forth claims to the lordship of Lorne through their wives. Eventually the lordship passed to Isabel's husband, and this couple's descendants. According to Gesta Annalia II, after John Gallda's death Johanna married Malcolm Fleming of Biggar, a union which appears to be corroborated by a papal dispensation granted in 1377. In consequence of the marriages of John Gallda's daughters and widow, Robert II oversaw the neutralisation of potentially threatening competing claims to the royal succession.

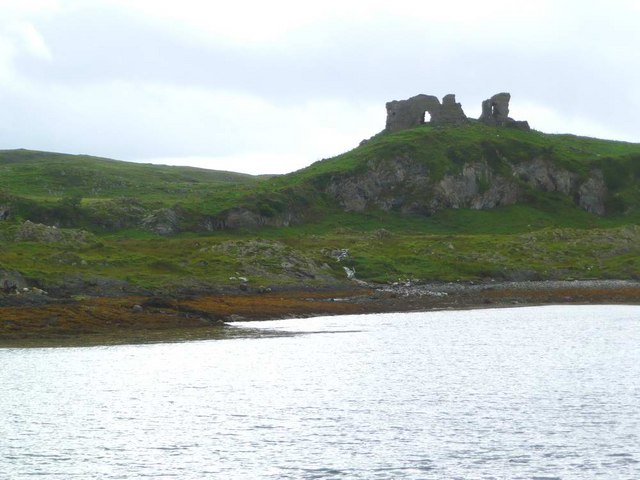
Ruinous Achanduin Castle, on the island of Lismore, was built by John Gallda's MacDougall predecessors. There is reason to suspect that it remained in the hands of the family throughout the fourteenth century. (Note: The aforesaid record of John Gallda's uncle in Argyll early in the fourteenth specifically locates him at the castle.)

With the demise of the Lord of Lorn, the leadership of the MacDougalls appears to have fallen to Allan MacDougall, John Gallda's apparently illegitimate son, and ancestor of later MacDougalls of Dunollie. (Note: The ancestry of the MacDougall chiefship is often outlined incorrectly. For example, the chiefship is sometimes erroneously stated to descend from a brother of the aforesaid Alexander MacDougall (John Gallda's great-grandfather) named Duncan. John's parentage is confirmed in a particular writ revealing that, in 1371, Mariota, relict of John Barron, pledged her lands to John Gallda for a mortgage of £40. The latter's name in this transaction is rendered: "Johanni Alano Dno de Loorn".) The Stewarts of Innermeath were not the only family to lay claim to MacDougall possessions. One such family were the MacArthur Campbells of Strachur, who assigned their own claims to certain former MacDougall territories in Lorne to Duncan, Earl of Lennox (died 1425), a son-in-law of the aforesaid Lord of Loch Awe. This formidable Campbell-Lennox pact would have likely been regarded as a perilous threat to both the MacDougalls and Stewarts who claimed to be the rightful heirs of John Gallda. At its height, the coalition appears to have included (Robert II's son) Robert Stewart, Earl of Fife and Menteith (died 1420) and Alexander MacDonald, Lord of Lochaber. In time, however, the Stewarts of Innermeath successfully consolidated their own control in the region, and appear to have come to terms with Allan, whose grandson, John Ciar MacDougall of Dunollie, held considerable possessions and positions under their new Stewart overlords.

== Ancestry ==
Ancestors of John Gallda MacDougall

16. Ewen MacDougall, King of the Isles and Lord of Argyll
8. Alexander MacDougall, Lord of Argyll (died 1310)
4. John MacDougall, Lord of Argyll (died 1316)
18. John Comyn I, Lord of Badenoch and Lochaber
9. unknown (Note: The name of Alexander's wife is unknown, although she was almost certainly a member of the Comyns, and likely a daughter of John Comyn I, Lord of Badenoch and Lochaber. The seal of John Gallda's father is charged with garbs, the heraldic emblem of the Comyns.)
2. Allan MacDougall of Argyll
1. John Gallda MacDougall, Lord of Lorne (died 1371×1377)
