= Dunollie Castle =

Small ruined castle on the west coast of Scotland in Argyll and Bute

- Caisteal Dhùn Ollaigh (Scottish Gaelic)
- Oban, Argyll and Bute
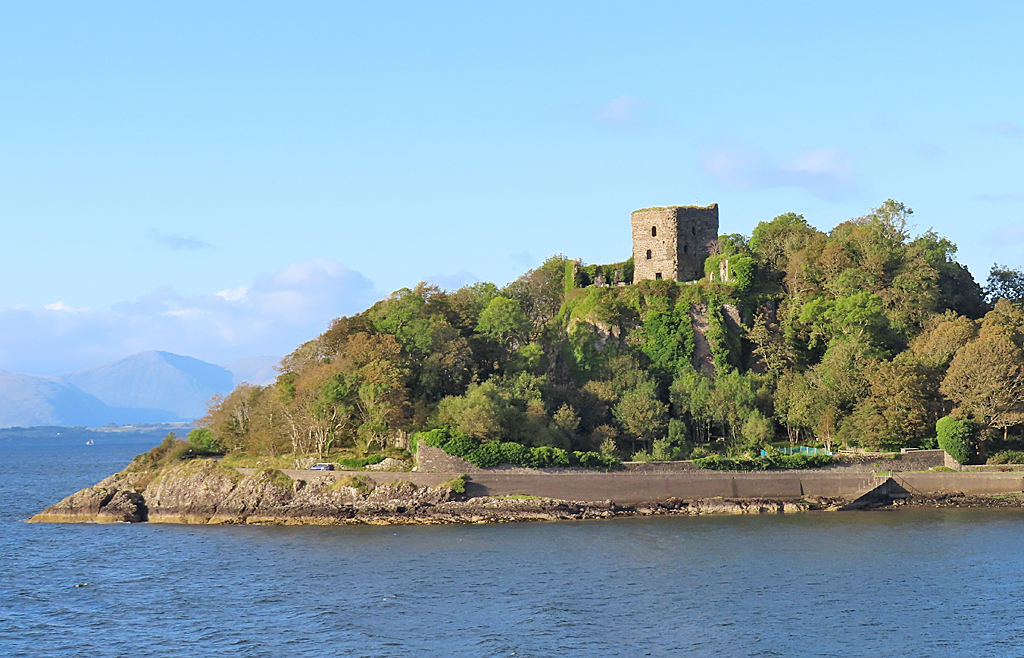
- The castle in 2024

Site information
- Type: Castle
- Website: https://www.dunollie.org/

Location
- Coordinates: 56°25′35″N 5°29′5″W

Dunollie Castle (Scottish Gaelic: Caisteal Dhùn Ollaigh) is a small ruined castle located on a hill north of the town of Oban, on the west coast of Scotland in Argyll and Bute. The site enjoys views over towards the island of Kerrera and a view of the town, harbour, and outlying isles. The castle is open to the public as part of the Dunollie Museum, Castle and Grounds.

== History ==
There was a fortification on this high promontory in the early Middle Ages, when Dunollie was the royal centre of the Cenél Loairn within the kingdom of Dál Riata. The Irish annals record that "Dun Ollaigh" was attacked or burned down three times, in 686, 698, and in 701. It was subsequently rebuilt in 714 by Selbach mac Ferchair (died 730), the King of Dál Riata credited with destroying the site in 701. Excavations in the 1970s suggest that this early fortification was abandoned some time in the 10th century.

The area around Dunollie subsequently became part of the semi-independent Kingdom of the Isles, ruled over by Somerled in the 12th century. On his death, the MacDougalls became Lords of Lorne. Dougall, Somerled's son, held most of Argyll and also the islands of Mull, Lismore, Jura, Tiree, Coll and many others in the 12th century.

Excavations show that Dunollie was refortified with an earthwork castle in the 13th century or potentially the late 12th century. The builder may have been Dougall, or his son Duncan. Ewan MacDougall, great-grandson of Somerled and the third chief of the MacDougalls, switched the clan's allegiance in the mid 13th century: initially allied with Haakon IV of Norway, from the 1250s Ewan remained loyal to the kings of Scotland.

In the 14th century, Ewan's grandson John MacDougall, along with his kinsmen the Comyns, sided with the Balliols against the interests of Robert the Bruce. John MacDougall's army defeated the Bruce at the Battle of Dalrigh in 1306, but Bruce returned in 1308 and crushed the MacDougalls at the Battle of the Pass of Brander. The MacDougall lands of Lorne were subsequently forfeit and were given to the Campbells, though Dunollie and other estates were regained later in the 14th century.

The existing castle ruins date largely from the 15th century.

The Marquis of Argyll captured the castle in 1644, but it was returned to the MacDougalls in 1661. In 1746, the MacDougalls abandoned Dunollie Castle and built Dunollie House just downhill from the castle ruins.

In recent years, a charitable trust was formed titled The MacDougall of Dunollie Preservation Trust, who are responsible for the care of the historic buildings and collections held in this an ancestral site. Today, the Dunollie Preservation Trust operates Dunollie Museum, Castle & Grounds - a visitor attractions and social enterprise. Through the running of this organisation, all funds raised contribute to ongoing conservation and development efforts as well as education and learning. Remains of a historical herb garden have recently been discovered in the castle grounds.

== Gallery ==
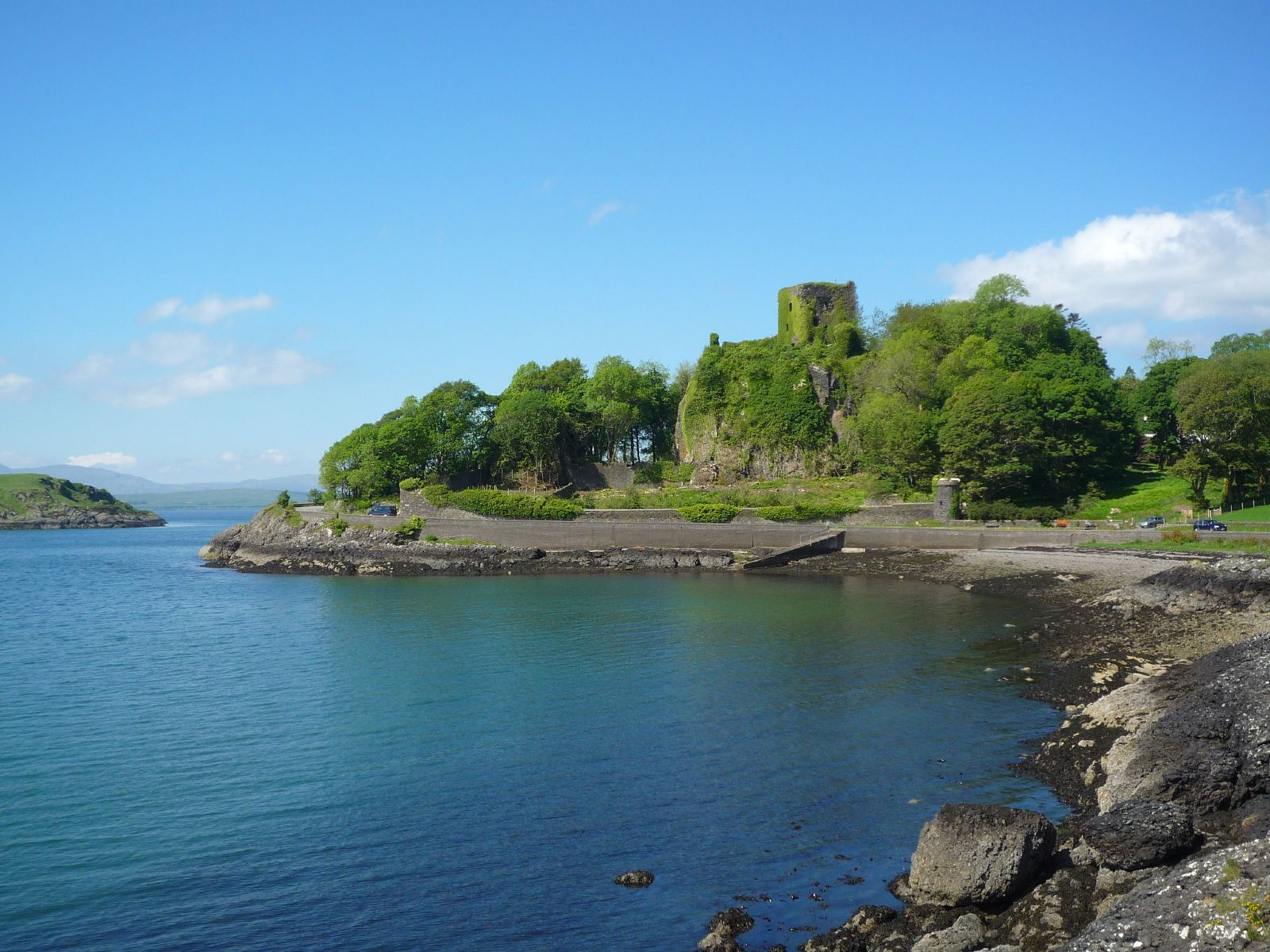
Dunollie Castle

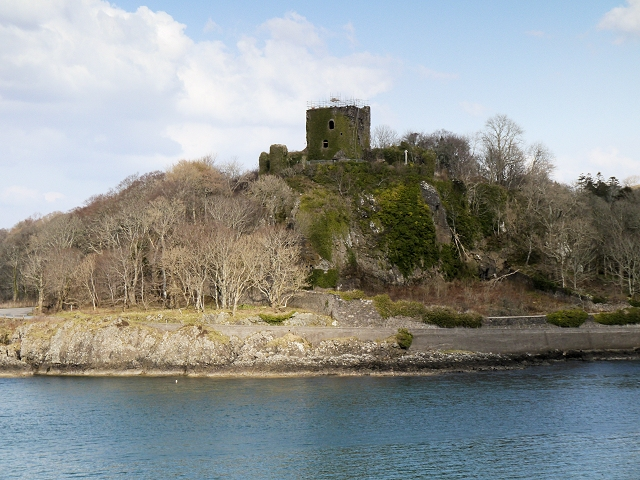
Oban, Dunollie Castle

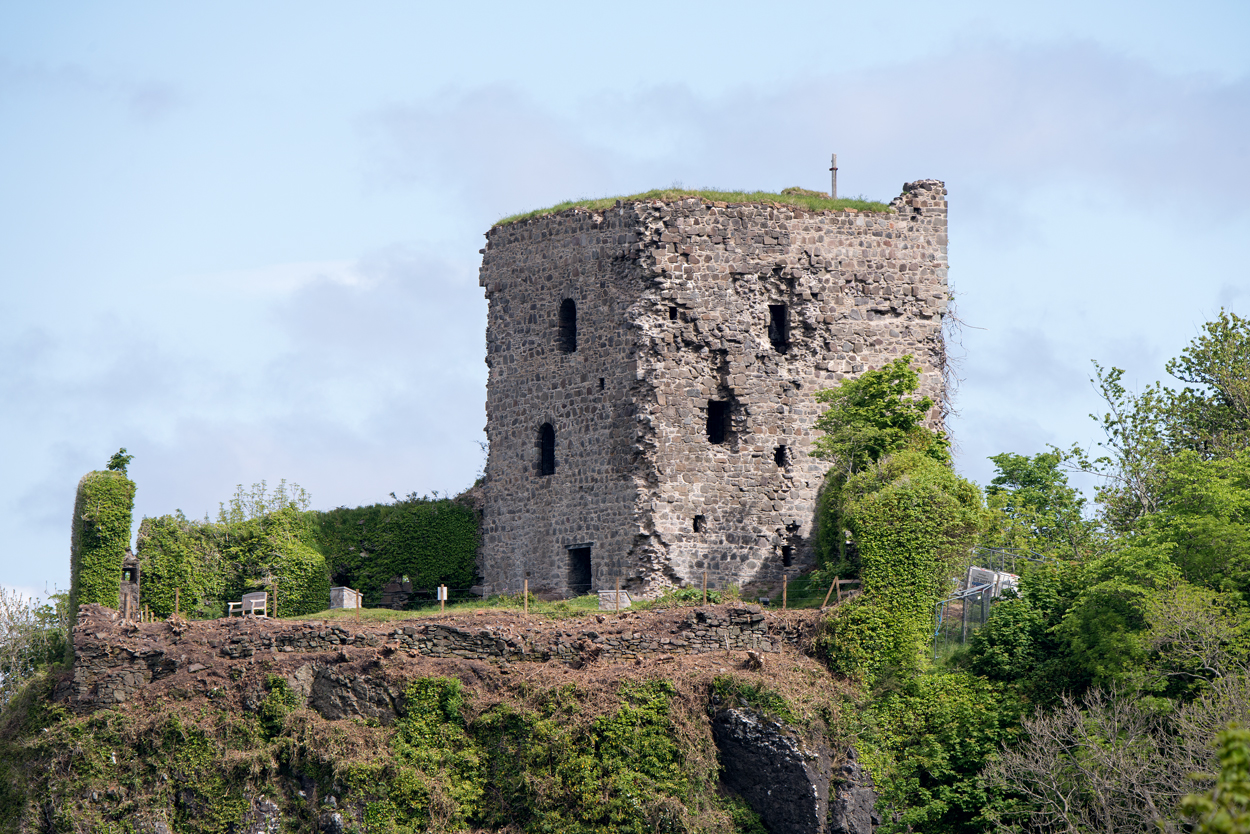
Dunollie Castle - May 2016

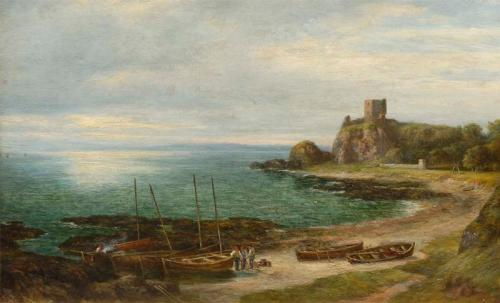
Dunollie Castle - painting by Sir George Reid

== See also ==
- Royalist rising of 1651 to 1654
- Dunstaffnage Castle

== Sources ==
- Alcock, Leslie; Alcock, Elizabeth A (1987). "Reconnaissance excavations on early historic fortifications and other royal sites in Scotland, 1974-84: 2, Excavations at Dunollie Castle, Oban, Argyll, 1978" (PDF). Proceedings of the Society of Antiquaries of Scotland. 117: 119–147.
