= Brooch of Lorn =

Medieval Scottish brooch

The Brooch of Lorn or Braìste Lathurna in Gaelic, is a medieval "turreted" disk brooch supposedly taken from Robert the Bruce (Robert I of Scotland) at the Battle of Dalrigh in 1306. However it is today dated long after this period.

The brooch is centred on a large quartz charmstone, and it is not implausible that this stone had belonged to the Bruce; it also acted as a reliquary. It is owned by the MacDougall of Dunollie Preservation Trust. It was rarely seen in public until it was loaned to an exhibition in the British Museum in London in 2012.

== Description and context ==
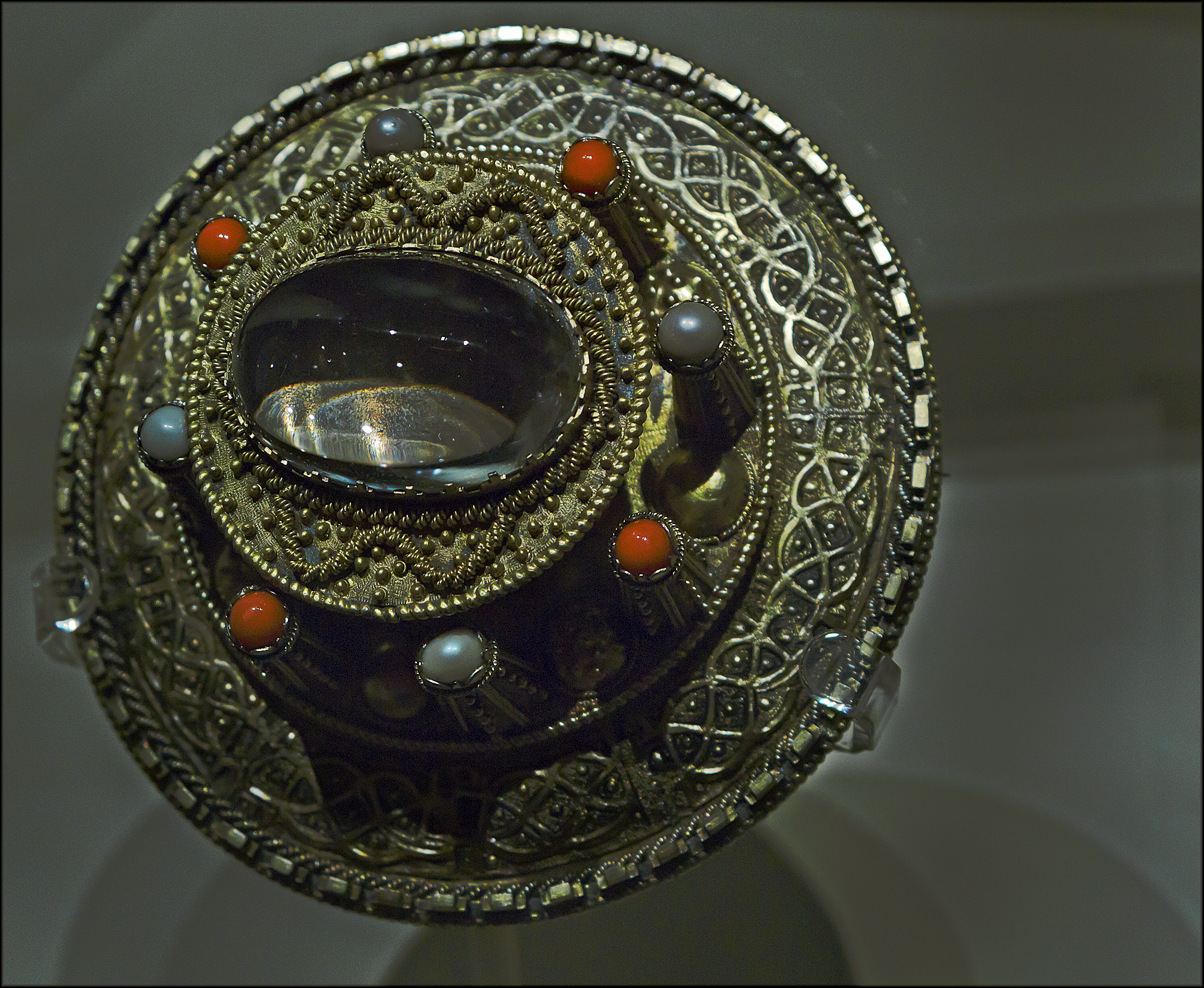
Modern copy of the Ugadale or Lossit Brooch, a 16th-century "turreted" brooch, which also contained a relic.

The brooch is one of three West Highland 16th-century silver turreted brooches centred on charmstones, though the brooches are thought to be resettings of stones which already had reputations. The others are the Lochbuy or Lochbuie Brooch in the British Museum, and the Ugadale or Lossit Brooch, also still in private hands. All three were exhibited together in the British Museum's exhibition Shakespeare: Staging the World in 2012. In the following months a replica made in recent years was exhibited in six local libraries in Argyll.

The silver disc at the back of the brooch is about 4.5 inches across, and the brooch is secured by a hinged pin (a later replacement) and catch behind it. Underneath the central stone is an empty compartment (said in 1905 to contain fragments of human bone), probably designed to hold a relic; the stone is set well above the base disc, and is surrounded by eight detached chatons or turrets, about 1.25 inches high, and each topped by a Scottish freshwater pearl. There is "a profusion of filigree work in the form of stellate appliqué ornaments and cabled borders". The style of decoration appears influenced by European workshops, and the brooch lacks the post-Insular motifs seen in the Lochbuie Brooch, and other late medieval West Highland objects in various media. The use of "turrets" as decoration was popular in late medieval jewellery, but usually in far less elaborate forms, with brooches having a number of small projecting turrets around a ring forming the brooch.

The dating of the Brooch of Lorn varies somewhat, though all contemporary specialists are clear that it is from well after Robert Bruce's lifetime. The British Museum describes it as "dated on stylistic grounds to late 16th C but incorporating earlier rock crystal charmstones in which there was revived interest in the 16th C.", and dates its own Lochbuie Brooch, which it believes was by the same hand, to "1600 (circa)". David Caldwell, curator of the Scottish medieval collections at the National Museums of Scotland, is quoted as saying, "It is a very important piece of west Highland art, but it dates from the mid-15th century, so cannot be Bruce’s. Maybe the original brooch fell to pieces and this one was substituted for it". Findlay in 1999 preferred the earlier part of the 16th century, and Catherine Gillies, curator for the clan, says, "The re-setting has been narrowed by style and historiography to roughly the third quarter of the 16th century", but still uses the description "medieval".

== History ==
In 1306 the Battle of Dalrigh took place where Robert the Bruce of Scotland was ambushed by John of Argyll, chief of the Clan MacDougall. The attack was revenge for the murder of John III Comyn, Lord of Badenoch, a cousin of John of Argyll and rival for the throne of Scotland. According to tradition, the attackers tried to dismount Robert the Bruce but only pulled off his cloak and brooch. The brooch was kept at Dunollie Castle until being moved to Gylen Castle on the island of Kerrera during the Covenanter Wars. The castle was captured and burned by David Leslie, Lord Newark in 1647 and the brooch was taken.

It was hidden until the early 19th century when it was found in a chest by Major Campbell of Bragleen after his return from fighting in the Napoleonic Wars. A document confirmed that it had been taken from Gylen Castle by the Campbells, and it was viewed by the MacDougall chief before Major Campbell's death in 1819. It was returned to the MacDougall in 1824 by General Duncan Campbell of Lochnell. Queen Victoria viewed the brooch during a visit with the MacDougall clan chief in 1842, taking it in her hand and examining it closely.

One rare appearance in public was when the MacDougal chief wore it when Elizabeth II visited Oban in 1956.

== Walter Scott ==
The "Broach of Lorn" was the subject of sections XI-XIII of the second canto of The Lord of the Isles, a poem by Sir Walter Scott (1815), although as he was writing at a point when no one had seen the brooch for over a century, and it was believed to be lost, his description was not very accurate, calling the brooch gold for example:

Whence the broach of burning gold
That clasps the Chieftain's mantle-fold,
Wrought and chased with rare device,
Studded fair with gems of price,...
