= Battle of Red Ford =

13th-century Scottish clan battle

Coordinates: 56.3073°N 5.2110°W

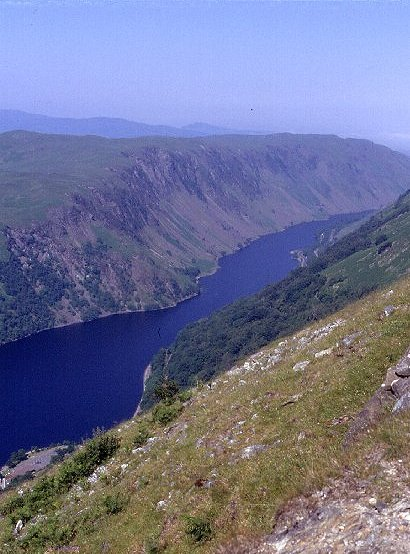
- Loch Awe where the battle is said to have taken place
Date	c. 1294 or 1296
Location	Loch Awe, Scotland
Result	MacDougall victory

Belligerents
Clan Campbell	Clan MacDougall

Commanders and leaders
Sir Colin Campbell	Alexander of Argyll

Strength
High	High

Casualties and losses
Heavy	Heavy

The Battle of Red Ford or Battle of the String of Lorne took place in 1294 or else after September 1296 between Clan Campbell and Clan MacDougall in Lorne, Scotland. The battle was fought over disputed lands. It ended in defeat of the Clan Campbell of Lochawe. The battle was on the borders of Loch Awe and Lorne, with the site and battle named Red Ford (Scottish Gaelic: Ath Dearg) after the ford which ran red with blood where the battle took place.

== Background ==
Clan MacDougall allied itself with John Balliol, a competitor for the Scottish crown. After his coronation in 1292, the clan's chief, Alasdair MacDubhgaill, was rewarded by being appointed Sheriff of Argyll in 1293. Clan MacDougall were then able to extend their influence, which led to disputes with other clans like Clan Campbell and Clan Donald. Cailean Mor or "Great Colin/Colin the Great", the 4th Chief of Clan Campbell, signed a Ragman Role Oath of Fealty pledging allegiance to King Edward I of England with other nobles on August 27, 1296, and died in the Battle of the Red Ford on the String of Lorne in Netherlorn, Argyll, which took place some time afterwards.

== Battle ==
Although no exact details of the battle are at hand, a great many people died on both sides and the ford ran red with blood of the fallen and the wounded. Cailean Mór Caimbeul (Sir Colin Campbell) was killed in battle.

== Aftermath ==
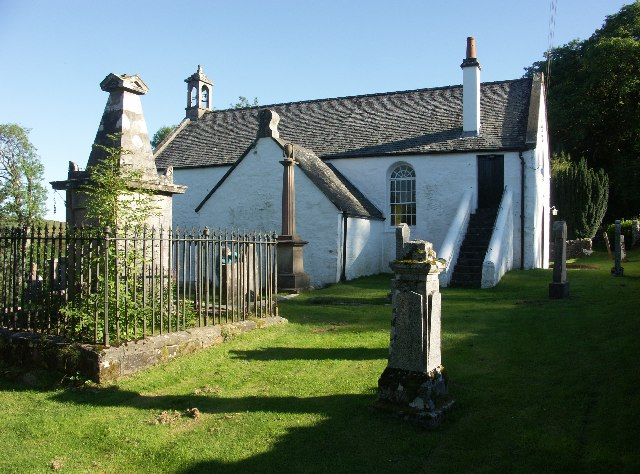
Kilchrenan Church where Sir Colin Campbell was buried after the battle

After the battle, Sir Colin Campbell's body was carried to the church of St. Peter the Deacon at Kilchrenan and buried there.
