= Dalrigh =

Coordinates: 56.2532°N 4.4116°W

Dalrigh: Scottish Gaelic: Dail Rìgh
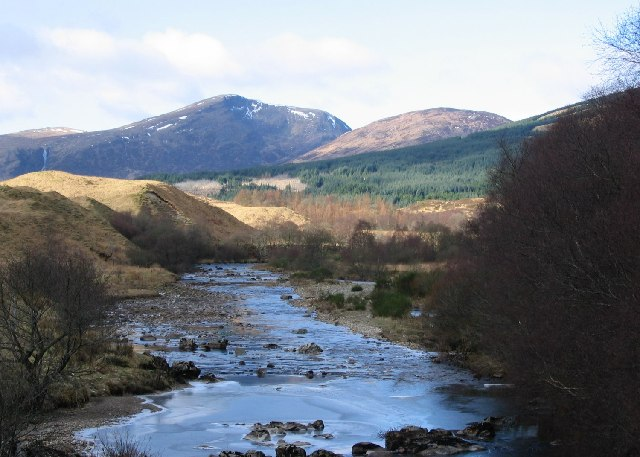
- River Fillan at Dalrigh

- Location within the Stirling council area
- OS grid reference: NN342291
- Civil parish: Killin
- Council area: Stirling
- Lieutenancy area: Stirling and Falkirk
- Country: Scotland
- Sovereign state: United Kingdom
- Post town: Crianlarich
- Postcode district: FK20
- Dialling code: 01838
- Police: Scotland
- Fire: Scottish
- Ambulance: Scottish
- UK Parliament: Stirling and Strathallan
- Scottish Parliament: Stirling

Dalrigh is a hamlet in Scotland near Tyndrum. The name means "The King's Field" in Scottish Gaelic.

The origin of the name stems specifically from the Battle of Dalrigh which was fought there in 1306, when King Robert I of Scotland (Bruce) was defeated by the Clan MacDougall.
