= Battle of the Pass of Brander =

Battle part of the civil war between the Bruce and Balliol factions

Coordinates: 56°24′47″N 5°10′49″W

Battle of Pass of Brander
- Part of Wars of Scottish Independence
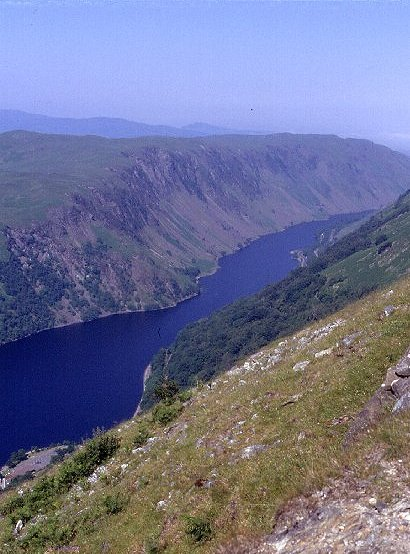
- Eastern end of Pass of Brander, dammed in 1959
Date	1308
Location	Bridge of Awe, Lorne, Scotland grid reference NN03822905
Result	Bruce victory

Belligerents
Bruce Royalist Army	Clan MacDougall; Clan Macnaghten

Commanders and leaders
Robert Bruce; James Douglas	John MacDougall of Lorn

Strength
Unknown	Unknown

Casualties and losses
Unknown	Unknown

The Battle of the Pass of Brander in Scotland forms a small part of the wider struggle known as the Wars of Scottish Independence, and a large part of the civil war between the Bruce and Balliol factions, a parallel and overlapping conflict. It was a victory for King Robert the Bruce over the MacDougalls of Argyll, kinsmen of John Comyn, also known as the Red Comyn, who had been killed by Bruce and his adherents at Dumfries in 1306. The sources do not allow us to determine the date of the battle with any degree of precision: various dates between 1308 and 1309 have been suggested, though the late summer of 1308 would seem to be the most likely. Traquair dates it to August 1308.

== Scottish Civil War ==
The slaying of John Comyn was a decisive act in Scottish political history. Soon after this Bruce had been crowned with the full support of the Scottish Church, which effectively set aside a papal interdict, although he still faced some formidable obstacles. The balance of power in Scotland shifted firmly in favour of the English. The chief weakness of the campaigns of Edward I of England, virtually from the outset, was that he was unable to build a lasting alliance with the Scottish nobility, a traditional power base on which his rule depended: friends at one moment were liable to be enemies at the next. With the murder of John Comyn, his extensive network of family and kinsmen, long in the forefront of the national struggle, were guaranteed to fight on the side of the English against Robert Bruce, whom they now considered to be the greater evil. Bruce's Scottish enemies controlled large and strategically important lands throughout the realm, in Galloway, Lochaber, Atholl, Ross, Buchan, and Badenoch and Strathspey. Much of Argyll was under the control of Alexander MacDougall, the Lord of Lorne, who had been related to John Comyn by marriage. Soon after Bruce was defeated by the English at the Battle of Methven, what was left of his army was mauled by Alexander's son, John of Lorne, also known as Iain 'Bacach'-'the Lame'-at the Battle of Dalrigh near Tyndrum. Bruce, who narrowly escaped capture, took to hiding.

Although the king made a remarkable recovery from these disasters, descending on Ayrshire in the spring of 1307 to begin a guerrilla war, it was by no means certain in these early days that he would be able to prevail against the combination of English military power and internal resistance. Soon after his Ayrshire campaign began he was favoured by a major stroke of good fortune: Edward I, on his way north with an army, died just short of the Scottish border in July 1307. His son, the far less capable Edward II, turned his attention towards English domestic politics, leaving his Scottish allies to manage as best they could. Bruce, who was convinced that the English were bound to return in the summer of 1308, decided to act with speed and thoroughness.

== Harrowing the North ==
The first attack came in September 1307 in Galloway, the hereditary home of the Balliols, against the MacDougalls and Macanns. Here the fighting was so fierce that the local peasantry took refuge over the border in Cumberland. The chief men in Galloway appealed in vain to Edward for help and were then forced to pay tribute to Bruce in return for a truce.

With this out of the way the king turned his attention to the north, breaking through the English-held Lowlands and heading for the Red Comyn's old stronghold in Lochaber. His march into the Highlands was supported by a fleet of galleys sailing up Loch Linnhe. John Bacach, acting for his elderly father, asked for a truce, unable to face the full force of this combined onslaught. Bruce then wheeled to the north-east to settle manners with his principal enemy, the Red Comyn's cousin and namesake, John Comyn, 3rd Earl of Buchan. This campaign lasted through the winter season, climaxing at the Battle of Inverurie in May 1308. Bruce was now at liberty to turn his full attention back to unfinished business in the west.

== Pass of Brander ==
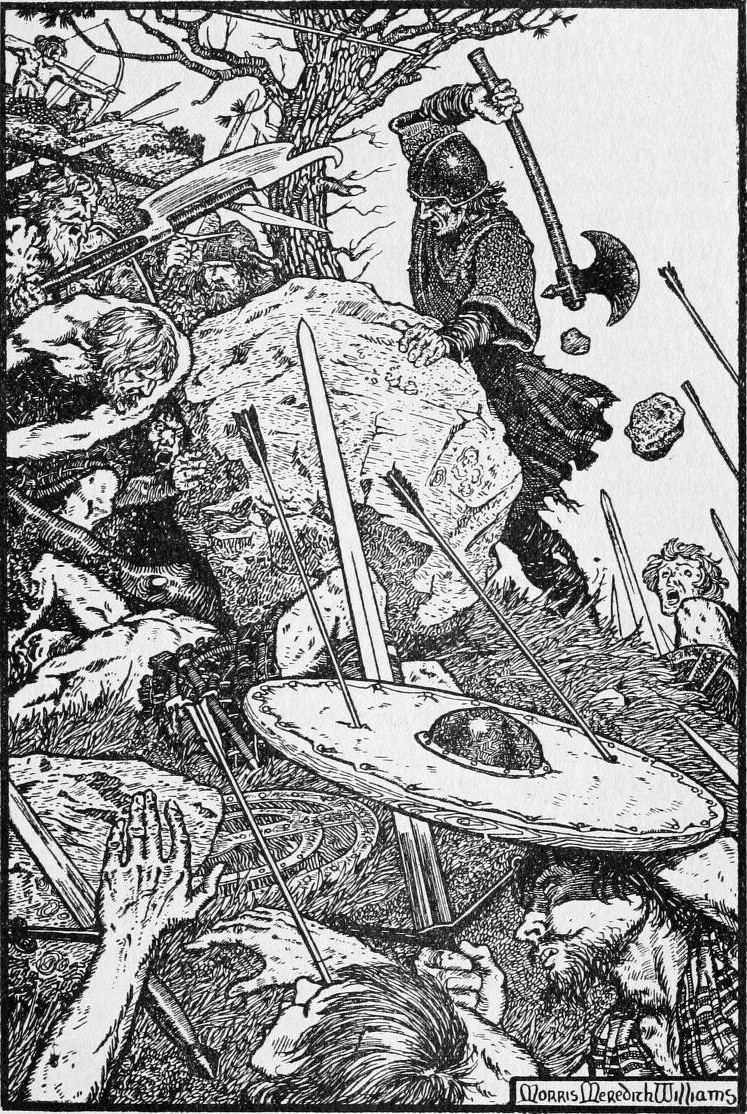

Alexander MacDougall, too old and sick to take part in the fighting, lay in his castle at Dunstaffnage so throughout the period his eldest son, John Bacach, was the main war leader of the MacDougalls. In the summer of 1308, possibly late August, his army took up position in the narrow Pass of Brander, where the River Awe slices through the southern slope of Ben Cruachan on its way down from Loch Awe. However, only Barbour's poem "The Brus" (late 14th century) places the battle; it does not mention the pass by name but the description fits. The large number of cairns around the Bridge of Awe may give some support to the location.

John Bacach, who gave as an excuse in a letter to King Edward that he was recovering from an illness, observed his dispositions from a galley on Loch Awe. His men were hidden in the hillside, overlooking the narrow path through the pass. If they looked for a repetition of the Battle of Dalrigh they were to be disappointed, for Bruce had now learned enough of guerrilla warfare and had enough men to sidestep such a trap. A party of loyal Scottish archers commanded by Sir James Douglas climbed even higher up Ben Cruachan and – completely unobserved – positioned themselves in the enemy's rear. As the MacDougalls attacked, they were caught in a vice, with King Robert coming from below and the Black Douglas from above. The men of Argyll wavered and then broke. They were chased westwards across the River Awe back to Dunstaffnage, while John escaped down the Loch in his galley, eventually taking refuge in England, like the Earl of Buchan. The Lord of Argyll surrendered and did homage to Bruce, but the following year he joined his son in exile, dying in 1310 in the service of Edward II.

The campaign of 1307 and 1308 ended the internal threat to the Scottish king. All of his Comyn enemies had been destroyed or exiled and their lands lost. The survivors no longer had a power base in Scotland, and were only able to continue the fight as volunteers in the English army. Nevertheless, a legacy of bitterness remained, eventually to return to Scotland in 1332, under very different circumstances.

== Battle of Ben Cruachan? ==
Like the date there continues to be some uncertainty over the exact location of the Brander battle. R. A. MacDonald in his 1997 book, The Kingdom of the Isles, argued that the traditional site of the battle is wrong, and that it took place further north on the shores of Loch Etive. From this he concludes that the fight should be more correctly known as the Battle of Ben Cruachan. However, a fight by Loch Etive could only have taken place if Bruce, coming from the east, had first cleared the Pass of Brander, although this was the obvious place for an ambush. An advance along the difficult shores of Loch Etive north of Ben Cruachan in the full view of the enemy galleys would have been military suicide. The author further contends that John's escape after the battle would have been possible only on Loch Etive, a sea loch, and not on Loch Awe, an inland loch, which, in any case was controlled by the Campbells, allies of Bruce. As for Loch Awe being "a Campbell lake" the author ignores his earlier point that the Campbells had been eclipsed at this time by the MacDougalls. Even on an inland loch a galley would offer the best mode of escape from slow moving land forces. A glance at the map will show that there could never have been a "Battle of Ben Cruachan".
