= Clan MacDougall =

Highland Scottish clan

- Clann MhicDhùghaill
- Crest: On a chapeau Gules furred Ermine, a dexter arm in armour embowed fessways couped Proper, holding a cross crosslet fitchée erect Gules.
- Motto: Buaidh no bàs (Victory or Death), also translated as "Conquer or Die".

Profile
- Region: Highland
- District: Argyll
- Plant badge: Bell Heather
- Animal: Raven
- Pipe music: "Caisteal Dhunolla" "Cumha Chaiptein MacDhughaill", "Failte Iain Cheir", "Jeanne Rea's Wedding", "Latha Dhunabharti", "Maid of Lorn", "MacDougall's Gathering", "MacDougall Gillies", "MacDougall's Lament", "MacDougall of Lunga", "MacDougall of Lunga-Paterson", "McDougall's Jig Oban Reel"

Chief
- Robin Morley MacDougall of MacDougall and Dunollie
- Historic seat: Dunollie Castle, Dunstaffnage Castle
Septs of Clan MacDougall
Carmichael, Conacher, Coull, Cowan, Cowie, Dowall, Livingston, MacConacher, MacCoull, MacCowan, MacCulloch, MacDole, MacDowall, MacDulothe, MacEachan, MacHowell, Kichan, MacLucas, MacLugash, MacLulich, MacNamell, Macoul, Macowl, McDougall, McDougle, McDowell,
Clan branches
MacDougall of MacDougall and Dunollie
MacDougall of Gallanach
MacDougall of Lunga
Allied clans
Clan Comyn
Clan Wallace
Clan MacNaghten
Rival clans
Clan Bruce
Clan Campbell
Clan MacDonald
Clan Robertson

Clan MacDougall is a Highland Scottish clan, historically based in and around Argyll. The Lord Lyon King of Arms, the Scottish official with responsibility for regulating heraldry in Scotland, issuing new grants of coats of arms, and serving as the judge of the Court of the Lord Lyon, recognizes under Scottish law the Chief of Clan MacDougall. The MacDougall chiefs share a common ancestry with the chiefs of Clan Donald in descent from Somerled of the 12th century (and thus further of the Viking-born Norse-Gael dynasty of House of Ivar). In the 13th century the Clan MacDougall whose chiefs were the original Lords of Argyll and later Lords of Lorne was the most powerful clan in the Western Highlands. During the Wars of Scottish Independence the MacDougalls sided with the Clan Comyn whose chiefs rivaled Robert the Bruce for the Scottish Crown and this resulted in clan battles between the MacDougalls and Bruce. This marked the MacDougall's fall from power and led to the rise of their relatives, the Clan Donald, who had supported Bruce and also the rise to power of the Clan Campbell who were then the habitual enemies of the MacDougalls and later of Clan Donald.

The MacDougalls supported the House of Stuart during the Scottish Civil War of the 17th century and during the Jacobite risings of the 18th century.

== History ==
=== Origins ===
The Clan MacDougall takes its name from Dubgall (Dougall), the son of Somerled. After Somerled's death at the Battle of Renfrew in 1164, Dougall held most of Argyll as well as the islands of Mull, Lismore, Jura, Tiree, Coll and others.

The Celtic first name Dougall, or Dugald is derived from the Gaelic dubh-gall, which means dark foreigner. Dougall's royal descent was acknowledged by the king of Norway and Dougall himself was styled as 'King of the South Isles and Lord of Lorne'. One of Dougall's sons seems to have been Óspakr-Hákon, a man installed as King of the Isles by Hákon Hákonarson, King of Norway in 1230. A certain son of Dougall was Duncan, who was in turn the father of Ewan. Duncan and Ewan built many castles to defend their territory. These included Dunstaffnage Castle, Dunollie Castle and Duntrune Castle on the main land. Whilst on the islands they built Aros Castle, Cairnburgh Castle, Dunchonnel Castle and Coeffin Castle. Dunollie Castle is believed to have been fortified since the 6th century and became the seat of the chief of Clan MacDougall. Duncan also built Ardchattan Priory and it was here that the MacDougall chiefs were buried until 1737.

=== Scottish-Norwegian War ===
Ewan's possessions on the islands were held from the king of Norway, whilst his possessions on the mainland were held from the king of Scotland. This made it hard for him to remain loyal to both. In 1263 King Haakon IV of Norway arrived with a huge fleet off the coast of Oban for an invasion of the west coast of Scotland. However, Ewan decided not to join the invasion, and thanks to old blood ties Haakon left him in peace. The Battle of Largs then took place and Ewan joined the side of Scots and attacked part of the Norse fleet. Following the Norwegian defeat at Largs and the subsequent death of king Haakon IV later the same year, the Norwegian policy of power projection and keeping control of the islands changed. With the treaty of Perth three years later, Norway ceded all of the Hebrides to Scotland, with Scotland recognising Norwegian sovereignty over Shetland and the Orkney islands in return.

=== Wars of Scottish Independence ===
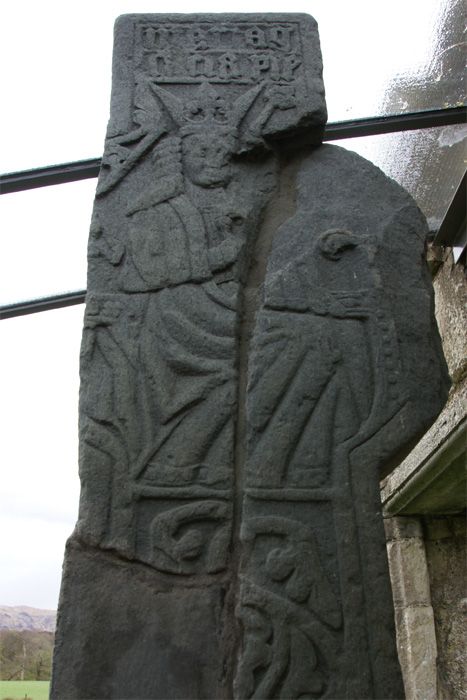
The MacDougall Cross, dating from about 1500 at Ardchattan Priory.

The MacDougalls' influence in Argyll brought them into conflict with the Clan Campbell. In 1294 John MacDougall of Argyll led the Clan MacDougall against the Clan Campbell at the Battle of Red Ford, where Sir Colin Campbell was killed but there were considerable losses on both sides.

The fourth chief of Clan MacDougall married a sister of John Comyn II of Badenoch (the "Black Comyn"), whose son, John Comyn III (the "Red Comyn") was stabbed to death by Robert the Bruce in the church of Greyfriars in Dumfries in 1306, and this brought the MacDougalls into conflict with the Bruces. The MacDougalls who had supported William Wallace in the cause of Scottish independence now found themselves in a blood feud with the Clan Bruce, whose cause was also of Scottish Independence. Shortly after Robert the Bruce's coronation at Scone he was forced by the English to retreat into Argyll, in an attempt to reach his Clan Campbell allies. However, the Clan MacDougall surprised the Bruce and defeated him in what was known as the Battle of Dalrigh. The king escaped but left behind what was described as a magnificent example of Celtic jewellery, known as the Brooch of Lorne and it became one of the Clan MacDougall's great treasures. Three years later Robert the Bruce led three thousand battle hardened veterans into Argyll against the MacDougalls. John MacDougall of Lorne set an ambush for them but in the ensuing Battle of the Pass of Brander the MacDougalls were defeated and forced to flee. The MacDougalls' lands were then forfeited by the king and he gave them to the Campbells for their loyalty.

Although the power of the MacDougalls was never regained, their fortunes were restored somewhat under John MacDougall's grandson, John Gallda MacDougall, Lord of Lorne. In the mid-14th century, the latter relocated from England to Scotland, married a niece of the reigning David II, King of Scotland, and regained the clan's ancestral lands in Lorne. Most of their mainland lands were then returned in a royal charter from David II of Scotland. Although the lordship of Lorne eventually passed into the hands of the Stewarts following John Gallda's death, the MacDougall chiefly line preserved through his son Allan.

=== 15th century ===
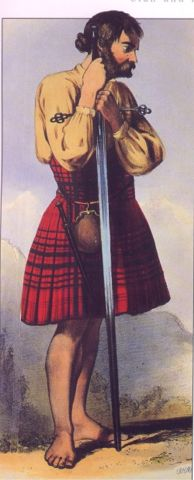
A Victorian era, romanticised depiction of a member of the clan by R. R. McIan, from The Clans of the Scottish Highlands, published in 1845.

In 1468 the Clan MacDougall fought against the Clan Stewart of Appin at the Battle of Stalc.

=== 17th century and Civil War ===
During the civil war of the 17th century the MacDougalls were generally royalists and chief Alexander MacDougall led five hundred of his clansmen into battle. However, after the defeat of the royalist James Graham, 1st Marquess of Montrose, a Covenanter army, led by David Leslie, Lord Newark was sent into Argyll to deal with royalist supporters. The MacDougalls lands were restored however, after the restoration on the monarchy in 1660.

=== 18th century and Jacobite risings ===
During the Jacobite rising of 1715 the Clan MacDougall supported the Jacobite cause and fought at the Battle of Sheriffmuir after which the chief was forced into exile but later returned to Scotland to live as a fugitive. He was pardoned in 1727.

His son and next chief, Alexander MacDougall did not take part in the Jacobite rising of 1745. However, his brother and some of the clansmen did indeed fight as Jacobites at the Battle of Culloden in 1746. The fighting force of the clan at this time is given as 200 men.

== Chief ==
The current chief of the clan is Robin MacDougall, 32nd of MacDougall and Dunollie, the son of the prior chief, Madam Morag Morley MacDougall, who passed in February 2026. She was the daughter of the sister of the previous clan chief, Coline Helen Elizabeth MacDougall of MacDougall and Dunollie. The latter was in turn a daughter of the previous chief, Alexander James MacDougall of Dunollie. The chief of Clan MacDougall represents the senior line of Somerled's descendants.

The chief's coat of arms is blazoned: Quarterly, 1st and 4th, azure, a lion rampant argent; 2nd and 3rd, or, a galley sails furled sable, surmounted of a beacon gules. This coat of arms specifically dates to 1931, and is very similar to one inscribed upon an 18th-century tombstone in the chiefs' Kilbride burial ground.

== Castles ==
Castles built or owned by the Clan MacDougall have included amongst many others:

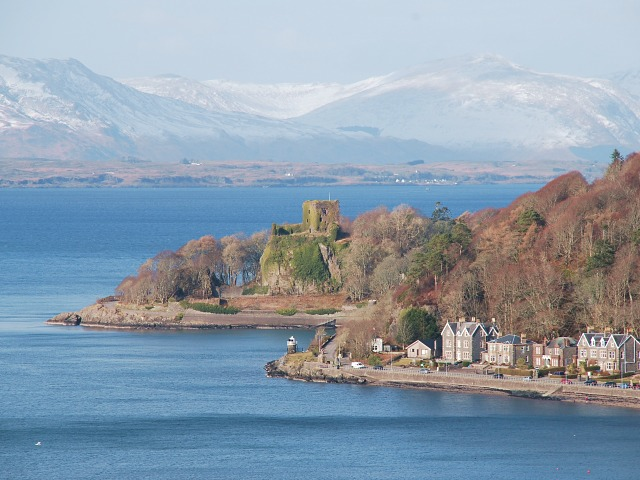
Dunollie Castle, historic seat of the MacDougalls

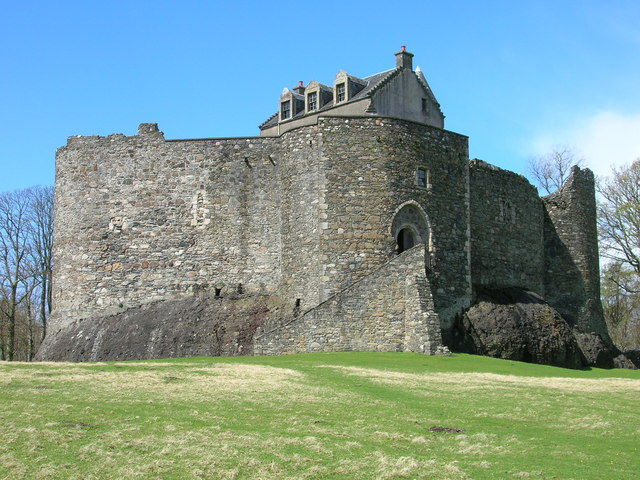
Dunstaffnage Castle, historic seat of the MacDougalls

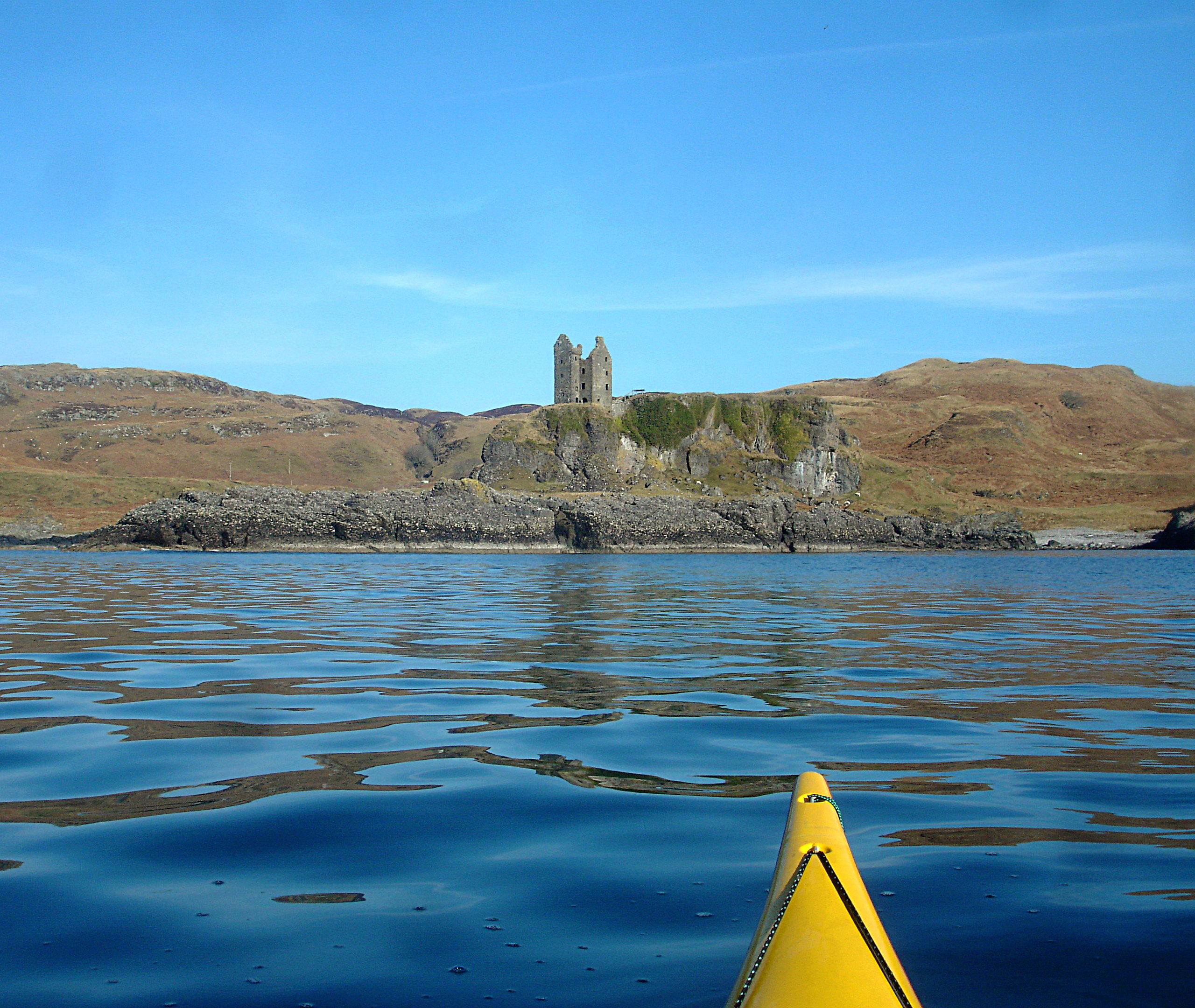
Gylen Castle, a MacDougall property

- Dunollie Castle near Oban, Argyll. There are now the remains of a strong but ruinous tower and other buildings that are overgrown. The site has actually been fortified since the days of the kings of Dál Riata in the sixth and seventh centuries. The present castle was built by the MacDougalls of Lorn. The Brooch of Lorn, which is said to have been captured from Robert the Bruce by the MacDougalls was kept at Dunollie Castle. The castle was attacked by Argyll, chief of Clan Campbell in 1644 and in 1647 it was besieged by a Covenanter army under General David Leslie, in which in the castle was sacked and burnt. During the Jacobite rising of 1715 the castle was attacked again when the MacDougalls supported the Stewarts and as a result the lands were forfeited. However, the lands were restored in 1745 and in 1746 the MacDougalls built nearby Dunollie House, although there was an earlier house there dating from about 1600, and the old castle was abandoned. The castle is now in a dangerous condition but is still owned by the MacDougalls.
- Dunstaffnage Castle, three and a half miles north-east of Oban, Argyll is a large courtyard castle with a high curtain wall, and later gatehouse range. The kings of Dál Riata also had a strong hold there. The Stone of Scone (or Stone of Destiny) is also said to have been kept at the castle. The present castle was built by the MacDougalls and was besieged by Robert the Bruce after the MacDougalls were defeated at the Battle of the Pass of Brander in 1309. The Bruce then made it a royal castle with the Campbells as the keepers. There is also a chapel nearby that dates from the thirteenth century. The castle is now in the care of Historic Scotland.
- Gylen Castle, on the south coast of Kerrera is a small tower house that was and still is a property of the MacDougalls. An earlier castle on the site was where Alexander II of Scotland may have died during an expedition to recover the Western Isles in the mid-thirteenth century. The current castle was completed by Duncan MacDougall in 1582. It was however torched (along with Dunollie Castle) by the Covenanters under General David Leslie in 1647.
- Cairnburgh Castle, on the Treshnish Isles, off the Isle of Mull, is a ruinous castle once held by the MacDougalls that passed to the Crown with the MacDougalls as keepers in 1309.
- Dunchonnel Castle, on the Garvellach Isles is a ruinous castle that was once held by the MacDougalls.
- Coeffin Castle, on the Isle of Lismore is a ruinous castle once held by the MacDougalls.
- Duart Castle, on Mull. The castle was probably built by the MacDougalls in the 13th century, and came into the possession of the MacLeans in the fourteenth century.
- Mingary Castle in Lochaber. The castle may have been built by the MacDougalls in the 13th century. As such it would appear to exemplify the northern extension of clan's power from the 12th century.

== Lords ==
- Dugald, son of Somerled
- Dugald Screech and Donnchadh of Argyll (died 1237×1248) (and perhaps Óspakr-Hákon), sons of Dugald
- Eóghan MacDubhgall, son of Donnchadh (died 1268×1275)
- Alexander of Argyll, son of Eoghan (died 1310×1311, perhaps at Carlisle), married a daughter of John I Comyn, Lord of Badenoch, driven from Scotland by Robert Bruce and his allies; his sister Mary married Magnus Olafsson, King of Mann and the Isles and, on Magnus's death, remarried with Maol Íosa, Mormaer of Strathearn
- John of Lorne, son of Alexander (died on pilgrimage to Canterbury, September 1317), enemy of Bruce and Bruce's ally Angus Óg of Islay, defeated and driven into exile

== Tartans ==
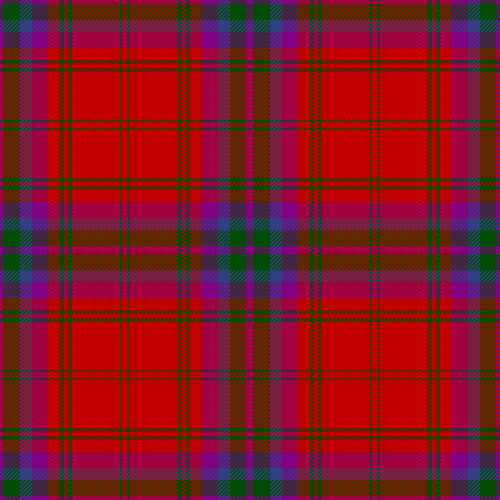
MacDougall tartan, as published in 1842 in the Vestiarium Scoticum.

- MacDougall (Modern)
- MacDougall (Ancient)
- MacDougall (Dress)

== See also ==
- Ardchattan Priory
- Clan Macdowall
- Donnchadh of Argyll
- Lord of Lorne
- The King's Tax
