= The King's Tax =

The King's Tax, or Cis an Righ as it known in Scottish Gaelic, is a lament from the Scottish Highlands which has been composed for bagpipes by Ronald Ban of Clan MacDougall.
