= Battle of Dalrigh =

Battle of Scottish Independence

Coordinates: 56°25′25″N 4°41′16″W

- Part of Wars of Scottish Independence
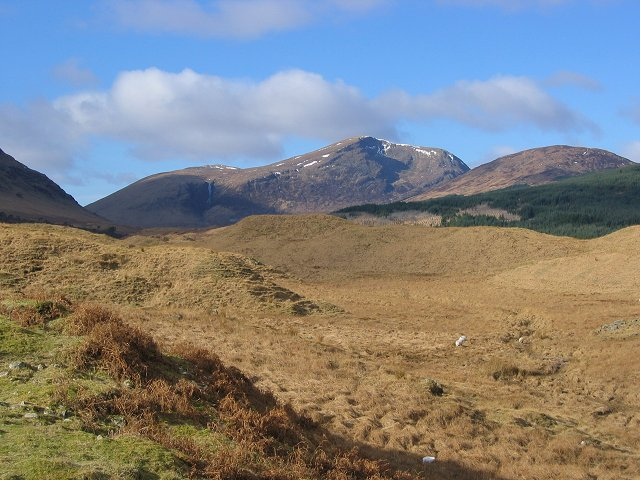
- Dalrigh where the battle took place
Date	Summer 1306
Location	Dalrigh, Lorne, Scotland grid reference NN342289
Result	MacDougall victory

Belligerents
Scottish Royal Army	Clan MacDougall; Clan Macnaghten

Commanders and leaders
Robert the Bruce	John of Argyll

Strength
c. 500	c. 1,000

Casualties and losses
Heavy	Light

The Battle of Dalrigh, also known as the Battle of Dail Righ, Battle of Dalry or Battle of Strathfillan, was fought in 1306 between the army of King Robert the Bruce against Clan MacDougall of Argyll, who were allies of Clan Comyn and the English. It took place at the hamlet of Dalrigh (the "King's Field" in the Scottish Gaelic language) near Tyndrum in Perthshire, Scotland (not to be confused with Dalry, Ayrshire). Bruce's army, reeling westwards after defeat by the English on 19 June at the Battle of Methven, was intercepted and all but destroyed, with Bruce himself narrowly escaping capture. The battle took place sometime between July and early August, but the exact date is unknown.

== MacDougalls ==
By the late 13th century, the Clan MacDougall had emerged in Argyll as powerful descendants of Somerled, the first Lord of the Isles and former king of the Hebrides. Alexander of Argyll, the head of the family, was related by marriage to King John Balliol and his nephew John Comyn. He attained high office in the short time John was king, being appointed Sheriff of Lorn in February 1293. Alexander managed to extend his power still further at the expense of the great family of MacDonalds of Islay, the Lords of the Isles, and the Campbells of Loch Awe, whom he defeated in battle sometime in the mid-1290s. However, the outbreak of the War of Independence in 1296 placed the MacDougalls on the side of Balliol. On 10 February 1306, in Greyfriars Church, John Comyn was killed by Robert the Bruce and his men. Soon after Robert Bruce was crowned King of Scots at Scone. The MacDougalls fought against King Robert and in supporting the losing side, lost all.

== King's Field ==
On 19 June 1306 Bruce and his army were caught unprepared in their night camp at the Battle of Methven, west of Perth, by Aymer de Valence, an English general acting for Edward I. What was left of his army retreated westwards, towards the mountains of Argyll. When they reached Strathfillan they found their path blocked at Tyndrum by a large force of MacDougalls, said to have numbered 1,000 men, commanded by Alexander's son, John of Lorne, also known as John Bacach-'the Lame.' We do not know Valence's exact location at this time, but it is likely that his army was not far to the east in pursuit of his defeated enemy. Unable to retreat, Bruce's little army of 300 to 500, including women, the aged, etc. and a guard of Highland men, was forced into battle in disadvantageous circumstances in western Perthshire near the border with Argyll. The exact site of the battle is known in Gaelic as Dail Righ-the King's Field-though it is uncertain if this was the name at the time or added afterwards by the chroniclers. Locals have placed the battle at a number of local place-names (Lasantulich, Dalchaisnie, Inverchaddan, and names with Sasunnaich).

The only sources we have for the Battle of Dalrigh are pro-Bruce, and tend at every turn to put a favourable interpretation upon the King's actions. John Barbour has him 'boldly waiting' to engage John in battle, though 'his followers were all too few'. However, Bruce's army had just been defeated and would have needed time to recoup; so it is possible that the MacDougalls took him by surprise. Barbour provides some justification for such an interpretation, providing no description of preparations or dispositions-as he does elsewhere-, just an account of a quick and very close engagement.

Bruce's remaining horses were killed by the MacDougall axemen, who also wounded many of his men, including Sir James Douglas and Gilbert de la Hay. Under considerable pressure Bruce did his best to disengage;

They thereupon withdrew. In this

There was no mark of cowardice.
They kept together; and the king
Was ever busy rescuing
The rearmost of his company.
With skill and valour there wrought he,
And safely all his men withdrew.
He daunted those that would pursue
So none durst leave their cloe array,
For he was never far away.

Bruce was so heavily involved in action with the rearguard that he found himself at one point alone and under attack between a hill and the lochside, a pass so narrow that he could not turn his horse. According to tradition, Bruce was so hard pressed that one of his assailants tore off the studded brooch that fastened his cloak. Known as the "Brooch of Lorn" it was in possession of the Campbells until 1826 when it was turned over to the MacDougall family.

For the king to be placed in such a position, seemingly unsupported, provides some further evidence of the weakness of the royal forces. The enemy was fought off and the army retreated to safety; but not long after it ceased to exist as an organised military force.

== Flight ==
After Dalrigh, Bruce, now styled dismissively as 'King Hob' in English propaganda, was little better than a fugitive, closely pursued by his many enemies, both domestic and foreign. For a time his party took refuge in the mountains of Atholl. From here the king sent Queen Elizabeth, his daughter Marjorie Bruce, his sister, Mary, and Isabella MacDuff the Countess of Buchan to the relative safety of Kildrummy Castle, near the River Don in Aberdeenshire. With James Douglas and a few others he then escaped southwards into the territory of his friend Maol Choluim II, Earl of Lennox. From here he was helped to cross over to the Kintyre Peninsula by way of Bute, where he was aided by Aonghus Óg Mac Domhnaill, chief of the MacDonalds and Lord of the Isles. The MacDonalds were enemies of the MacDougalls. Bruce was given temporary refuge in Dunaverty Castle, a location far too exposed and dangerous to remain in for long. From there Angus MacDonald took the king to Rathlin Island, off the coast of Ulster, and a MacDonald territory. King Robert spent the winter there and re-emerged in the early spring of 1307. The recovery of his cause from this point counts as one of the most remarkable episodes in the history of warfare. Two years after Dalrigh the MacDougalls were destroyed at the Battle of Pass of Brander. After his victory at Bannockburn, King Robert divided the MacDougall lands among the clans loyal to him, including the MacDonalds.
