= John of Argyll =

Scottish nobleman

- Lord of Argyll
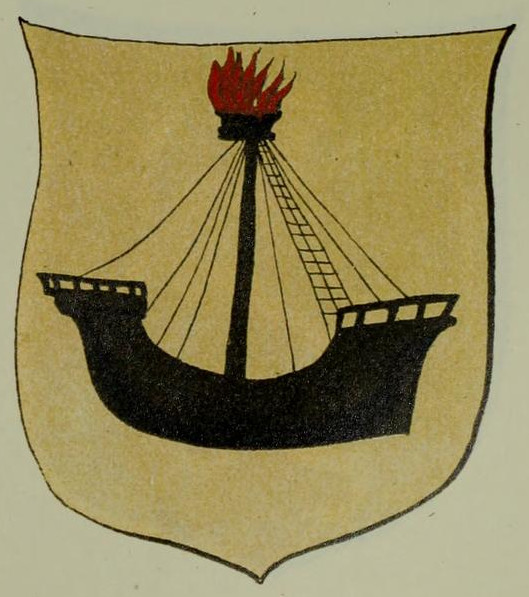
- Reign: 1310–1316
- Predecessor: Alasdair de Argyll
- Died: 1316; Ospringe, Kent, England
- Noble family: Clan MacDougall
- Issue: Many, including Eóghan, Ailean, Somhairle, Alasdair Óg

John of Argyll, (Note: Also Latin: Johannes de Ergadia, Scottish Gaelic: Eóin MacDubhgaill (medieval), John MacDougall, John of Lorne, Eóin Bacach MacDhùghaillor or Iain MacDhùghaill) was a Scottish nobleman of the early 14th century. He is often known today as John Bacach, "the Lame", but there is no authority for that as a contemporary or near-contemporary nickname.

== Biography ==
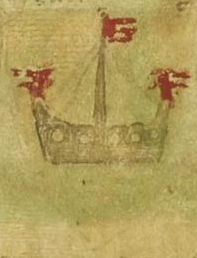
Coat of arms of the Lord of Argyll as it appears in the fourteenth-century Balliol Roll:Or, a galley sable with dragon heads at prow and stern and flag flying gules, charged on the hull with four portholes argent.

The son of Alexander MacDougall (Alasdair MacDubhgall), Lord of Argyll, by a daughter of John I Comyn, Lord of Badenoch, John appears in the records in 1291 swearing fealty to Edward I of England. From his father's and mother's background, he inherited the pro-Balliol sympathies that determined his family's and his own activities during the Great Cause and the First War of Scottish Independence. As the Balliol stalwarts of the west, the Bruce heartland, the MacDougalls and Comyns of Badenoch eventually found themselves up against Bruce-backed MacDonalds, Campbells, the Menteiths, men of Lennox and the Stewarts, in addition to Bruce's own Carrick forces.

After the deposition of King John de Balliol in 1296, John's father Alexander opposed the power of his new overlord Edward I. The failure of Balliol's kingship fuelled conflict between the MacDougalls and other West Highland kindreds. One of John's most famous actions in later Gaelic tradition was killing Cailean Mór (or "Sir Colin Campbell"). It is not clear what the exact source of conflict was at the time. Cailean, Bruce's second cousin, was "Ballie" of Loch Awe and Ardscotnish, a position he was granted either by King John Balliol or Edward I of England. Sometime after September 1296, Cailean was killed by John's forces at the "Red Ford" on the borders of Loch Awe and Lorne in a skirmish. In 1299, Alexander MacDougall killed Alexander Og MacDonald, Lord of the Isles in Ireland.

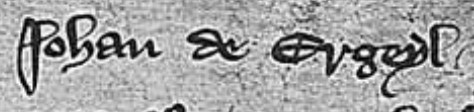
Image a

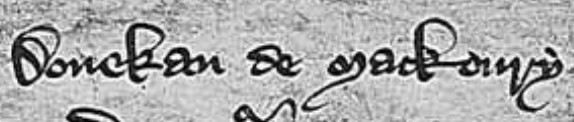
Image b

The names of John MacDougall (image a) and Duncan MacGodfrey (image b), close allies in arms of Dungal, as they appear in a fourteenth-century petition to Edward II.

The MacDougall kindred gradually grew more cooperative with King Edward as their rivals grew less so. In 1305 both John and his father became members of the advisory council of Edward's lieutenant in Scotland, John of Brittany. The following year, Robert de Brus, Earl of Carrick, went into open revolt against the English crown, declaring himself King of Scots. The new King Robert met with an upset against pro-English forces at the Battle of Methven and fled into the west. It was during this time in 1306 that Robert met John's MacDougall forces blocking their way at Tyndrum. At what became known as the Battle of Dail Righ ("King's field"), John defeated Bruce's forces.

In the following year, Edward rewarded MacDougall by appointing him sheriff of Argyll and Inchegall. However, as MacDougall informed Edward by letter in 1308, Robert's power was becoming increasingly difficult to live with, and the position of MacDougalls was becoming critical. After experiencing defeat at the Battle of Pass of Brander in 1308, the main MacDougall seat, Dunstaffnage Castle, was captured by Bruce forces. John fled to England with his father entering King Robert's peace. By 1310, John's father Alexander had joined him in England, both attending a royal council at Westminster. Despite losing his father in 1310, in the following years John remained in English service. He was put in charge of English fleets in 1311 and 1314 as Admiral of the Irish Sea and in 1315 conquered the Isle of Man for the English crown. John began receiving a pension from Edward II of England in 1316. In this year he died at Ospringe in Kent, while making a pilgrimage to Canterbury. He left the Galwegian "Dungal MacDouall" (Dungall MacDubhgall), a fellow political exile from Scotland, in charge of his will.

John left several sons and daughters, though his wife or wives are not known. Among his offspring known by name are:

- Ewen (Eóghan)
- Alan (Ailean)
- Somhairle
- Alexander (Alasdair) Óg
- Mary (Maire)

He had another daughter who married one Patrick de Graham. John's son Eóghan returned to Scotland with Edward Balliol's unsuccessful attempt at the Scottish throne in the 1330s. The MacDougalls re-emerged in Argyll in unknown circumstances later in the century. John's grandson, through Ailean, known as John Gallda ("the Foreigner"), is on record from 1338. Later, John Gallda was styling himself "Lord of Argyll".

== Citations ==
Preceded by Alasdair (Alexander)	Lord of Argyll d. 1316	Vacant Title next held by Eóin (John) Gallda
