= Lord of Argyll =

Scottish feudal lordship

The sovereign or feudal lordship of Argyle was the holding of the senior branch of descendants of Somerled (Somhairle), this branch becoming soon known as Clan MacDougall

Construction of the Lordship of Argyll-Lorne essentially started with Donnchadh mac Dubhgaill, son of Dubgall mac Somairle.

During Donnchadh's time the great feuds that had been causing war on the western seaboard of Scotland since Somhairle mac Gille Bhrighde were coming to an end. Ruaidhri mac Raghnaill, son of Ragnall mac Somairle, King of the Isles and Lord of Argyll, was at peace with Raghnall mac Gofraidh, King of Mann, and had become friendly with Ailean mac Lachlainn, Lord of Galloway and Constable of Scotland. In this context, Alexander II, the King of Scotland, led expeditions into Argyll in 1221 and 1222, expeditions which led to Donnchadh being recognised or appointed to the Lordship of Lorne. Donnchadh remained a strong supporter of the Scottish crown against the interests of Ruaidhri mac Raghnaill and Amhlaibh Dubh.

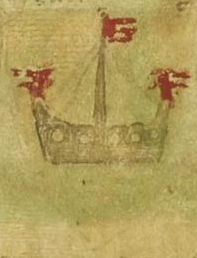
The arms of the Lord of Argyll depicted in the fourteenth-century Balliol Roll. (Note: The escutcheon is blazoned: or, a galley sable with dragon heads at prow and stern and flag flying gules, charged on the hull with four portholes argent. The coat of arms corresponds to the seal of Alasdair Mac Dubhghaill. Since the galley (lymphad) was a symbol of Clann Dubhghaill and seemingly Raghnall mac Somhairle—ancestor of Clann Ruaidhrí and Clann Domhnaill—it is conceivable that it was also a symbol of the Clann Somhairle progenitor, Somhairle mac Giolla Brighde. It was also a symbol of the Crovan dynasty, which could mean that it passed to Somhairle's family through his wife.)

These expeditions into Argyll appear to have given Donnchadh domination of the kindreds of all Argyll in place of Ruaídhrí. Around 1225, Donnchadh de Argadia ("of Argyll") appeared in a charter of Maol Domhnaich, Earl of Lennox (d. 1250) made to Paisley Abbey; this appearance is notable because it is the first attestation of the locative family name "of Argyll", the name that Donnchadh and his descendants would use to identify themselves among the higher nobility of Scotland.

In 1229, the Manx king, Ragnvald Godredsson, was killed. Fear of Galwegian or Scottish royal intervention led the Manxmen to appeal to the Norwegian crown. The Norwegian expedition, led by Óspakr-Hákon, probably Donnchadh's brother, ravished Kintyre and in 1230 attacked the Stewart controlled Isle of Bute. This expedition was unsuccessful and led to Uspak's death. Donnchadh remained firmly in possession of his Argyll lordship.

The Mormaerdom or Kingdom of Argyll was also a lordship in High Medieval Scotland.

== Mormaers of Argyll ==
- Somhairle mac Gillebride (?? - 1164)
- Ragnall mac Somairle (1164 - 1207)
- Domhnall mac Raghnaill (1207 - ??)

== Stewart lords of Lorne ==
- Lord of Lorne

== Campbell lords of Lorne ==
- The Campbell lairds of Lochawe inherited the lordship of Lorne via their foremother, Isabel Stewart, daughter of the 2nd Lord of Lorne. The Campbells received the titles Earl and then Duke of Argyll
