= Lord of Lorne =

Scottish title peerage

For the Child ballad, see The Lord of Lorn and the False Steward.

Lord of Lorne is a Scottish title of nobility that has been created twice.

Arms of MacDougall, Feudal Lords of Lorne

Arms of Stewart, Lords of Lorne

== First creation ==
The title was first created for Robert Stewart of Durisdeer (died 1403), son of John Stewart of Innermeath (died 1421). Robert's mother was Isobel MacDougall, daughter of John Gallda MacDougall, Lord of Lorne (died 1371×1377). The MacDougalls, formerly exiled from their Argyll lands in the reign of Robert I, King of Scotland (died 1329), had been restored to their Lorne lands in the reign of David II, King of Scotland. The close association between John Gallda and David meant that the former was out of favour in the succeeding Stewart regime under Robert II, King of Scotland (died 1390). When John Gallda died without a male heir his two legitimate daughters, including Isabel, were subsequently married off to the sons of John Stewart of Innermeath.

Arms of Campbell, Lords of Lorne

Robert Stewart, 1st Lord of Lorne was succeeded by his oldest son John, member of the Parliament of Scotland. In 1463 the second lord died and his younger brother Walter became 3rd Lord Lorne. Walter Stewart resigned the lordship on 30 November 1463, or 17 April 1470, and was created 1st Lord Innermeath on the same day.

== Second creation ==
The next creation was for Colin Campbell, 1st Earl of Argyll, the husband of Isabelle Stewart, daughter of John Stewart, 2nd Lord Lorne and niece of William Stewart, 1st Lord Innermeath, on 17 April 1470. The title was a subordinate title of the Earl of Argyll and from 1701 is a subordinate title of the Duke of Argyll.

== Feudal lordship ==
- John Gallda MacDougall, Lord of Lorne (died 1371×1377)

== Lords Lorne, First Creation (1439) ==
- Robert Stewart, 1st Lord Lorne (1382–1449), brother of James Stewart, the Black Knight of Lorn
- John Stewart, 2nd Lord Lorne (d. 1463)
- Walter Stewart, 3rd Lord Lorne (d. 1489) (Resigned, 1463)

== Lords Lorne, Second Creation (1470) ==
- See the Earl of Argyll

== See also ==
- Lord of Argyll
