= Lorne, Scotland =

Ancient Scottish province

Coordinates: 56°25′N 5°28′W

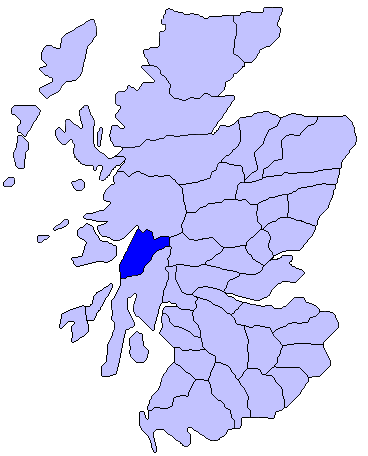
Map of Scotland showing the historical province of Lorne

Lorne (or Lorn; Scottish Gaelic: Latharna) is an ancient province in the west of Scotland, which is now a district in the Argyll and Bute council area. The district gives its name to the Lynn of Lorn National Scenic Area, one of forty such areas in Scotland, which have been defined so as to identify areas of exceptional scenery and to ensure its protection from inappropriate development. The national scenic areas cover 15,726 ha, of which 10,088 ha are marine seascape, and includes the whole of the island of Lismore, along with neighbouring areas on the mainland such as Benderloch and Port Appin, and the Shuna Island.

The region may have given its name to the traditional Scottish breakfast dish Lorne sausage.

== Geography ==
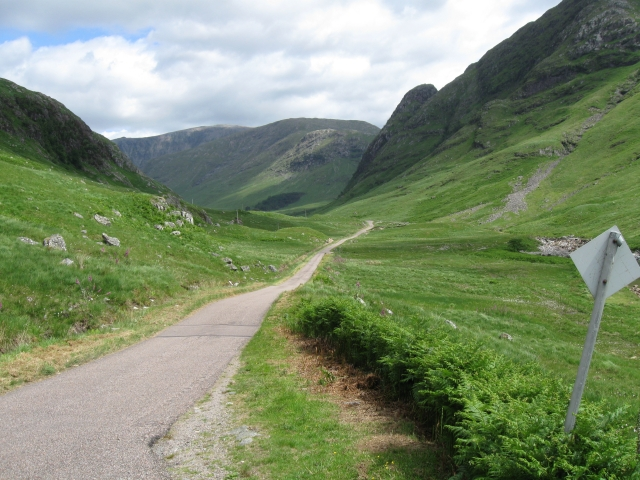
Glen Etive

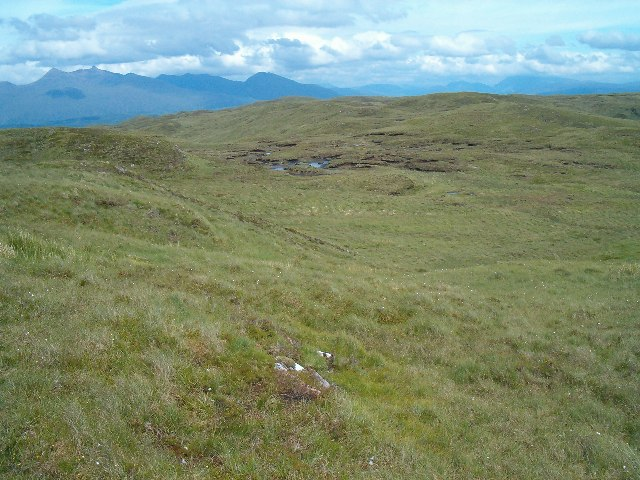
Typical moorland in the south of Lorn

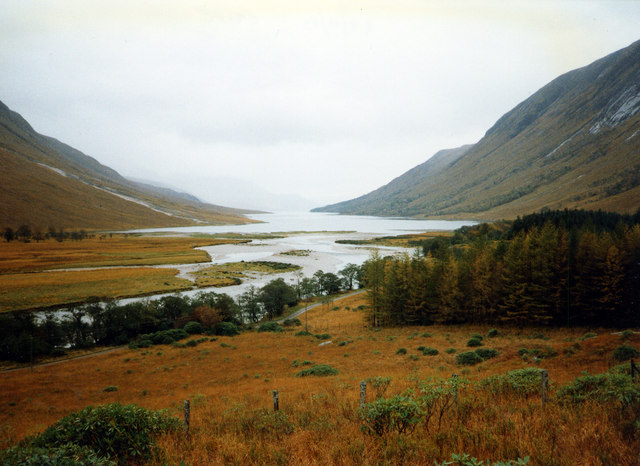
Loch Etive

Lorn is bordered on the west by the Firth of Lorne, which separates it from Mull. The northern border is Glen Coe, and Rannoch Moor, which detach it from Lochaber, while on the east, the Bridge of Orchy hills, and Glen Orchy, separate it from Breadalbane. Running along the south eastern border, Loch Awe separates Lorn from Knapdale, and the rest of Argyll to the south.

The north of Lorn is almost entirely dominated by Glen Etive, and its surrounding mountains. The south, by contrast, is mainly undulating boggy moorland, punctured by occasional lochs, and meandering burns. The two parts of Lorn are separated by the Pass of Brander, which forms the main transport corridor, aside from routes around Lorn's perimeter.

Though it has only existed since the 19th century, Oban is the only large settlement in Lorn, and forms the modern district's capital. Once labelled the "Charing Cross of the Highlands" because of the range of steamer connections with the islands and Argyll coast, Oban is still a busy port for ferries, cruise liners, fishing boats and pleasure craft.

== History ==
=== Early history ===
In the Iron Age, the inhabitants of Lorn established a number of hillforts, of which the most substantial was Dun Ormidale, located at Gallanach, south of Oban. Whether or not they were Picts is unclear.

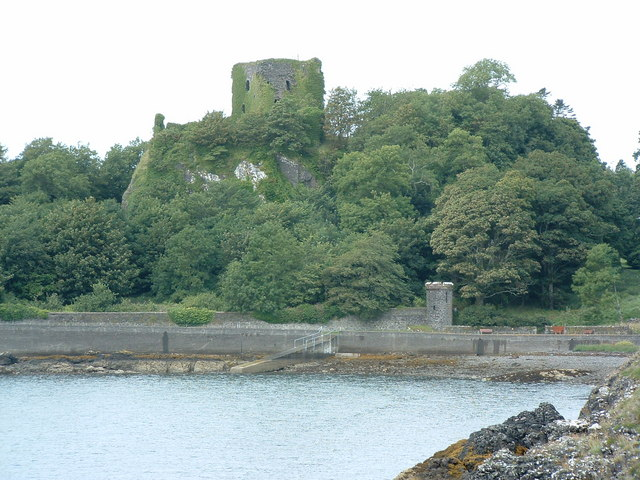
The medieval castle at the site of Dun Ollaigh, capital of the Cenél Loairn

It was long thought that, in the 6th century, Irish migrants crossed the straits of Moyle, invading Lorn and the coast to its south, as well as the islands between there and Moyle in Ulster, establishing the Gaelic kingdom of Dál Riata. However, recent scholarship has questioned this conclusion, citing a lack of evidence for any invasion, and suggesting instead that this area of the west coast of Scotland and the north east coast of Ireland, so close geographically and connected by the sea rather than divided by it, had shared a language and culture prior to this. In around AD 500, Loarn mac Eirc (a brother of Fergus Mór) became king of Dál Riata, founding the Cenél Loairn. Gradually Dál Riata came to be split between a small number of kin groups, of which the Cenél Loairn controlled Mull and what is now Lorn; the realm of the Cenél Loairn (including Mull) acquired the name Lorn in reference to them.

The Cenél Loairn established their main stronghold - Dun Ollaigh - a few miles north of Dun Ormidale. Irish annals record several attacks on Dun Ollaigh, including at least one by the king of Dál Riata, but the circumstances are not clear. Dun Ollaigh remained a stronghold throughout the existence of Dál Riata, but was abandoned shortly afterwards.

=== Norway ===
In the 9th century, Viking invasions led to the destruction of Dál Riata, and its replacement by the Kingdom of the Isles, which became part of the crown of Norway following Norwegian unification. The Kingdom of the Isles was much more extensive than Dál Riata, encompassing also the Outer Hebrides and Skye. To Norway, the island kingdom became known as Suðreyjar (Old Norse, traditionally anglicised as Sodor), meaning southern isles. The former lands of Dal Riata acquired the geographic description Argyle (now Argyll): the Gaelic coast.

In the late 11th century, Magnus Barefoot, the Norwegian king, launched a military campaign which, in 1098, led the king of Scotland to quitclaim to Magnus all claim of sovereign authority over the territory of the Kingdom of the Isles. In the mid 12th century, Somerled seized control of the realm from his brother-in-law, the King of the Isles. When he died in 1164 as king, half of the kingdom was retained by his descendants. Lorn appears to have been fallen into possession of his son, Dubgall, eponymous ancestor of the MacDougalls.

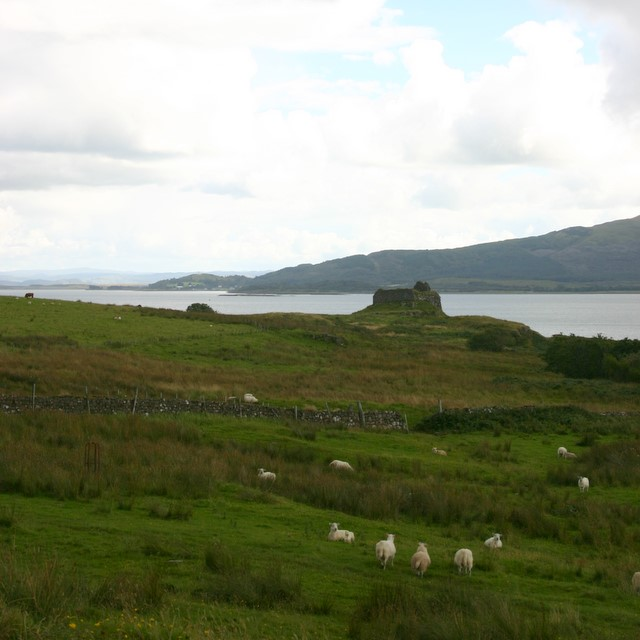
Ardtornish Castle

In the 13th century, the MacDougalls established the twin castles of Aros (in Mull) and Ardtornish (on the mainland, opposite), which together controlled the Sound of Mull. Later in the century, they built Dunstaffnage Castle, a few miles to the north of Dun Ollaigh, as a more comfortable headquarters. At the end of the century, Dun Ollaigh itself was re-fortified, though only as an earthwork.

Throughout the early 13th century, the Scottish King, Alexander II, had made aggressive attempts to expand his realm into Suðreyjar, despite Edgar's earlier quitclaim. This naturally led to a period of high hostility between Norway and Scotland, that continued under Alexander III, Alexander II's successor. Haakon died shortly after the indecisive Battle of Largs. In 1266, his more peaceable successor ceded his nominal authority over Suðreyjar to the Scottish king (Alexander III) by the Treaty of Perth, in return for a very large sum of money. Alexander generally acknowledged the semi-independent authority of Somerled's heirs; the former Suðreyjar had become Scottish crown dependencies, rather than parts of Scotland.

=== Early Scottish Lords of Lorne ===
At the end of the century, a dispute arose over the Scottish kingship between King John Balliol and Robert the Bruce. By this point, Somerled's descendants had formed into three families - as well as Dougall's heirs (the MacDougalls), there were also the heirs of his nephew Donald (the MacDonalds), and those of Donald's brother (the MacRory); the MacDougalls backed Balliol, while the MacDonalds and MacRory backed the Bruce. When the Bruce defeated John, he declared the MacDougall lands forfeit, and gave them to the MacDonalds and MacRory, with the latter acquiring Lorn (and hence, Mull).

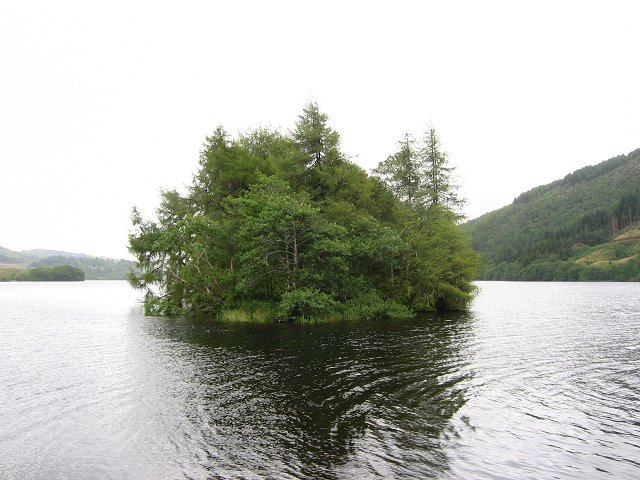
The site of the Castle of the Red Haired Maiden, the traditional origin of Campbell power

Robert the Bruce had received support against the MacDougalls from the Campbells, based at Innis Chonnell Castle at Lorn's southern edge (and traditionally at the Castle of the Red Haired Maiden, in the south of Lorn). Neil Campbell, son of the baron of Innis Chonnel, was rewarded with marriage to Robert's sister, Mary. Initially, Robert expanded the shrieval authority of the sheriff of Perth to include Lorn, but in 1326, he separated it, giving shrieval authority over Lorn to Neil's son, Dougall Campbell; the Campbell lands were at the centre of the Argyll region, so the position became the sheriff of Argyll, despite only covering Lorn (shrieval authority for southern Argyll was at Tarbert).

In 1346, John MacDonald, the head of the MacDonald family, married the heir of the MacRory family, thereby consolidating the remains of Somerled's realm, and transforming it into the Lordship of the Isles, though from Somerled on, it was the MacDonalds that bore the title, Lord of the Isles. In 1354, though in exile and without control of his ancestral lands, John, the MacDougall heir, quitclaimed any rights he had over Mull to the Lord of the Isles. When Robert's son, David II, King of Scotland, became king, he spent some time in English captivity; following his release, in 1357, he restored MacDougall authority over Lorn, effectively cancelling Robert's grant to the MacRory. The 1354 quitclaim, which seems to have been an attempt to ensure peace in just such an eventuality, took automatic effect, splitting Mull from Lorn, and making it subject to the Lordship of the Isles.

John MacDougall married David II's niece, Johanna. They had two daughters, but no sons who survived infancy. John however, had apparently fathered a bastard, named Alan. Upon John's death, the leadership of the MacDougalls passed to Alan, in accordance with Gaelic succession law (in which bastards could inherit, as long as they were acknowledged by their father). The Lordship of Lorne, however, passed into abeyance.

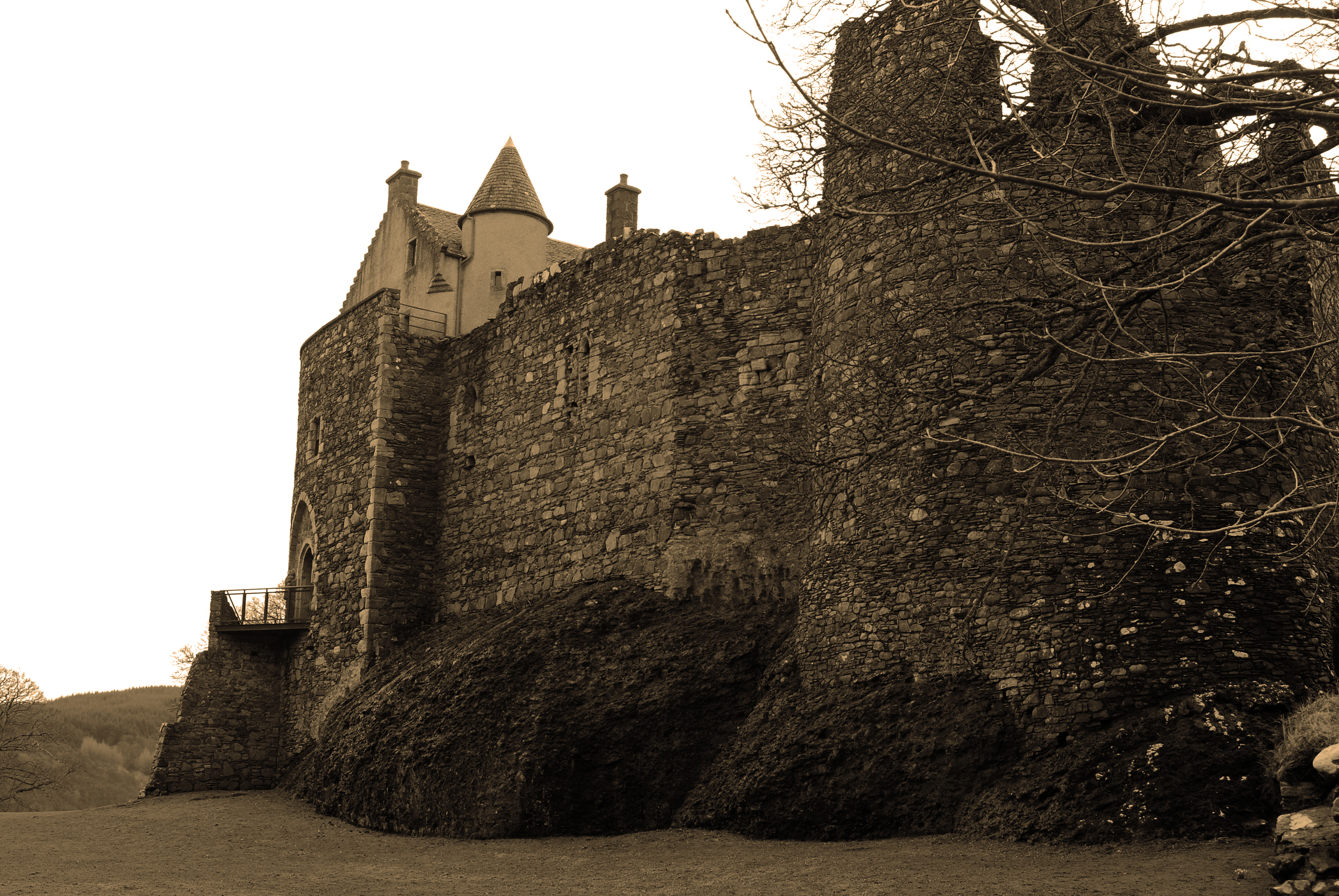
Dunstaffnage Castle, site of John Stewart's murder

John and Johanna's legitimate daughter, Isabel, married Sir John Stewart of Innermeath, the great-grandson of John Stewart of Bonkyll, and consequently a distant relation of the Scottish royal family. Isabel's son, Robert Stewart, was therefore acknowledged as Lord of Lorne, in accordance with Scottish inheritance law. This may have given rise to the traditional folk song, The Lord of Lorn and the False Steward, as pro-MacDougall propaganda (using the romance Roswall and Lillian as its template). There was certainly rivalry between supporters of Alan MacDougall and those of Robert's son, John Stewart; on his way to get married at the chapel of Dunstaffnage Castle, John was fatally stabbed by Alan McCoul, a supporter of Alan MacDougall, but managed to stay alive just long enough to complete the marriage ceremony.

On John Stewart's death, the Lordship of Lorne was inherited by his younger brother, William Stewart. John Stewart's marriage, however, was his second; his first wife, who had died young, had given birth to a daughter, Isabel. In the same year that John Stewart died, King James III persuaded William Stewart to surrender the (comital) Lordship, in return for the newly created (non-comital) title Lord Innermeath, and associated lands.

=== More Campbells ===
Sir Colin Campbell, was the maternal grandson of Robert, the brother of Robert III. Robert had been de facto ruler of Scotland for nearly 40 years (in the reigns of his father - Robert II, and brother), and was an early rival to his nephew, James I. Robert's son, Murdoch, had continued the rivalry with James. Despite this Sir Colin had been loyal to James, rather than to his own grandfather, or to his uncle (Murdoch), and was therefore rewarded with the new title Earl of Argyll, after James II had come to the throne; the heartland of Sir Colin's family, like that of Dougall Campbell's before him, was roughly at the centre of mainland Argyll.

Arms of the Lordship of Lorne, under the Campbells

Sir Colin set about affixing comital authority to his title, by marrying Isabel Stewart. In 1468 (5 years after William Stewart had surrendered the office), Sir Colin was acknowledged as the Lord of Lorne, which became a subsidiary title of the earldom. The traditional heraldic symbol of Lorn was the lymphad (a galley), so the coat of arms for the Lordship of Lorne became a black lymphad on a silver field, quartered with the Campbell family arms.

On the earlier death of John Stewart, the MacDougalls had seized Dunstaffnage castle, but they were eventually ejected when an army was sent by James III. In 1470, James appointed Sir Colin, and his heirs, to captainship of the castle, but on the king's behalf, rather than as their personal possession. Sir Colin's heirs appointed a hereditary captain of their own, rather than holding it directly - a fact which became the subject of a 20th-century court case over residency.

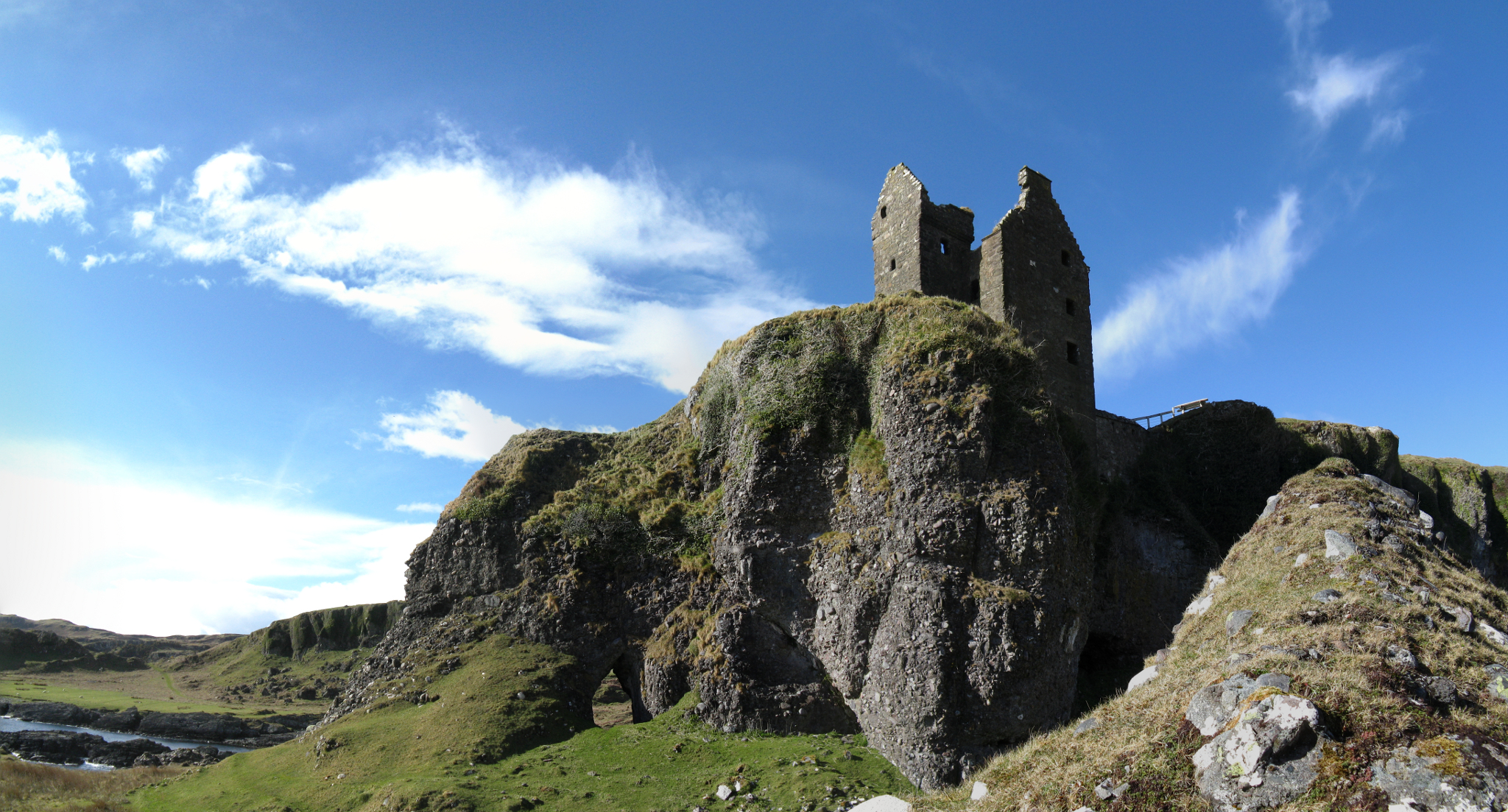
Gylen Castle

In 1582, the MacDougalls built Gylen Castle on an island near their former capital. However, in the civil war of the next century, Archibald Campbell (Sir Colin's heir) was the de facto head of the Covenanter government, while the MacDougalls were Royalists; a Covenanter army (under General Leslie) therefore burnt Gylen Castle down, which they also did to Dunollie. However, Archibald's son was a royalist, so the Campbells ultimately retained their status, despite the eventual fall of the Covenanter regime.

In 1746, following Jacobite insurrections, the Heritable Jurisdictions Act abolished comital authority over Lorn, and Campbell control of the Argyll sheriffdom. The Campbells could now only assert their (substantial) influence as Landlords.

=== Modern times ===
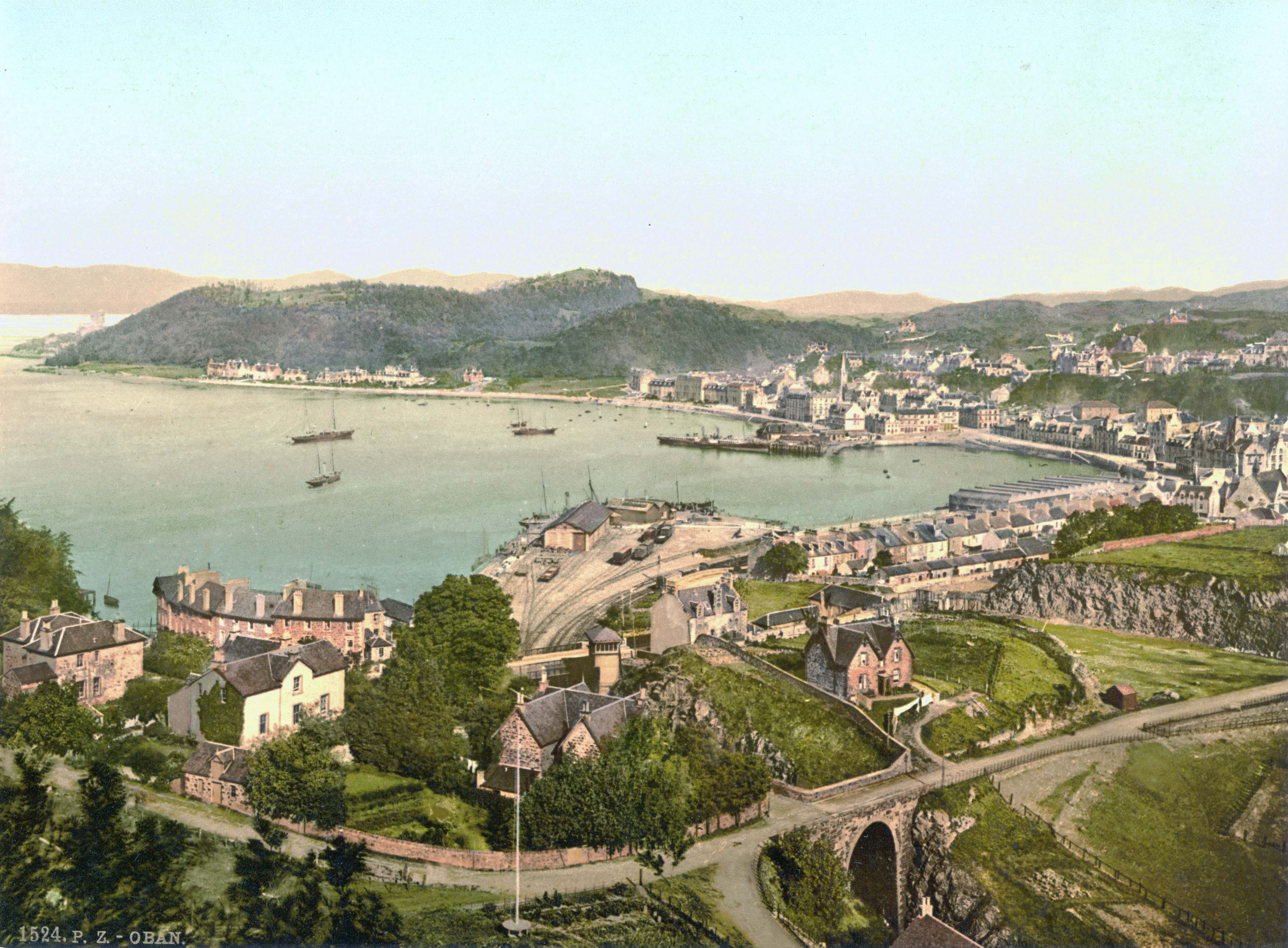
Oban in 1900

Historically, Lorn was a very rural area. Even in the area around the capitals, the local settlement was a mere village, supporting very few households, and only small scale fishing, trade, shipbuilding, or quarrying. However, in 1794, the Oban Distillery was founded, which quickly improved the economic situation in western Lorn, and soon the town of Oban was established - still the only substantial settlement in Lorn. In the late 19th century, the construction of the Callander and Oban Railway brought a further burst of economic improvement, and helped to alleviate conditions in other parts of Lorn.

In 1889, counties were formally created in Scotland, on shrieval boundaries, by a dedicated Local Government Act; Lorn naturally, therefore, became part of the newly created County of Argyll.

On two occasions in the mid 20th century, Lorn twice experienced a brief restoration of geopolitical importance. During World War II, Oban was used by Royal Navy ships, and became an important base in the Battle of the Atlantic. During the Cold War, the first Transatlantic Telephone Cable (TAT-1) came ashore here; it carried the Hot Line between the presidents of the US and the USSR.

Following late 20th century reforms, Lorne is now part of the wider council area of Argyll and Bute.
