= Alexander of Argyll =

Scottish magnate (died 1310)

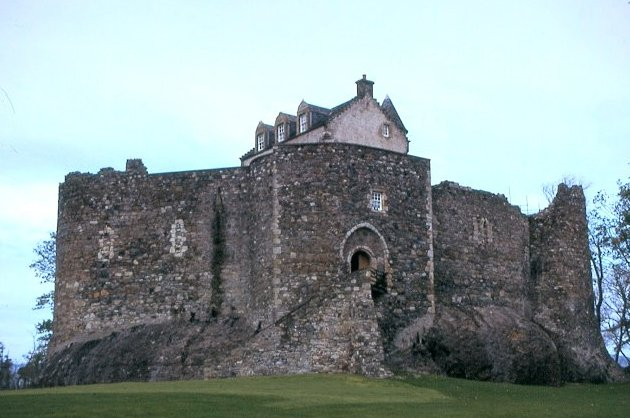
Dunstaffnage Castle, Alexander's main seat.

Alexander of Argyll, also known as Alexander of Lorne, and Alexander MacDougall (Scottish Gaelic: Alasdair MacDubhgaill; died 1310), was a Scottish magnate from the late 13th and early 14th century.

Alexander was the son of Ewen MacDougall, Lord of Argyll. Although the details of Alexander's early life are largely unknown, he appears to have succeeded to his father's position as Lord of Argyll and Lorne and head of the MacDougall kindred after the latter's death in 1268. Alexander appears to have been named after King Alexander III of Scotland. Under the latter's authority, Alexander was involved in the Scottish expedition that quelled a revolt on the Isle of Man in 1275.

In 1284 he joined with other Scottish noblemen who acknowledged Margaret of Norway as the heir of Alexander.

== Argyll ==
As the succession crisis resulting from the unexpected deaths of Alexander III (1286) and then his designated successor Margaret (1290) developed, Argyll took a prominent part in the succession dispute. He was married to the sister of John II Comyn, Lord of Badenoch, key ally and kinsman of the Balliols. Alexander found himself as a firm Balliol supporter as the Balliol's vied against the Bruces to take the succession. He served as one of John de Balliol's auditors during the Great Cause, and after the latter's accession as King, Alexander was a key ally and helped King John establish his sheriffdoms in the west.

The alliance between MacDougall and Balliol developed from and caused an alliance between MacDougall's main regional rival, Alexander Óg MacDonald, and the Bruces. Alexander was captured during the Battle of Dunbar by English forces and was imprisoned at Berwick Castle until his release in 1297.

After the deposition of Balliol in 1296, MacDougall opposed the power of his new overlord Edward I of England. The failure of Balliol's kingship also helped to fuel conflict between the two west Highland kindreds as part of the civil and international conflict known today as the First War of Scottish Independence; in 1299 MacDougall killed Alexander Og.

MacDougall became reconciled with King Edward and in 1305 became a member of the King's Scottish council. The murder of Alexander's kinsman John III Comyn, Lord of Badenoch in 1306 by Robert de Brus, Earl of Carrick, hardened MacDougall's anti-Bruce position, and this became opposition to Robert's kingship as the latter was crowned King of Scots at Scone later in the year. Through 1307 and into 1308 King Robert assaulted the MacDougall-Comyn position in the Western Highlands. After Alexander's seat, Dunstaffnage Castle, was captured by Bruce forces in 1308, Alexander entered the King's peace. Although Alexander attended the St Andrews parliament of 1309, by 1310 Alexander and his son had gone into England to join the service of King Edward II of England. Alexander died in that year, perhaps in English service in Ireland.

Alexander's only known wife was a daughter of the John I Comyn, Lord of Badenoch. He had many children, including:

- John of Argyll, his son and successor
- Donnchadh
- Christiana, m. Maol Mhuire Lamont

Alexander Og's wife, Juliana, may have been a daughter or sister of Alexander. Another of his daughters, unknown by name, married Lachlann Mac Ruaidhrí, son of Ailéan mac Ruaidhrí. He had several other sons.

== Notes ==
| Preceded by Eóghan (Ewen) | Lord of Argyll; 1268-1310 | Succeeded by Eóin (John) |
