= Alasdair Óg of Islay =

Scottish lord & clan leader (??–c.1299)

Alasdair Óg Mac Domhnaill
- Lord of Islay
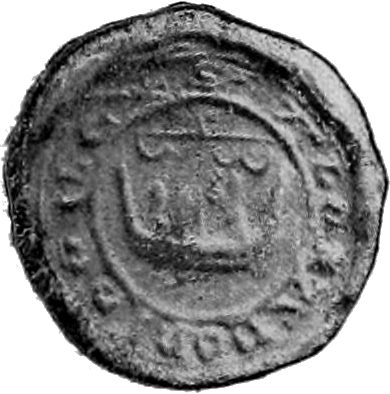
- The seal of Alasdair Óg. The device shows a galley manned by two men attending the ropes. The seal's legend reads "S' ALEXANDRI DE ISLE".
- Predecessor: Aonghus Mór mac Domhnaill
- Successor: Aonghus Óg Mac Domhnaill?
- Died: probably 1299
- Noble family: Clann Domhnaill
- Spouse: Juliana
- Father: Aonghus Mór mac Domhnaill

Alasdair Óg Mac Domhnaill (died probably 1299) was Lord of Islay and chief of Clann Domhnaill. (Note: Since the 1980s, academics have accorded Alasdair Óg various patronyms in English secondary sources: Alastair MacDonald, Alastair Óg MacDomhnaill, Alexander Mac Domnaill, Alexander Mac Donald, Alexander macDonald, Alexander MacDonald, Alexander Macdonald, and Alexander Og MacDonald. Likewise, with an epithet, Alasdair Óg's name has been rendered: Alasdair Óg, Alasdair Òg, Alastair Óg, Alexander Og, Alexander Òg, and Alexander Óg.) He was the eldest son of Aonghus Mór mac Domhnaill, Lord of Islay. Alasdair Óg seems to first appear on record in 1264, when he was held as a hostage of the Scottish Crown for his father's good behaviour. During Alasdair Óg's career, the Scottish realm endured a succession crisis as a result of the unexpected death of Margaret, Maid of Norway, heir to the Scottish throne, in 1290. One of several factions that staked a claim to the throne was the Bruce kindred. Both Alasdair Óg and his father were cosignatories of the Turnberry Band, a pact that may have partly concerned the Bruces' royal aspirations.

Aonghus Mór last appears on record in 1293, which seems to have been about the time that Alasdair Óg succeeded him as chief of Clann Domhnaill. Alasdair Óg's wife was apparently a member of Clann Dubhghaill. This marital alliance evidently brought Clann Domhnaill and Clann Dubhghaill into a territorial conflict. The chief of the latter kindred, Alasdair Mac Dubhghaill, was a close adherent to the successful claimant to the kingship, John Balliol. Following the latter's defeat and overthrow by Edward I, King of England, Alasdair Óg aligned his kindred with the English in an attempt to contend with Clann Dubhghaill. As such, Alasdair Óg was employed as the agent of English authority in the west, and Clann Domhnaill appears on record throughout the 1290s campaigning against Clann Dubhghaill, Clann Ruaidhrí, and the Comyn kindred.

Alasdair Óg's rivalry with Alasdair Mac Dubhghaill apparently brought about his own demise, as Alasdair Óg appears to be identical to the like-named man slain by Alasdair Mac Dubhghaill of Clann Dubhghaill in 1299. The Clann Domhnaill succession is uncertain following this date, as several men appear on record accorded the territorial designation "of Islay", a style that corresponded to the lordship of the Isles. Alasdair Óg is known to have had at least six sons. He was the brother of the Clann Domhnaill chief (Aonghus Óg) who was slain campaigning in Ireland in 1318. Over the succeeding decades, the Clann Domhnaill chiefship came to be permanently occupied by the descendants of Aonghus Óg. As a result, Alasdair Óg's reputation suffered within early modern Clann Domhnaill tradition, and the history of his descendants—Clann Alasdair—was largely ignored. Nevertheless, the most prominent Clann Domhnaill gallowglass families in Ireland descended from him. Members of Clann Alasdair claimed the Clann Domhnaill chiefship into the last half of the fourteenth century. Alasdair Óg may also be the eponymous ancestor of Clann Alasdair of Loup.

== Parentage ==
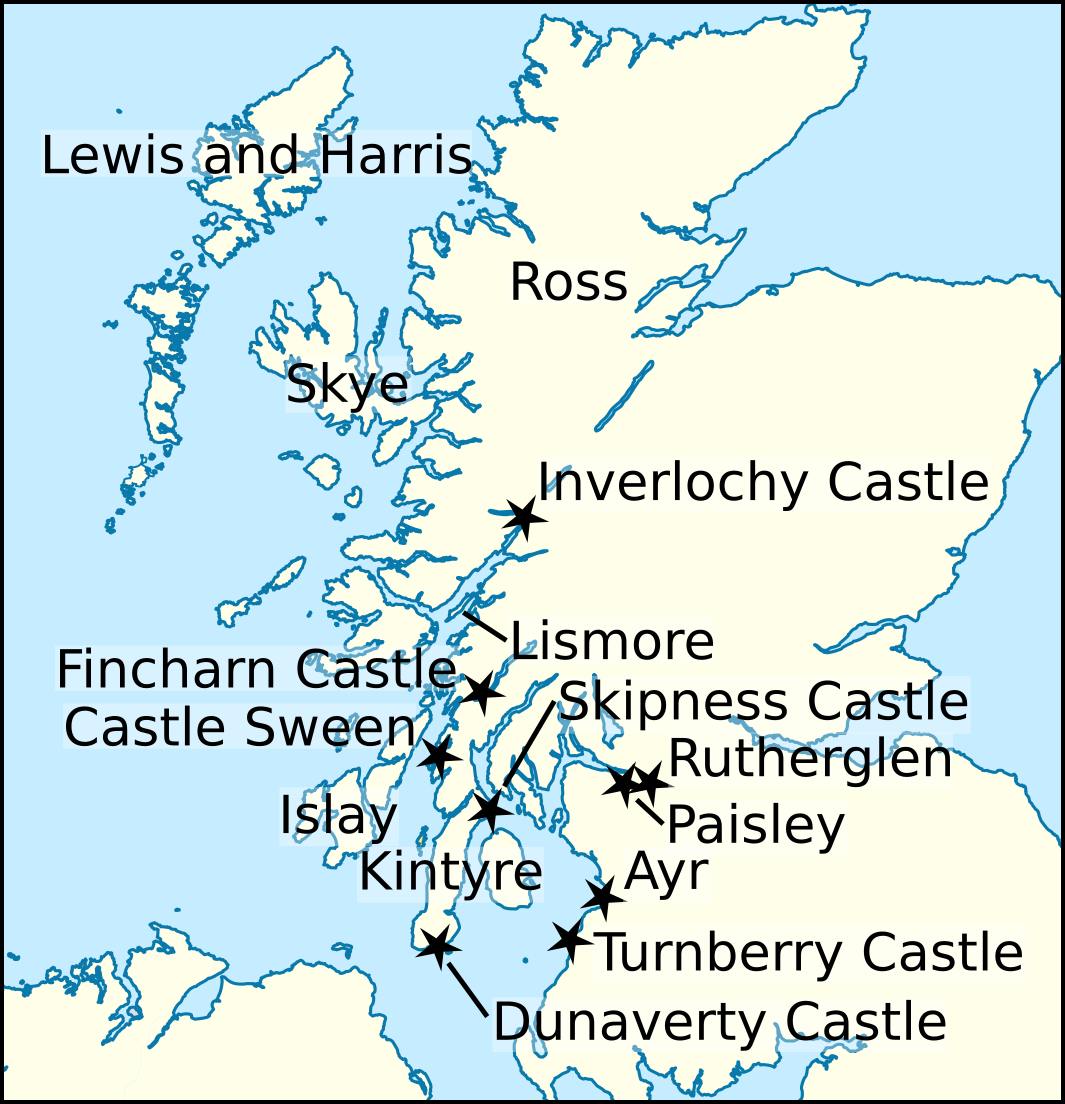
Locations relating to Alasdair Óg's life and times.

Alasdair Óg was an elder son of Aonghus Mór mac Domhnaill, Lord of Islay. (Note: The Gaelic Óg and Mór mean "young" and "big" respectively. The epithet Óg accorded to Alasdair Óg appears to differentiate him from his like-named elder uncle, Alasdair Mór mac Domhnaill.) The latter was a son of Domhnall mac Raghnaill, eponym of Clann Domhnaill. As such, Aonghus Mór can be regarded as the first Mac Domhnaill. Clann Domhnaill was the junior-most of three main branches of Clann Somhairle. The other two branches were Clann Dubhghaill and Clann Ruaidhrí—families respectively descended from (Domhnall's uncle) Dubhghall mac Somhairle and (Domhnall's elder brother) Ruaidhrí mac Raghnaill. Alasdair Óg had a sister who married Domhnall Óg Ó Domhnaill, King of Tír Chonaill; a younger brother, Aonghus Óg; another brother, Eóin Sprangach, ancestor of the Ardnamurchan branch of Clann Domhnaill; and a sister who married Hugh Bisset.

The personal name Alasdair is a Gaelic equivalent of Alexander. Aonghus Mór, and his Clann Somhairle kinsman Eóghan Mac Dubhghaill, evidently named their eldest sons after the kings of Scotland. Both Eóghan's son, Alasdair Mac Dubhghaill, and Alasdair Óg himself, appear to have been named after Alexander III, King of Scotland as both are unlikely to have been born during the reign of the latter's father, Alexander II, King of Scotland. Before Alexander II, virtually no Scots are known to have borne the name Alexander. Very quickly, however, leading families within the Scottish realm began to emulate the royal family. The use of the name by leading members of Clann Somhairle appears to reflect the spread of Scottish influence into its own orbit, and could be evidence of the kindred's attempt to align itself closer to the Scottish Crown. (Note: The adoption of such names by the clan contrasts that of the neighbouring Crovan dynasty, a related kindred that retained its Scandinavian personal names.)

== Clann Domhnaill under Aonghus Mór ==
=== Hostage of the Scottish Crown ===
The seal of Alexander III. The device is similar to that of his English contemporaries, Henry III and Edward I.

In the midpoint of the thirteenth century, Alexander II, and his son and successor Alexander III, made several attempts to incorporate the Hebrides into the Scottish realm. Forming a part of the Kingdom of the Isles, these islands were a component of the far-flung Norwegian commonwealth. The independence of the Islesmen, and the lurking threat of their nominal overlord, the formidable Hákon Hákonarson, King of Norway, constituted a constant source of concern for the Scottish Crown. In 1261, Alexander III sent an embassy to Norway attempting to negotiate the purchase of the Isles from the Norwegian Crown. When mediation came to nought, Alexander III evidently orchestrated an invasion into the Isles as means to openly challenge his Norwegian counterpart's authority.

Thus provoked, Hákon assembled an enormous fleet to reassert Norwegian sovereignty along the north and west coasts of Scotland. Having rendezvoused with his vassals in the Isles—one of whom was Aonghus Mór himself—Hákon secured several castles, oversaw raids into the surrounding mainland. A series of inconclusive skirmishes upon the Ayrshire coast, coupled with ever-worsening weather, discouraged the Norwegians and convinced them to turn for home. Hákon died that December. As a result of his failure to break Scottish power, Alexander III seized the initiative the following year, and oversaw a series of invasions into the Isles and northern Scotland. Recognising this dramatic shift in royal authority, Magnús Óláfsson, King of Mann and the Isles submitted to the Scots within the year, and in so doing, symbolised the complete collapse of Norwegian sovereignty in the Isles.

In the wake of the Norwegian withdrawal, and the violent extension of Scottish royal authority into the Isles, Aonghus Mór had no choice but to submit to the Scots. He was forced to hand over his son—seemingly Alasdair Óg—who was consequently held at Ayr as a hostage of the Scottish Crown for Aonghus Mór's good behaviour. The fact that his son was accompanied by a nurse suggests that he was merely a young child at the time.

=== The Turnberry Band ===
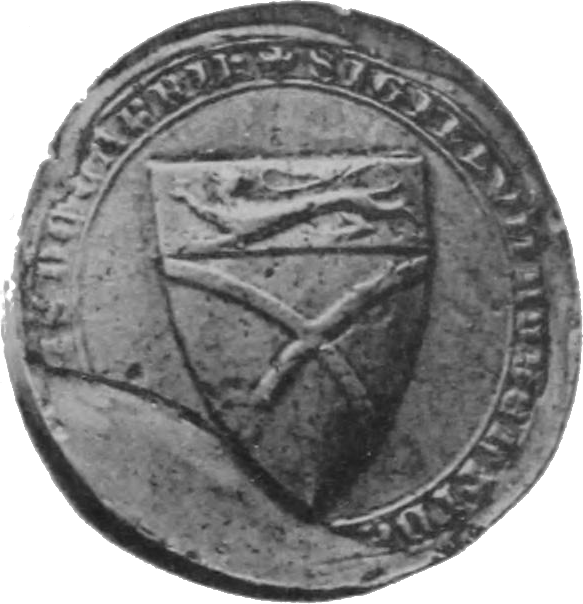
The seal of Robert Bruce VI. The Turnberry Band was concluded at this man's principal residence, Turnberry Castle.

Alasdair Óg next appears on record in about 1284/1285/1286, when he confirmed his father's grant of the church of St Ciarán to the Cistercian monastery of Paisley. The witness lists of Clann Somhairle charters spanning the thirteenth century reveal that, as time wore on, the kindred increasingly surrounded itself with men drawn from a Scottish background as opposed to that of men mainly of a Hebridean milieu. In fact, Alasdair Óg's transaction with the Cistercians marks the first record of Robert Bruce VII, a future King of Scotland. (Note: There is reason to suspect that Robert I had been fostered by a family in either Ireland or the west coast of Scotland. Candidates include Clann Domhnaill and Clann Ruaidhrí.)

Other evidence of the kindred's incorporation within Scotland concerns the formation of alliances with various factions within the realm. Whilst Clann Dubhghall forged ties with the dominant Comyn kindred, Clann Domhnaill evidently aligned itself to the Bruce kindred. The latter partnership appears to owe itself to the unsettled period immediately after Alexander III's unexpected demise in March 1286. Although the leading magnates of the realm had previously recognised Alexander III's granddaughter, Margaret, as his legitimate heir, there were two major factions in the realm that possessed competing claims to the kingship. At the beginning of April, Robert Bruce V, Lord of Annandale announced his claim to the throne, whilst John Balliol—a magnate backed by the Comyns—seems to have declared a claim of his own before the end of the month.

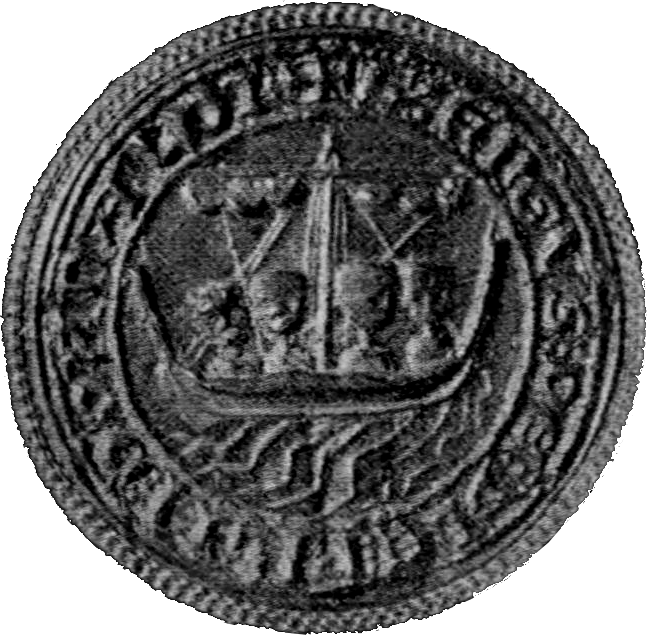
The seal of Alasdair Óg's father, Aonghus Mór. (Note: The device appears to be similar to that which was ascribed to Aonghus Mór's paternal grandfather in the fifteenth century. The seals of Alasdair Óg and Aonghus Mór are the earliest examples of heraldry utilised by Clann Domhnaill. The legend reads "S' ENGVS DE YLE FILII DOMNALDI", whilst the seal itself is blazoned on waves, a lymphad bearing four men, not on a shield.)

It is possible that the Bruce faction regarded its claim to be weaker to that of Comyn-Balliol faction. In September, members of the faction concluded a pact, known as the Turnberry Band, in which certain Scottish and Anglo-Irish magnates—including Alasdair Óg and his father—pledged to support one another. One possibility is that Alasdair Óg's confirmation charter was granted immediately before or after the conclusion of the Turnberry pact. Certainly, two of the men who witnessed the grant to Paisley were members of monastery of Crossraguel, a religious house within the Bruce lordship of Carrick. This could be evidence that the charter was issued within the earldom as well. In any event, although the precise purpose of the Turnberry pact is uncertain, it is conceivable that it was somehow connected to the Bruce faction's claim to the throne. One possibility is that that involvement of Clann Domhnaill may have been intended to counter the threat of Clann Dubhghaill whilst the Bruces and their allies contended with the Balliols in Galloway.

In accordance to the pact, the participating Scottish magnates swore to support two prominent Anglo-Irish magnates: Richard de Burgh, Earl of Ulster and Thomas de Clare, Lord of Thomond. Thomas' father-in-law died the same year leaving him with claims in Connacht and Ulster. This could indicate that one of the purposes of the bond was to further the ambitions of Richard and Thomas in north-west Ireland, and enable the latter to secure possession of his northern inheritance from the clutches of his chief competitor, John fitz Thomas, and the numerous native kindreds of the region. One aspect of the pact, therefore, could have concerned the curtailment of overseas connections between Clann Domhnaill and Irish kindreds opposed to the earl, such as the Uí Domhnaill and the Uí Néill. In fact, the bond coincided with an immense show of force by Richard in Connacht and Ulster. This campaign saw the earl's exaction of hostages from Cineál Chonaill and Cineál Eoghain, the deposition of Domhnall Ó Néill from the kingship of Tír Chonaill, and the subsequent replacement of the latter with a more palatable candidate. The bond's Anglo-Irish cosignatories may have sought maritime support from Clann Domhnaill, and it is possible that Aonghus Mór contributed to the earl's operation.

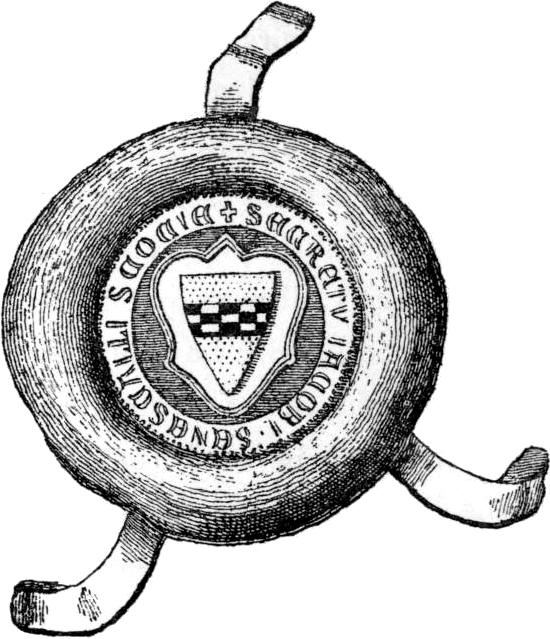
The seal of James Stewart, one of the cosignatories of the Turnberry Band, and Alasdair Óg's sometime opponent.

Other cosignatories included members of the Stewart/Menteith kindred. The Bruces and Stewarts also had a stake in north-west Ireland, with the latter kindred eventually possessing claims to territories that had formerly been held by predecessors of John Balliol. (Note: In time, both the Bruces and Stewarts would possess personal connections with the earl. By 1296, Richard was certainly a brother-in-law of James Stewart, Steward of Scotland—himself a party to the bond—whilst Richard became a father-in-law of Robert Bruce V's like-named grandson (a future King of Scotland) in 1304.) The participation of the Stewart/Menteith kindred in the band could have also concerned its part in the hostile annexation of the Clann Suibhne lordship in Argyll. Forced from its Scottish homeland, Clann Suibhne evidently found a safe haven in Tír Chonaill on account of an alliance forged with Domhnall Óg. Not only was the latter's son and successor, Aodh, the product of a union with a member of Clann Suibhne, but Domhnall Óg himself had been fostered by the kindred. The fact that Murchadh Mac Suibhne is known to have died imprisoned by Richard's father could in turn indicate that the earls of Ulster were opposed to Clann Suibhne's resettlement in the region. (Note: Murchadh is the first member of Clann Suibhne recorded in Ireland, and by the Irish annals.) Clann Domhnaill's part in Aodh's 1290 defeat at the hands of his paternal half-brother, Toirdhealbhach, meant that the forces of Clann Domhnaill were engaged supporting the cause of Aonghus Mór's maternal grandson (Toirdhealbhach) against a maternal descendant of Clann Suibhne (Aodh). Whether this clash was a direct result of the bond is uncertain, although it seems likely that Aonghus Mór's part in the pact concerned the value of his kindred's military might. Alasdair Óg may well have overseen Clann Domhnaill's overseas support of Toirdhealbhach. (Note: The notice of Clann Domhnaill's part in Aodh's defeat to Toirdhealbhach is the first specific record of the term "gallowglass" (gallóglach). Although this is certainly not the first time such overseas warriors were utilised in Ireland, it is the first time they are recorded to have been used to topple an Irish king.)

=== Under the Balliol regime ===
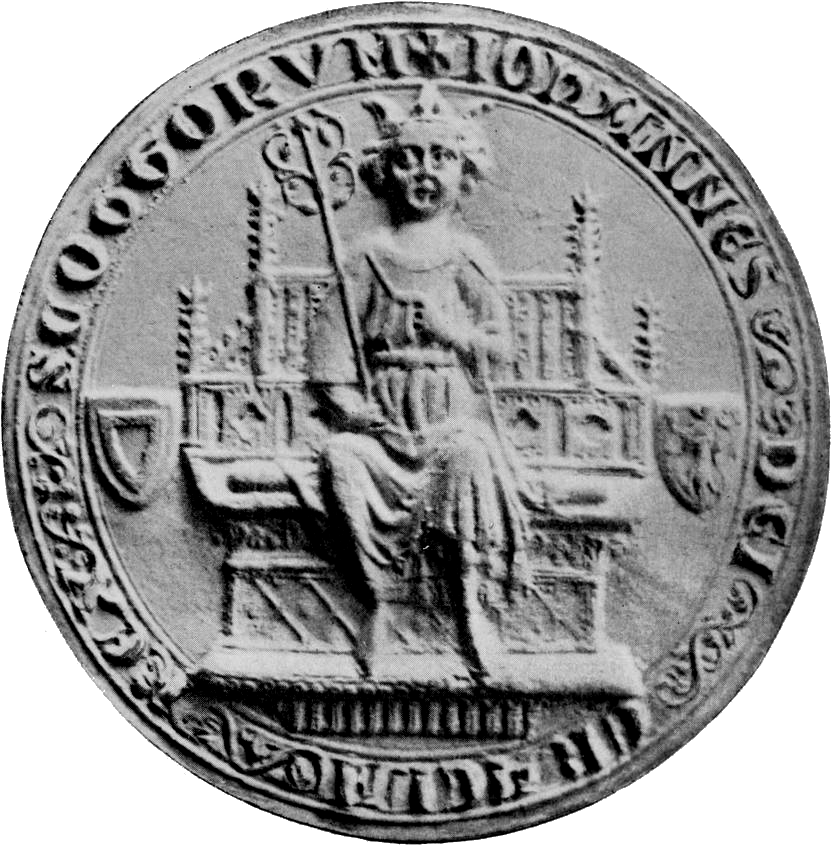
The seal of John, King of Scotland, a monarch closely connected with Alasdair Óg's neighbouring rival, Alasdair Mac Dubhghaill.

By the death of Alexander III, the Clann Domhnaill holdings seem to have included Kintyre, Islay, southern Jura, and perhaps Colonsay and Oronsay. Whilst Aonghus Mór is regularly described with a patronymic referring to his father, Alasdair Óg and Aonghus Óg tend to be accorded the territorial designation "of Islay". In 1292, the English Crown granted Aonghus Mór and Alasdair Óg safe conduct to travel and trade between Scotland and Ireland. 1292 is also the year in which a violent feud between Clann Domhnaill and Clann Dubhghaill is first attested. The infighting appears to have stemmed from Alasdair Óg's marriage to an apparent member of Clann Dubhghaill, and seems to have concerned a dispute over this woman's territorial claims. The parentage of Alasdair Óg's wife, Juliana, is unknown. Whilst she could have been a daughter or sister of the Clann Dubhghaill chief Alasdair Mac Dubhghaill, she certainly possessed a claim to a portion of Lismore.

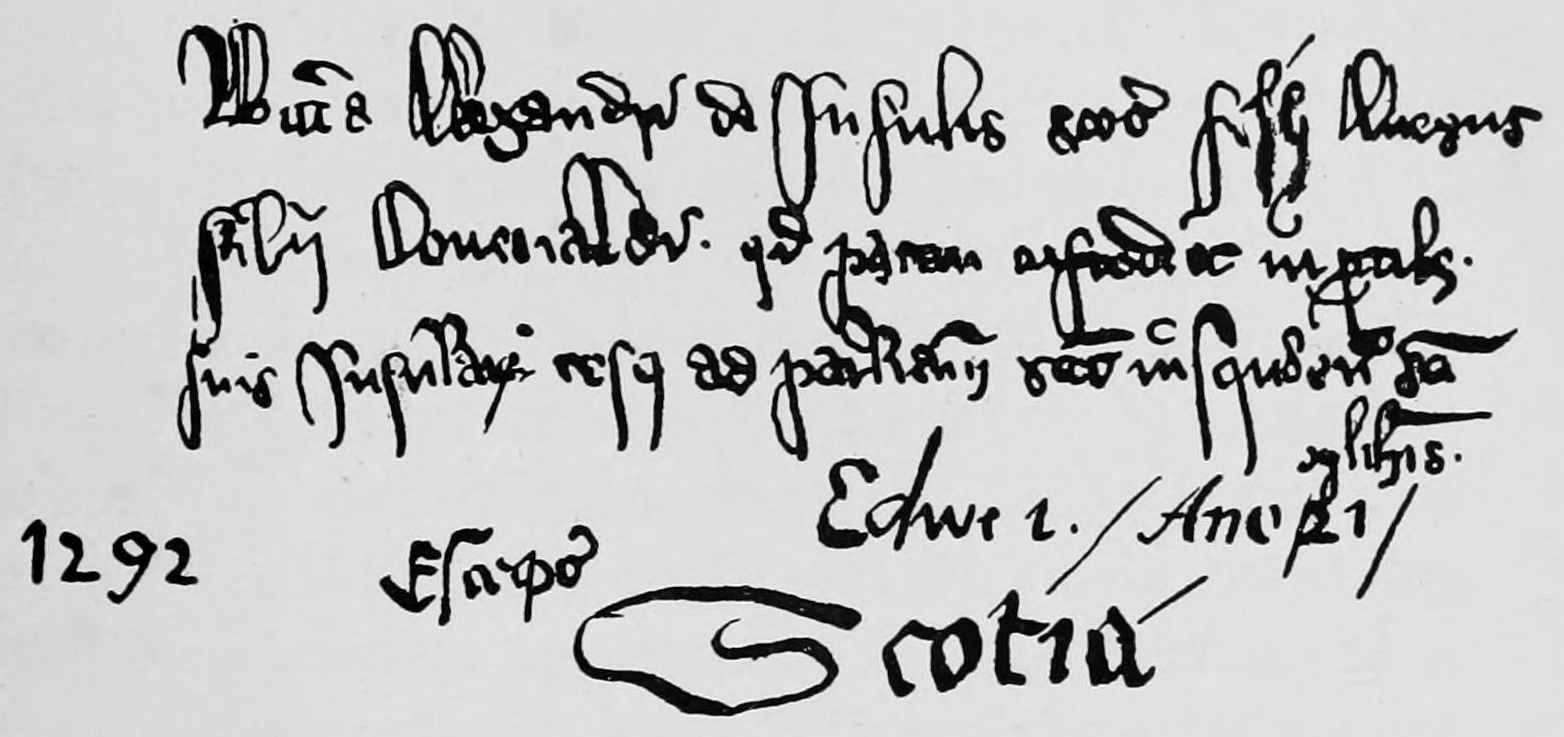
Image a

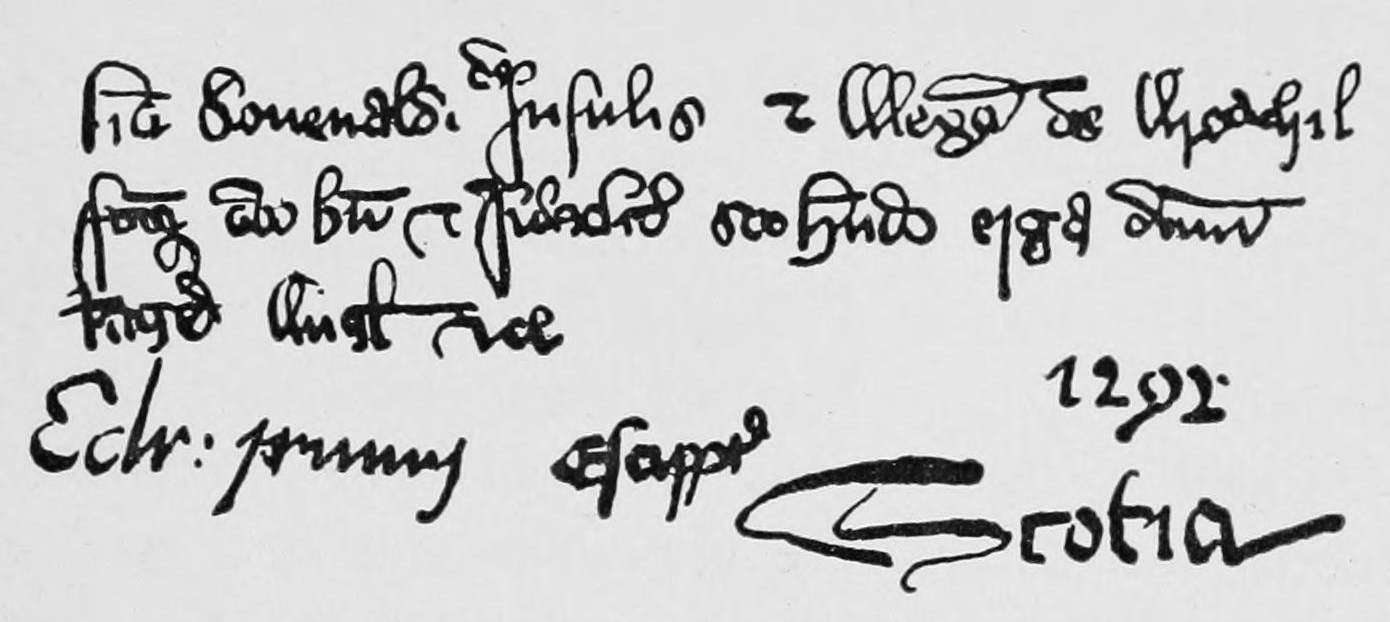
Image b

Facsimiles of correspondence between Clann Domhnaill and the English Crown: a letter from Aonghus Mór and Alasdair Óg (image a), and one which was attached to Alasdair Óg's seal (image b).

Although Aonghus Mór, Alasdair Óg, and Alasdair Mac Dubhghaill, swore to Edward I, King of England that they would postpone the feud, and pledged to uphold the peace in the "isles and outlying territories", the bitter internecine struggle continued throughout the 1290s. Edward directed that two of the Guardians of Scotland to be guarantors of the peace. One was the steward, whilst the other was John Comyn II, Lord of Badenoch. The fact that the latter was a brother-in-law of Alasdair Mac Dubhghaill could indicate that the steward and Clann Domhnaill were politically aligned.

In February 1293, at the first parliament of John, King of Scotland, three new sheriffdoms were erected in the western reaches of the realm. In the north-west, William II, Earl of Ross was made Sheriff of Skye, with a jurisdiction that appears to correspond to the territories formerly held by the Crovan dynasty before 1266. In the central-west, Alasdair Mac Dubhghaill was made Sheriff of Lorn, with a jurisdiction over much of Argyll. In the south-west, the steward was made Sheriff of Kintyre. The creation of these divisions dramatically evidences the steady consolidation of royal authority in the west in since 1266. (Note: Remarkably, representatives of Clann Domhnaill failed to attend the king's inaugural parliament. Only a few months later, Alasdair Mac Dubhghaill—the Scottish Crown's leading representative in the west—was commanded to bring Alasdair Óg's father and two other regional landholders to do homage before the king. Although it is unknown if Aonghus Mór obeyed the summons, the pledge by the barons of Argyll—to rise up against him in the event of his infidelity—may date to about this time. The document preserving the summons directed at Aonghus Mór describes him as a "miles" ("knight"), which could be evidence that he had been knighted. Unlike the latter, and certain other leading members of Clann Somhairle like Eóghan and Alasdair Mac Dubhghaill, Alasdair Óg is not addressed as a knight by any surviving source. Whilst it is certainly conceivable that he was knighted at some point in his career, clear corroborating evidence is nonexistent.) Despite the king's intentions of increased authority, stability, and peace, his new sheriffs seem to have used their elevated positions to exploit royal power against their own local rivals. Whereas Clann Ruaidhrí appears to have fallen afoul of the neighbouring Earl of Ross, Clann Domhnaill was forced to deal with its powerful Clann Dubhghaill rivals.

== Clann Domhnaill under Alasdair Óg ==
=== Aligned with the English regime ===
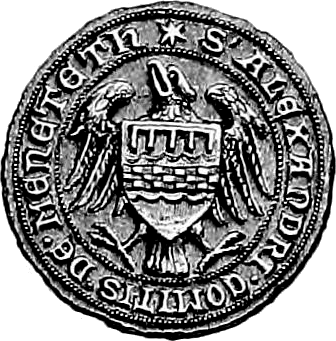
The seal of Alexander Stewart. Like Alasdair Óg, Alexander Stewart was employed by the English Crown against Clann Dubhghaill.

Aonghus Mór is last attested in 1293, and appears to have died at about this date. (Note: If Aonghus Mór was indeed dead by this date it would explain why there is no record of him swearing allegiance to the king.) Alasdair Óg's undated renewal of his father's grant of St Ciarán seems to be evidence that Aonghus Mór had been succeeded by the date of its issue. Certainly, Alasdair Óg appears to have succeeded Aonghus Mór by the mid 1290s. The record of Alasdair Óg serving as a young hostage in 1264 suggests that he would have been in his thirties at the time of his succession.

In an effort to curb the principal representative of the Comyn-Balliol faction in the north-west, Alasdair Mac Dubhghaill, Edward turned to Alasdair Óg. The latter was evidently serving the English Crown by March, and is attested in April as an English-aligned bailiff in Kintyre, tasked to seize control of Kintyre and hand it over to a certain Malcolm le fitz l'Engleys. As such, Alasdair Óg was given jurisdiction over an area formerly under the authority of the steward, a man who had briefly taken up arms against the English in 1296 but quickly capitulated when resistance proved futile.

By 10 September, however, Edward turned to Alexander Stewart, Earl of Menteith, who was appointed authority over an expansive territory stretching from Ross to Rutherglen. The earl was ordered to take into custody the property of Alasdair Mac Dubhghaill and Eóin Mac Dubhghaill; his was given authority over specific magnates such as the steward, (the keeper of Ross) William Hay, John Comyn II, and Niall Caimbéal; as well as the burghs of Ayr, Renfrew, Dumbarton; and given authority over the men of Argyll and Ross. It is unknown what prompted the king to turn towards the earl. The latter had been captured following the Scottish defeat at Dunbar in April, and had been released from custody in June. One possibility is that the English Crown sought to rely upon a power that was less personally involved in the politics of the region. It is also possible that the English orchestrated this delegation of authority in the context of adopting a divide-and-rule policy in the region as a way to offset Alasdair Óg's influence.

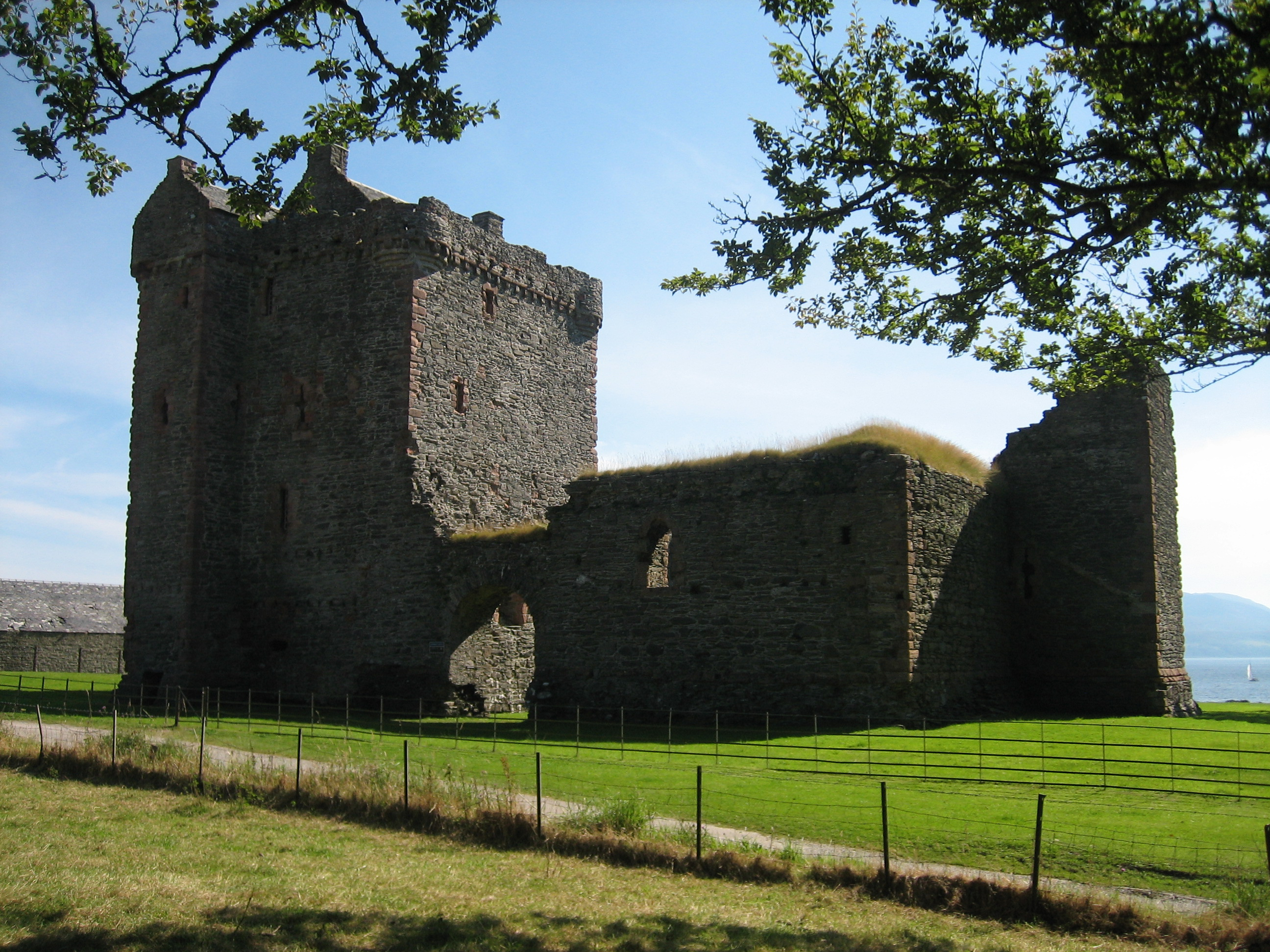
Either Skipness Castle (pictured) or Dunaverty Castle could have been the principal seat of the steward in Kintyre. Either may have been the fortress that Alasdair Óg was on verge of storming in September 1296 when he informed the English Crown of his progress in securing control of Kintyre.

In an undated letter that appears to date to about the summer of 1296, Alasdair Óg reported to the English king that he had secured possession of the steward's lands in Kintyre, and was on verge of taking control of a particular castle. Although this fortress is unnamed, it may have been either Dunaverty Castle of Skipness Castle—either of which could have been the steward's principal stronghold in Kintyre. Alasdair Óg also advanced the opinion that, under the Scottish and English law, no tenant-in-chief should lose his heritage without first being impleaded by writ in their name. However, the fact that Malcolm is on record in possession of Dunaverty Castle a decade later suggests that Alasdair Óg's letter was an insincere—and unsuccessful—attempt to prevent Malcolm from gaining a foothold in Kintyre. By early May, the steward duly submitted to the English Crown. Whether Alasdair Óg was aware of the steward's submition is unknown. As a result, his castle could have been seized by Alasdair Óg or merely handed over to him. In September 1296, Edward ordered that Alasdair Óg be granted £100 of lands and rent for his services to the English Crown.

=== Clann Somhairle kin-strife ===
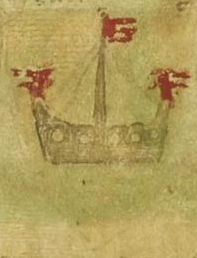
The arms of the Lord of Argyll depicted in the fourteenth-century Balliol Roll. (Note: The escutcheon is blazoned: or, a galley sable with dragon heads at prow and stern and flag flying gules, charged on the hull with four portholes argent. The coat of arms corresponds to the seal of Alasdair Mac Dubhghaill. Since the galley (also known as a lymphad) was a symbol of Clann Dubhghaill and seemingly Raghnall mac Somhairle—ancestor of Clann Ruaidhrí and Clann Domhnaill—it is conceivable that it was also a symbol of the Clann Somhairle progenitor, Somhairle mac Giolla Brighde. It was also a symbol of the Crovan dynasty, which could mean that it passed to Somhairle's family through his wife.)

It is evident that, from about 1296 to 1301, Clann Dubhghaill was out of favour of the English Crown. The efforts of Edward's adherents in Argyll were evidently successful since the next record of Alasdair Mac Dubhghaill reveals that the latter had been imprisoned at some point—presumably in an attempt to pacify his family—and was released by Edward in May 1297. (Note: Alasdair Mac Dubhghaill is recorded to have sworn allegiance to Edward in July 1296. Within the month as his release, Eóin Mac Dubhghaill was invited to partake in the king's campaign against the French in Flanders. It is possible that the former's presence was requested as a means to ensure the cooperation of his father. In any event, it appears that Eóin Mac Dubhghaill declined to accompany the English expedition.) With the Clann Dubhghaill chief's liberation, Edward may have hoped to reign in his disaffected son, Donnchadh, a man who—unlike his father—had not sworn allegiance to the English Crown, and who was evidently spearheading his family's resistance to Clann Domhnaill.

The struggle between Clann Domhnaill and Clann Dubhghaill is documented in two undated letters from Alasdair Óg to Edward. In the first, Alasdair Óg complained to the king that Alasdair Mac Dubhghaill had ravaged his lands. Although Alasdair Óg further noted that he had overcome Ruaidhrí Mac Ruaidhrí and thereby brought him to heel, the fealty that Ruaidhrí swore to the English Crown appears to have been rendered merely as a stalling tactic, since the letter reveals that Ruaidhrí's brother, Lachlann Mac Ruaidhrí, then attacked Alasdair Óg, and both of these Clann Ruaidhrí brothers proceeded to ravage Skye and Lewis and Harris. At the end of the letter, Alasdair Óg related that he was in the midst of organising a retaliatory operation, and implored upon Edward to instruct the other noblemen of Argyll and Ross to aid him in his struggle against the king's enemies. In a writ dated 9 April 1297, Edward ordered that the men of Argyll and Ross assist Alasdair Óg, who was thereby appointed as the king's bailiff in Lorn, Ross, and the Hebrides. As such, Alasdair Óg was granted authority in Alasdair Mac Dubhghaill's former sheriffdom. If the royal command was a response to Alasdair Óg's letter, as seems the case, it would suggest that he composed his correspondence to the king in the midpart of March.

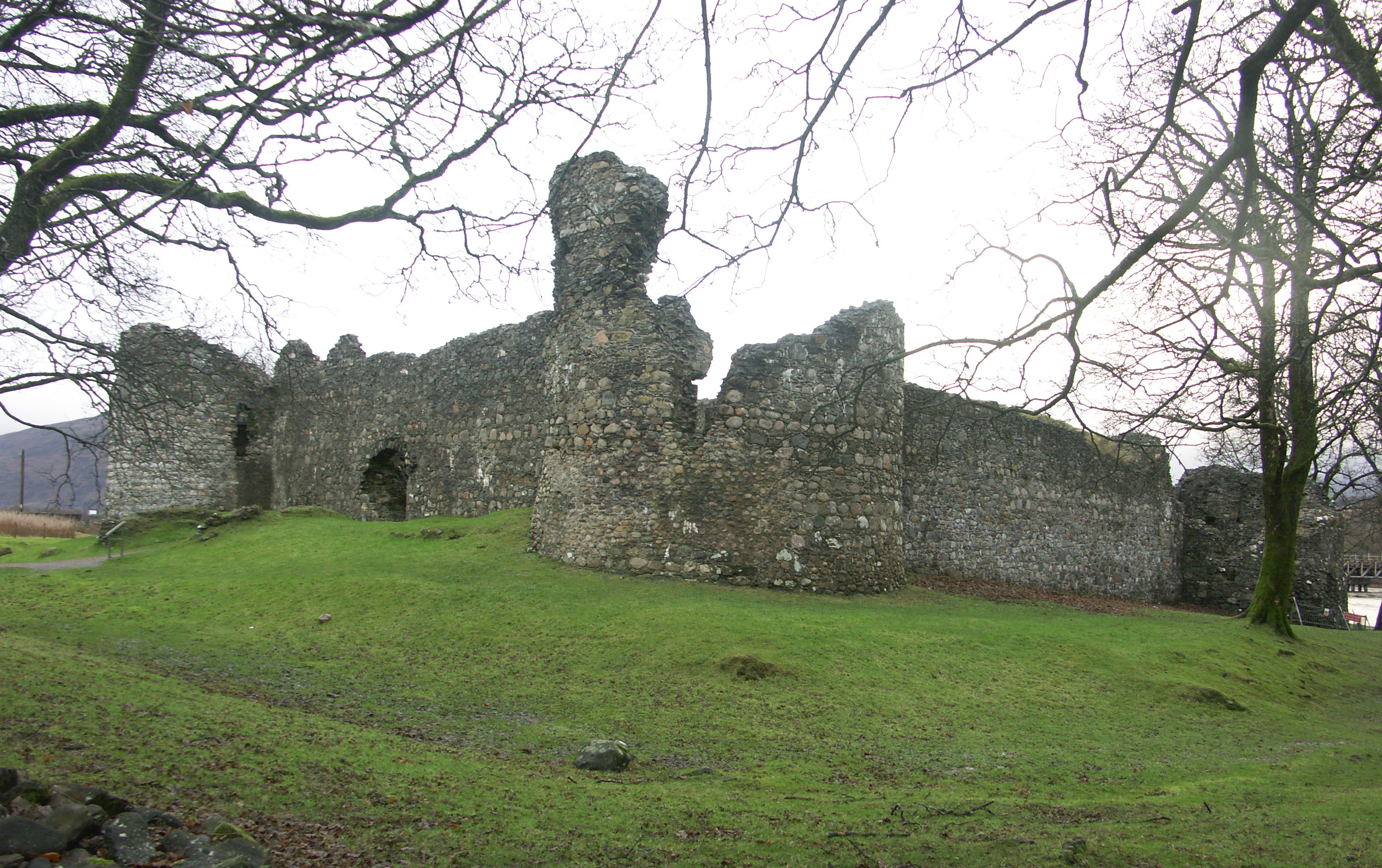
Now-ruinous Inverlochy Castle was once a stronghold of the Comyn kindred. In 1297, Alasdair Óg pursued his opponents to the castle, where he attempted to capture the largest warships on the western seaboard.

In the second letter, Alasdair Óg again appealed to the English Crown, complaining that he faced a united front from Donnchadh, Lachlann, Ruaidhrí, and the Comyns. According to Alasdair Óg, the men of Lochaber had sworn allegiance to Lachlann and Donnchadh. In one instance Alasdair Óg reported that, although he had been able to force Lachlann's supposed submission, he was thereupon attacked by Ruaidhrí. Alasdair Óg further related a specific expedition in which he pursued his opponents to the Comyn stronghold of Inverlochy Castle—the principal fortress in Lochaber—where he was unable to capture—but nevertheless destroyed—two massive galleys which he described as the largest warships in the Western Isles. (Note: As far as known, the largest Highland galleys were built on the mainland. The largest—a forty-oared vessel—appears on record within two decades in possession of Cailéan Óg Caimbéal (in the former Clann Dubhghaill lands of Loch Awe and Ardscotnish). A galley of this size would appear to have allowed the transport of over one hundred men upon command.) Alasdair Óg also reported that, on account of the steward's disloyalty to the king, he seized control of the castle and barony of "Glasrog" (probably Glassary). There is only one other reference to a castle in the barony of Glassary—presumably Fincharn Castle—in 1374. How the steward came to hold any authority in these Argyllian lands is uncertain. One possibility is that he capitalised upon the conflict between Clann Domhnaill and Clann Dubhghaill. In any event, much like in the first letter, Alasdair Óg called upon the English king for financial support in combating his mounting opponents. Specifically, he reminded the English Crown that he had received nothing of the £500 that he had been promised the year before, nor had he received any revenue from his duties as bailiff.

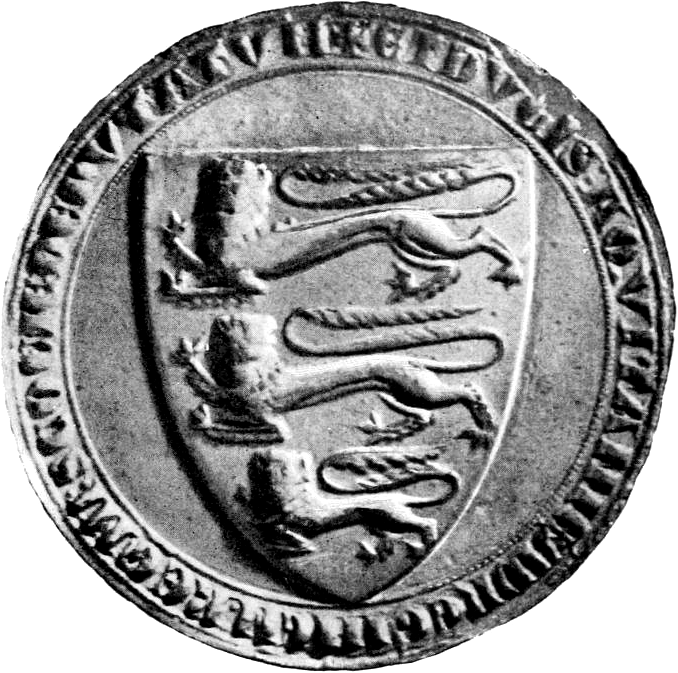
The seal that Alasdair Óg's English overlord, Edward I, used in Scotland in 1296–1306. (Note: The seal's legend reads "ET. DVCIS. AQUITANIE. AD. REGIMEN. REGNI. SOCIE. DEPVTATVM".)

Alasdair Óg's dispatches seem to show that Lachlann and Ruaidhrí were focused upon seizing control of Skye and Lewis and Harris from the absentee Earl of Ross. Whilst the first communiqué reveals that the initial assault upon the islands concerned pillage, the second letter appears to indicate that the islands were subjected to further invasions by Clann Ruaidhrí, suggesting that the acquisition of these islands was the family's goal. The bitter strife between Clann Ruaidhrí and Clann Domhnaill depicted by these letters seems to indicate that both kindreds sought to capitalise on the earl's absence, and that both families sought to incorporate the islands into their own lordships. In specific regard to Clann Ruaidhrí, it is likely this kindred's campaigning was an extension of the conflict originating from the creation of the shrievalty of Skye. The correspondence also reveals that the Lachlann and Ruaidhrí were able to split their forces and operate somewhat independently of each other. Although Alasdair Óg was evidently able to overcome one of the brothers at a time, he was nevertheless vulnerable to a counterattack from the other.

Alasdair Óg's second letter appears to date to after his reception of the king's writ of 9 April. Whether the Clann Somhairle kin-strife continued after Alasdair Mac Dubhghaill's May release is uncertain, although it would seem highly probable given the remarkable animosity between the concerned parties. If Edward did not intend for this liberated clan chief to reign in his family, another possibility is that his release was instead envisaged as a counterbalance to Alasdair Óg's power, to ensure that the latter was kept in check. The correspondence between Alasdair Óg and the English also reveals that, notwithstanding Edward's 1296 grant of administrative powers to Alexander Stewart in the northwest, it was actually Alasdair Óg who was implementing English royal authority in the region. Nevertheless, although Alasdair Óg was ostensibly working on the king's behalf, it is evident that local rivalries and self-interest laid behind the region's political alignments, not anti-Englishness. (Note: Edward appears to have enacted a similar policy in regard to contention between Alexander Comyn and John Strathbogie, Earl of Atholl, and between the latter and the Earl of Ross.) Certainly, the English Crown's elevation of Alasdair Óg at the expense of the steward and Clann Dubhghaill would have been a cause of apprehension and resentment. In fact, it is apparent that little authority could be expected by Edward without bringing these two disaffected parties onside.

=== Death ===
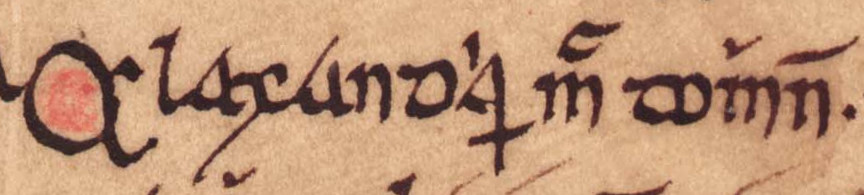
Alasdair Óg's apparent name as it appears on folio 71v of Oxford Bodleian Library Rawlinson B 489 (the Annals of Ulster). The excerpt forms part of the annal-entry recording his death at the hands of Alasdair Mac Dubhghaill.

In 1299, several Irish annals report a clash between Clann Domhnaill and Clann Dubhghaill in which Alasdair Mac Dubhghaill slew a member of Clann Domhnaill named Alasdair. (Note: These sources include the fifteenth- to sixteenth-century Annals of Connacht the sixteenth-century Annals of Loch Cé, the seventeenth-century Annals of the Four Masters, and the fifteenth- to sixteenth-century Annals of Ulster.) According to the seventeenth-century Annals of the Four Masters, this man was "the best man of his tribe in Ireland and Scotland for hospitality and prowess"; whilst the fifteenth- to sixteenth-century Annals of Ulster states that he was killed "together with a countless number of his own people ... around him". The slain man appears to have been Alasdair Óg himself. The accounts of his demise suggest that his final fall took place in the context of his ongoing dispute with Clann Dubhghaill.

[Note: According to the annals of Clan Donald, Alasdair Og (Alexander of Islay) was fighting against Robert the Bruce in 1308 in Galloway where he was defeated on the banks of the Dee by Edward, brother of King Robert the Bruce. Edward took prisoner "the prince of the Isles" but Alexander escaped to Castle Sween in Knapdale. Edward pursued him and captured Alexander there. He was taken to Dundonald Castle in Ayrshire where he was held prisoner and died soon after.] But this is widely disputed.

If the seventeenth-century Ane Accompt of the Genealogie of the Campbells is to be believed, Clann Dubhghaill successfully dispatched another rival during the 1290s, as this source claims that Eóin Mac Dubhghaill overcame and slew Cailéan Mór Caimbéal. The latter's death took place after his recognition as bailiff of Loch Awe and Ardscotnish by Edward in September 1296, suggesting that he too was employed by the English against Clann Dubhghaill. (Note: The notice of Cailéan Mór possessing the bailiary is the first record of the Caimbéalaigh (the Campbells) holding authority in Loch Awe.) Accordingly, both Alasdair Óg and Cailéan Mór appear to have succumbed to Clann Dubhghaill whilst attempting to extend Edward's authority into Argyll and bring the clan to heel. (Note: The record of Alasdair Óg's fall may also be the first certain attestation of the Clann Dubhnaill surname. If Alasdair Óg is not identical to the man slain by Clann Dubhghaill in 1299, another candidate may be his uncle, Alasdair Mór.)

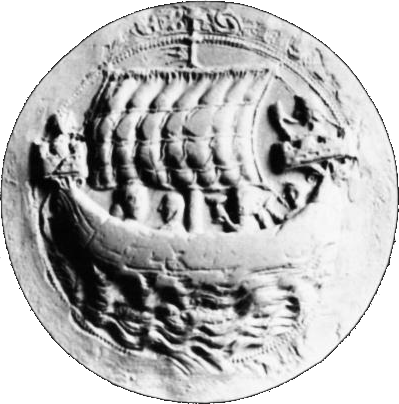
The Dublin city seal of 1297. The Clann Domhnaill seals show no trace of the forecastle and aftercastle depicted upon this device, indicating that the galleys utilised by the Highlanders and Hebrideans were smaller than vessels used elsewhere in Britain and Ireland. (Note: There is no evidence that Hebridean galleys had forecastles, topcastles, or aftercastles. The closest evidence for Islesmen with vessels so-equipped is a passage preserved by the thirteenth- to fourteenth-century Chronicle of Mann which makes note of a vessel with upper and lower decks in 1238.)

Alasdair Óg's death in 1299 seems to account for the recorded actions of his younger brother, Aonghus Óg, against Clann Dubhghaill. (Note: The fact that the fourteenth-century historian John Barbour fails to make note of Alasdair Óg, as opposed to his brother Aonghus Óg, suggests that Alasdair Óg had indeed died by the turn of the century.) In either 1301 or 1310 for example, whilst in the service of the English Crown, Aonghus Óg inquired of the king as to whether he and Hugh were authorised to conduct military operations against Alasdair Mac Dubhghaill, and further entreated the king on behalf of Lachlann and Ruaidhrí—who were then aiding Aonghus Óg's English-aligned military forces—to grant the Clann Ruaidhrí brothers feu of their ancestral lands. Another letter—this one from Hugh to Edward—reveals that Hugh, Eóin Mac Suibhne, and Aonghus Óg himself, were engaged in maritime operations against Clann Dubhghaill that year. (Note: Although these letters of Aonghus Óg and Hugh are generally assumed to date to 1301, another letter associated with them concerns the continued English service of Hugh and Eóin Mac Suibhne. The fact that this piece of correspondence identifies John Menteith as an opponent of the English Crown suggests that all three may instead date to 1310.)

The fact that Aonghus Óg styled himself "of Islay" in his letter could be evidence that he was acting as chief of Clann Domhnaill, and that he succeeded Alasdair Óg as chief. Nevertheless, the precise succession of Clann Domhnaill is uncertain. For example, the record of a certain Domhnall in attendance of the 1309 parliament of Robert I, with the territorial designation "of Islay", could indicate that this particular man then held the chiefship. As with the succession, the identity of this man is uncertain. One possibility is that he was an elder brother of Aonghus Óg; other possibilities are that he was either a cousin of Alasdair Óg and Aonghus Óg, or else a son of either two. (Note: No extant genealogical source specifically accords Aonghus Mór and Alasdair Óg with a son named Domhnall. The fifteenth-century National Library of Scotland Advocates' 72.1.1 (MS 1467) appears to show that Alasdair Mór did have a son by this name. However, Domhnall of Islay is elsewhere recorded to have had a brother named Gofraidh, and whilst Alasdair Óg is recorded to have had a son by this name, Alasdair Mór is not.)

The name and title of a Clann Domhnaill dynast as they appear on folio 82v (part 2) of Royal Irish Academy P 6 (the Annals of the Four Masters). The annal-entry records this man's death in 1318 at Faughart. He could have been a son of Alasdair Óg, and appears to have occupied the chiefship at the time of his fall.

Further evidence of a contentious family succession may be the record of a certain Alasdair of the Isles, who received a grant of the former Clann Dubhghaill islands of Mull and Tiree from Robert I. This man could have been a son of Aonghus Óg, or else a nephew of the latter—presumably a son of Alasdair Óg himself. Certainly, Alasdair of the Isles's royal grant comprised former Clann Dubhghaill islands, a fact which could be evidence that he was indeed a son of Alasdair Óg, and possessed a claim to these territories by right of his maternal descent from Clann Dubhghaill. (Note: If Alasdair Óg was not slain in 1299, however, another possibility is that he himself is identical to Alasdair of the Isles.) Remarkably, this is no evidence of a royal charter to the lordship of Islay. This could reveal that, upon Alasdair Óg's death, the lordship was automatically inherited by a son, possibly Alasdair of the Isles. The latter may be identical to the apparent Clann Domhnaill chief slain in 1318 supporting the Bruce campaign in Ireland. The sixteenth-century Annals of Loch Cé records his name as "Mac Domnaill, ri Oirir Gaidheal". This source is mirrored by several other Irish annals, (Note: According to the same annal-entry, the slain Clann Domhnaill dynast is reported to have died along with a certain "Mac Ruaidhri ri Innsi Gall". Sources that mirror this annal-entry include the Annals of Connacht, the Annals of the Four Masters, the Annals of Ulster, and the seventeenth-century Annals of Clonmacnoise.) and the eleventh- to fourteenth-century Annals of Inisfallen seems to refer to the same man, calling him "Alexander M" in an only partially-decipherable entry. The albeit exaggerated title "King of Argyll" accorded to this slain Clann Domhnaill dynast appears to exemplify the catastrophic effect that the rise of the Bruce regime had on its opponents like Clann Dubhghaill. Until its downfall in 1309, Clann Dubhghaill was closely associated with the lordship of Argyll. In consequence, this Argyllian title could be evidence that a son of Alasdair Óg possessed the inheritance of both Clann Domhnaill and Clann Dubhghaill.

== Descendants ==
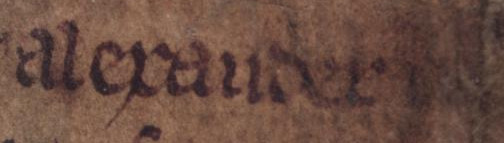
The partially-decipherable name of "Alexander M" as it appears on folio 57r of Oxford Bodleian Library Rawlinson B 503 (the Annals of Inisfallen). This man was slain campaigning in Ireland in 1318, and appears to have been chief of Clann Domhnaill. He could be identical to Alasdair of the Isles, and a son of Alasdair Óg.

Alasdair Óg is the eponymous ancestor of the Clann Alasdair branch of Clann Domhnaill. (Note: This family is also known as Clan Alexander, Clann Alaxandair, Clann Alexandair, and Clann Alasdair Mhic Dhomhnaill.) Surviving genealogical sources reveal that he had at least six sons: Eóin Dubh, Raghnall, Toirdhealbhach, Aonghus, Gofraidh, and Somhairle. Following his death, Alasdair Óg's sons evidently established themselves as gallowglass commanders in Ireland. In fact, three are recorded as commanders in contemporary Irish annalistic sources, and all founded prominent Irish gallowglass families. As such, Alasdair Óg's descendants formed the major gallowglass families of Clann Domhnaill. (Note: For example, Eóin Dubh (attested in 1349), Raghnall (attested in 1366), and Toirdhealbhach (attested in 1365 and 1366).) The first to be recorded in such a capacity is Eóin Dubh, a man whose violent demise is reported in 1349.

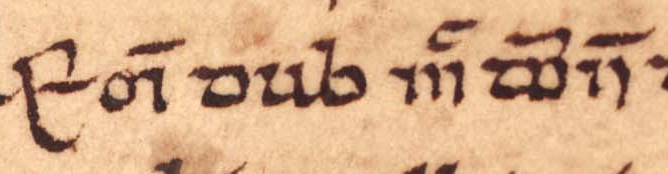
The name of Alasdair Óg's son, Eóin Dubh, as it appears on folio 76v of Oxford Bodleian Library Rawlinson B 489. Eóin Dubh's son, Somhairle, was Constable of Ulster, and was described as heir to the kingship of the Hebrides in 1365. Eóin Dubh's brother, Raghnall, was described as heir of Clann Alasdair in 1366.

Other than Alasdair of the Isles, another possible son of Alasdair Óg is Ruaidhrí of Islay, a man who suffered the forfeiture of his possessions by Robert I in 1325. The parentage of this man is uncertain, and it is conceivable that was a member of either Clann Ruaidhrí or Clann Domhnaill. The downfall of Alasdair Óg's lineage in the Clann Domhnaill heartland seems to account for the kindred's relocation to Ireland as mercenary commanders. If Ruaidhrí of Islay was indeed a member of Clann Domhnaill, and a son of Alasdair Óg, his expulsion may have marked the downfall of Clann Alasdair in Scotland, and may account for the fact that Alasdair Óg's descendants failed to hold power in Hebrides after this date. As such, Ruaidhrí of Islay's expulsion could well mark the date upon which Clann Alasdair relocated overseas. Another family descended from Alasdair Óg is probably Clann Alasdair of Loup in Kintyre. (Note: The first record of this clan's surname appears to be that of Alasdair Óg's grandson, Gofraidh mac Aonghusa, who—along with his own son, Eóin—is accorded a surname referring to Alasdair Óg in a papal document dating to 1395. The seventeenth-century Sleat History attributes another origin of Clann Alasdair of Loup, stating that the family's projenitor was Alasdair, an illegitimate son of Aonghus Óg.)

The eclipse of Alasdair Óg's line—the senior branch of Clann Domhnaill—may explain the rise of Aonghus Óg's line. If Ruaidhrí of Islay indeed represented the line of Alasdair Óg by 1325, his forfeiture evidently paved the way for the rise of Aonghus Óg's son, Eóin. In fact, before the end of Robert I's reign, this Eóin appears to have administered Islay on behalf of the Scottish Crown, and eventually came to style himself Lord of the Isles.

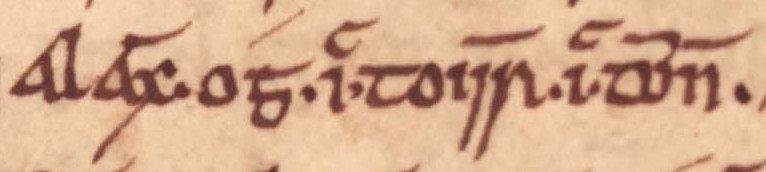
The name of Alasdair Óg's like-named grandson, Alasdair Óg mac Toirdhealbhaigh, as it appears on folio 78v of Oxford Bodleian Library Rawlinson B 489. This man was Constable of Ulster, and was described as heir of Clann Domhnaill.

Some of the accounts of Alasdair Óg, preserved by seventeenth-century Sleat History, have little in common with the man recorded by other, more contemporary and perhaps more accurate accounts. For example, according to the Sleat History, Alasdair Óg was "always" an enemy of Robert I, and consistently fought alongside Eóin Mac Dubhghaill against this king. At one point, Alasdair Óg is said to have been besieged by the king within Castle Sween, where he was captured and later died there as a prisoner, however, the better reasoned view is that he was always loyal to the Bruces. His younger brother, Aonghus Óg, likewise always supported Robert I in "all his wars". (Note: The account of Alasdair Óg at Castle Sween may be related to the equally erroneous account of Eóin Mac Dubhghaill preserved by the fourteenth-century Bruce, a source which claims that Robert I imprisoned this man in Loch Leven Castle where he died.) This skewed view of Alasdair Óg seems to have been constructed as a means to glorify the branch of Clann Domhnaill descended from Aonghus Mor's younger brother Alasdair Mor at the expense of Alasdair Óg and his reputation. As such, the history of the Clann Alasdair branch of the clan is ignored by the Sleat History.
