= Aonghus Mór =

Scottish nobleman

Aonghus Mór mac Domhnaill
- Lord of Islay
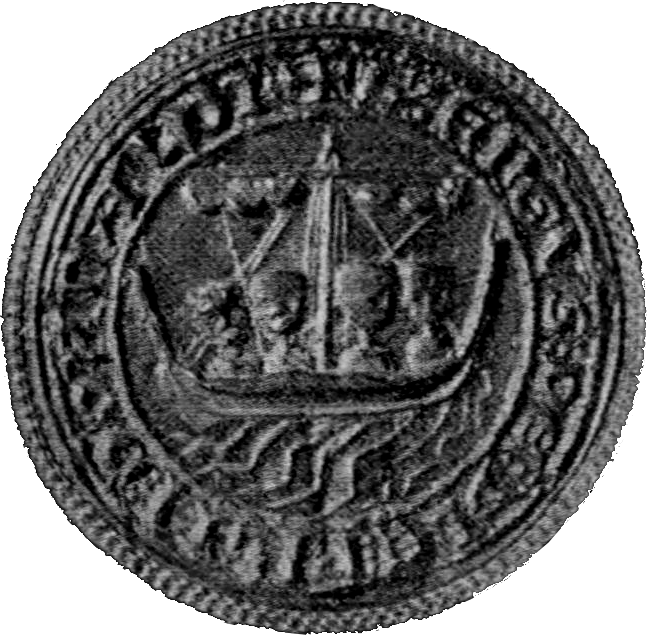
- The seal of Aonghus Mór. (Note: The seal appears to be similar to that which was ascribed to his paternal grandfather in the fifteenth century. The seals of Aonghus Mór, and his son Alasdair Óg, are the earliest examples of heraldry utilised by Clann Domhnaill. The legend reads "S' ENGVS DE YLE FILII DOMNALDI", whilst the seal itself is blazoned on waves, a lymphad bearing four men, not on a shield.)
- Successor: Alasdair Óg Mac Domhnaill
- Died: c. 1293
- Noble family: Clann Domhnaill
- Issue: Alasdair Óg, Aonghus Óg, Eóin Sprangach
- Father: Domhnall mac Raghnaill

Aonghus Mór mac Domhnaill (died c. 1293) was a leading figure in the thirteenth-century kingdoms of the Isles and Scotland. (Note: Since the 1980s, academics have accorded Aonghus Óg various patronyms in English secondary sources: Aenghus Mor Mac Domhnall, Aengus mac Domnaill, Áengus mac Domnall, Áengus mac Domnaill, Aengus Mór mac Domnaill, Áengus Mór mac Domnaill, Aengus Mór MacDomhnaill, Angus fitz Donald, Angus Mac Donald, Angus MacDonald, Angus Macdonald, Angus Mór Mac Donald, Angus Mor mac Donald, Angus Mor MacDonald, Angus Mór Macdonald, Angus Mór MacDonald, Angus Mor macDonald, Angus Mor Macdonald, Aonghas Mór Mac Domhnaill, Aonghas Mór MacDhomhnaill, Aonghas Mòr MacDhòmhnaill, Aonghus mac Domhnaill, Aonghus mac Domnaill, Aonghus Mór Mac Dhómhnaill, Aonghus Mór mac Domhnaill, Aonghus Mór Mac Domhnaill, and Aongus mac Domnaill.) He was a son of Domhnall mac Raghnaill, the eponym of Clann Domhnaill, a branch of Clann Somhairle. Aonghus Mór appears to have succeeded his father in the mid part of the thirteenth century. At the time, the rulers of the Isles were fiercely independent of the Scottish Crown, and owed nominal allegiance to the distant Norwegian Crown. Aonghus Mór's first certain appearance in the historical record seems to evince his involvement in aiding native Irish kindreds against the consolidation of Anglo-Irish authority in the north-west of Ireland. Such cooperation could have been undertaken in the context of overseas kindreds like Clann Domhnaill constructing Irish alliances to gain assistance against Scottish encroachment.

Scottish aggression against the Isles seems to have precipitated the Norwegian Crown's campaign against the Scots in 1263. Like other leading members of Clann Somhairle, Aonghus Mór supported the Norwegian cause against Alexander III, King of Scotland. However, the fact that Hákon Hákonarson, King of Norway had to force Aonghus Mór's submission, suggests that his support was rendered somewhat grudgingly. Nevertheless, the Norwegian campaign was ultimately a failure, and the Islesmen were compelled to submit to the Scots after a retaliatory campaign the following year. As for Aonghus Mór, he was forced to hand over his son, likely Alasdair Óg, as a hostage of the Scottish Crown. By 1266, the Isles were officially annexed by the Scots.

In the decades that followed, Aonghus Mór and his Clann Somhairle kinsmen integrated themselves into the Scottish realm. For example, Aonghus Mór was one of three members of the kindred to attend an important government council at Scone in which Alexander III's granddaughter, Margaret, was recognised as the king's rightful heir. Following Alexander III's unexpected death two years later, Aonghus Mór and Alasdair Óg were signatories of the Turnberry Band, a pact between several Scottish and Anglo-Irish magnates. One aspect of this bond may have concerned the continued resistance to Anglo-Irish domination in north-west Ireland. This could indicate that Aonghus Mór was made a party to the pact as a means of limiting his kindred's support of the native opponents of the Anglo-Irish. Whatever the case, Aonghus Mór died in about 1293, and was succeeded by Alasdair Óg as Lord of Islay. Aonghus Mór was married to a member of the Caimbéalaigh kindred. Besides Alasdair Óg, Aonghus Mór had two sons, Aonghus Óg and Eóin Sprangach. He also had a daughter who married Domhnall Óg Ó Domhnaill, King of Tír Chonaill, and another who married Hugh Bisset.

== Clann Domhnaill ==
Aonghus Mór was a son of Domhnall mac Raghnaill, eponym of Clann Domhnaill. As such, Aonghus Mór can be regarded as the first Mac Domhnaill. Clann Domhnaill was the junior-most of three main branches of Clann Somhairle. The other two branches were Clann Dubhghaill and Clann Ruaidhrí, respectively descended from (Domhnall's uncle) Dubhghall mac Somhairle and (Domhnall's elder brother) Ruaidhrí mac Raghnaill. According to oral tradition dating to the eighteenth century, Aonghus Mór was fostered by the eponymous ancestor of Clann Duibhshíthe. The date of Domhnall's death and Aonghus Mór's succession is unknown, although the latter was certainly representing the family by 1260s, seemingly indicating that the former was dead or retired by this time.

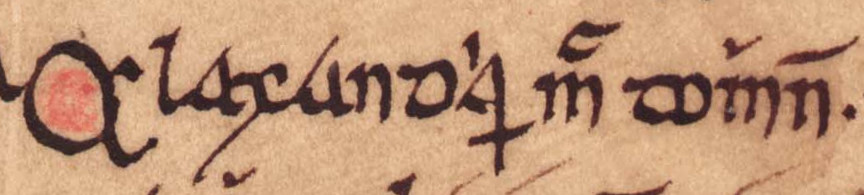
The apparent name of Alasdair Óg as it appears on folio 71v of Oxford Bodleian Library Rawlinson B 489 (the Annals of Ulster).

Aonghus Mór was married to a member of the Caimbéalaigh kindred (the Campbells). According to early modern tradition preserved by the seventeenth-century Sleat History, she was a daughter of Cailéan Mór Caimbéal, a leading member of the Caimbéalaigh, and the mother of Aonghus Mór's younger son, Aonghus Óg. (Note: Aonghus Mór's marriage is not recorded by traditional Caimbéalaigh genealogies. Aonghus Mór's epithet Mór is attributed to him by the fifteenth-century National Library of Scotland Advocates' 72.1.1 (MS 1467). The Gaelic Óg and Mór mean "young" and "big" respectively.) Like his Clann Somhairle kinsman, Eóghan Mac Dubhghaill, Aonghus Mór evidently named his first-born son, Alasdair Óg, after Alexander III, King of Scotland. (Note: The personal name Alasdair is a Gaelic equivalent of Alexander.) The kindred's adoption of this royal name appears to be indicative of the spread of Scottish influence into Isles, and could be evidence of the family's attempt to align itself closer to the Scottish Crown. (Note: Clann Somhairle's employment of the name contrasts the continued preference of Scandinavian names borne by the neighbouring Crovan dynasty, a family that also held authority along Scotland's western seaboard.)

A daughter of Aonghus Mór married Domhnall Óg Ó Domhnaill, King of Tír Chonaill. Another married Hugh Bisset. Alasdair Óg was the progenitor of several prominent Clann Domhnaill gallowglass families in Ireland, the eponymous ancestor of the Clann Alasdair branch of Clann Domhnaill, and probably of the like-named Kintyre branch of Clann Domhnaill. Another son, Eóin Sprangach, was the ancestor of the Ardnamurchan branch of Clann Domhnaill. There is evidence to suggest that Aonghus Mór may have had yet another son, named Domhnall. Although various historical records and chronicle-accounts concerning the period make note of this man, with some of these sources styling him "of Islay", the precise identity of this individual is uncertain.

A seventeenth-century pedigree of the Ó Gnímh bardic kindred of Ulster traces its descent from a son of Aonghus Mór named Gofraidh. The familial origins of this kindred are uncertain. Whilst it is possible that the family is a branch of Clann Domhnaill, there is also reason to suspect that a genealogical connection between the families was concocted. (Note: Another seventeenth-century pedigree states that the Ó Gnímh family descended from a grandson of Aonghus Mór's brother, Alasdair Mór.)

According to the seventeenth-century Macintosh History, an ancestor of Clann Mhic an Tóisigh named Fearchar married a daughter of Aonghus Óg named "Moram". The fact that Fearchar is supposed to have died in 1274, however, suggests that this source has conflated Aonghus Óg and Aonghus Mór. (Note: According to the Sleat History, an illegitimate daughter of Aonghus Mór was the mother of an early chiefly ancestor of Clann Mhic an Tóisigh. The father of this ancestor is stated to have fled to Aonghus Mór whilst on the run for committing manslaughter. Having fathered a son with Aonghus Mór's daughter, the man is then said to have campaigned with Edward Bruce, Earl of Carrick in Ireland where he was slain. The Sleat History also claims that the slain man's son—the ancestor of later Clann Mhic an Tóisigh chiefs—was brought up in Clann Domhnaill territory and endowed by the kindred with lands in Lochaber and Moray. Whatever the case, there is no solid evidence of Clann Mhic an Tóisigh in the Lochaber region before the reign of Robert II, King of Scotland (reign 1371–1390).) . Alexander Mackintosh Shaw (1880) confirms the father of Moran to be Aonghus Mór; "Ferquhard's intercourse with the fair Mora of Isla was at first of an unauthorised character, and that, this being discovered, the lover fled to avoid the wrath of the powerful father. He took refuge in Ireland, but before he had been there long he was recalled, and on his return made Mora his wife."

== Early career ==
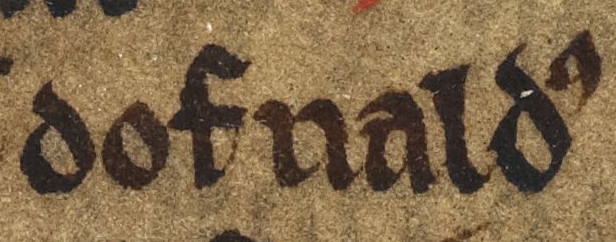
The apparent name of Domhnall mac Raghnaill as it appears on folio 47v of British Library Cotton Julius A VII (the Chronicle of Mann): "Dofnaldus".

=== Attestations of uncertain date ===
Unlike some of his Clann Somhairle kinsmen, there is little known of Aonghus Mór's career. Details of his father's life are even more obscure. One source that may cast light upon the latter—and potentially concern Aonghus Mór himself—is the thirteenth- to fourteenth-century Chronicle of Mann. According to this source, an aged chieftain named "Dofnaldus" was held in high esteem by Haraldr Óláfsson, King of Mann and the Isles, but after the latter's unexpected death, and the subsequent assassination of his brother Rǫgnvaldr Óláfsson, the kingship was seized by their rival kinsman Haraldr Guðrøðarson (reigned 1249–1250), who in turn had Dofnaldus and his infant son imprisoned. The episode concerning Dofnaldus concludes with him and his son successfully escaping their captors through divine intervention, and the compiler of the chronicle stating that the recorded events were provided in person by the chieftain in question. There is reason to suspect that Dofnaldus and his infant son are identical to Domhnall and possibly Aonghus Mór himself. Haraldr Óláfsson certainly associated himself with the Hebrides throughout his reign, a fact which could in turn indicate that the chieftains whom he had held in highest esteem were indeed Hebrideans.

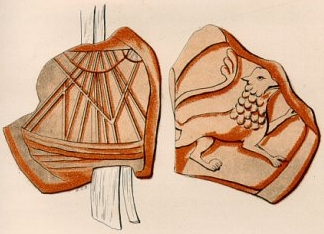
The seal of Haraldr Óláfsson, King of Mann and the Isles. The device depicts a sailing vessel on one side similar to that of Aonghus Mór. To the rulers of the Isles, such vessels were symbols of power and authority.

There are several charters that may have bearing upon Aonghus Mór's early career. At some point he issued several undated charters to the monastery of Paisley. One of these was a payment and promise of protection to the monks of this religious house, not unlike an earlier grant by his paternal grandfather, Raghnall mac Somhairle. Aonghus Mór's other charter concerned his grant of the church of St Ciarán in Kintyre to the monastery. (Note: Despite the fact that nothing remains of the church itself, its name is preserved in the place name Kilkerran. Although one particular charter to the monastery of Paisley appears to be that of Aonghus Mór's father, Domhnall, the fact that it is nearly identical to that of this man's father—and even features an identical witness list—could indicate that Domhnall's charter was either granted at the same time as his father's, or else be evidence of its lack of authenticity. These charters of Domhnall and Raghnall contain a curse to St Columba, although this saint is not mentioned Aonghus Mór's corresponding charter. This could indicate that the cult of St Columba was waning by Aonghus Mór's floruit. The various grants to the monastery of Paisley may relate to the fact the kindred's eponymous ancestor, Somhairle mac Giolla Brighde, was killed near the region of this religious house, and the possibility that his body was looked after by its monks.) This particular charter refers to both a king and prince named Alexander. Although these two can be understood to refer to Alexander II and his son and successor, Alexander III—an identification that would date the endowment to 1241×1249—another possibility is that the names instead refer to the latter and his like-named son, Alexander. If this latter identification is indeed correct, the charter would instead date to 1264×1284. The grant itself stresses that the transaction was made "for the welfare of my lord Alexander, illustrious king of Scots" ("pro salute domini mei Alexandri illustris regis Scotie"), a declaration that may be evidence that Aonghus Mór was attempting to align himself with the Scottish Crown.

=== Involvement in Irish affairs ===
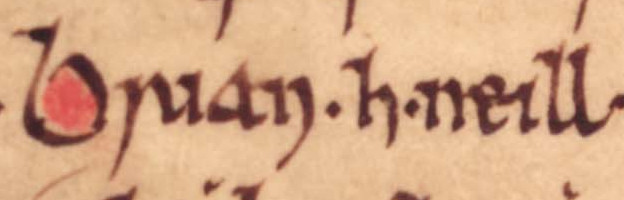
The name of Brian Ó Néill as it appears on folio 68r of Oxford Bodleian Library Rawlinson B 489.

The first certain record of Aonghus Mór in contemporary sources dates to February 1256, when the English Crown commanded that he, and other unnamed men from Scotland, were not to be received in Ireland. In the mid thirteenth century, leading members of Clann Somhairle were clearly involved in Irish affairs. In 1247, a certain Mac Somhairle was slain whilst resisting an English invasion of Tír Chonaill. Dubhghall raided western Ireland and slew the English Sheriff of Connacht in 1258. The year after that, a daughter of Dubhghall married Aodh na nGall Ó Conchobhair, with the latter receiving the bride's tocher of one hundred and sixty gallowglass warriors commanded by Dubhghall's brother, Ailéan. The year before this, Aodh na nGall had been one of several leading Irishmen who relinquished their claims to the high-kingship of Ireland in favour of Brian Ó Néill, King of Tír Eoghain, a man committed to combating the Anglo-Irish in Ulster. Unfortunately for this group of Irish confederates, their combined forces were utterly crushed by the Anglo-Irish at Downpatrick in 1260, with Brian amongst the slain.

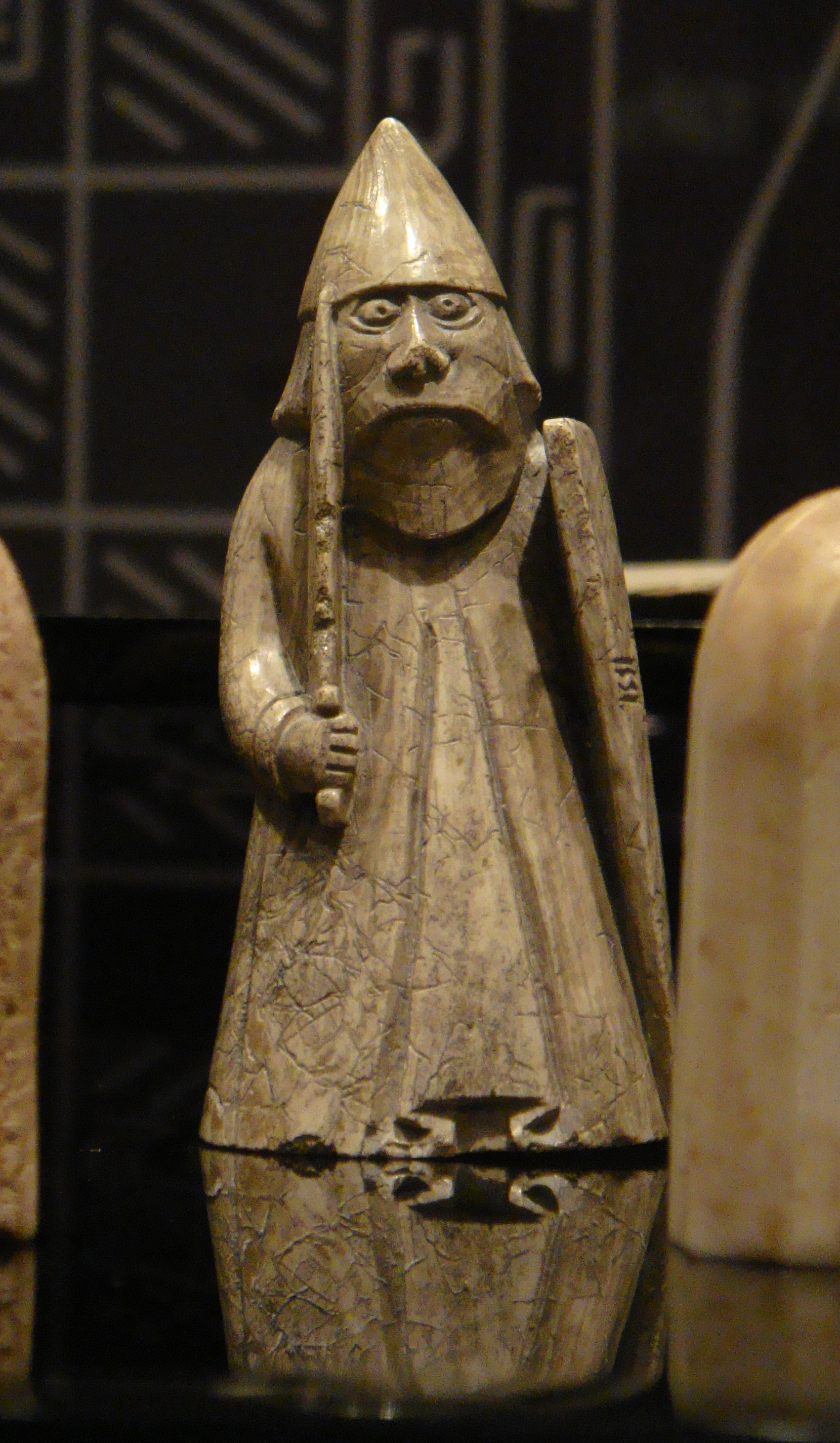
A rook gaming piece of the Lewis chessmen. The Scandinavian connections of leading members of the Isles may have been reflected in their military armament, and could have resembled that depicted upon such gaming pieces.

Whilst the Uí Conchobhair clearly enlisted Hebridean military assistance from Clann Ruaidhrí—with members of the kindred potentially present at the catastrophe at Downpatrick—it is apparent that the Cineál Chonaill also enjoyed connections with Clann Domhnaill, as a daughter of Aonghus Mór is known to have married the King of Tír Chonaill, Domhnall Óg. A product of this union was Toirdhealbhach Ó Domhnaill, a man who is recorded to have seized the kingship of Tír Chonaill from his reigning paternal half-brother, Aodh, by way of overseas military assistance from Clann Domhnaill in 1290. (Note: Aodh's mother was a member of Clann Suibhne. If much later tradition is to be believed, Brian also possessed personal connections with Clann Somhairle through his marriage to an apparent member of Clann Dubhghaill.) If Aonghus Mór had been involved with Brian and his insurrection, such a relationship could account for Aonghus Mór being singled out by the English ordinance of 1256. The fact that this directive stated that the Scottish king would name other figures to be denied access to Ireland could indicate that these men were regarded as threats by the Scottish Crown. Such could have been the case if alliances between Irishmen and Islesmen were undertaken in the context of lending mutual assistance to each other.

It is conceivable that the overseas support lent to the Irish insurrection was ventured in the context of not only countering the English Crown in Ireland, but of also opposing the westward extension of Scottish royal authority. In fact, another ordinance dating to just weeks before Brian's defeat—and almost certainly related to the uprising itself—directed the Anglo-Irish justiciar to arrest any Scottish subjects who were actively seeking confederacies with the Irish that might be to the king's detriment. (Note: Aonghus Mór is the subject of a remarkable piece of contemporary praise-poetry, and it is possible that his support of disaffected Irish kindreds could account for the piratical boasts contained within this composition. The poem itself seems to date to the mid part of the century, and appears to indicate that the unknown poet had earlier been commissioned to compose a similar panegyric for Aonghus Mór's father.) In the 1230s and 1240s, the Scottish Crown progressively attempted to expand its lordship into Argyll and the Isles. One example of this expansion that appears to have specifically concerned Aonghus Mór was the king's grant of the rights of the church of Killean to the Diocese of Argyll. Earlier in the century, this church had been under the patronage of Aonghus Mór's uncle, Ruaidhrí, and it is likely that Aonghus Mór himself considered its patronage as his own heritable prerogative.

== A Norwegian subject ==
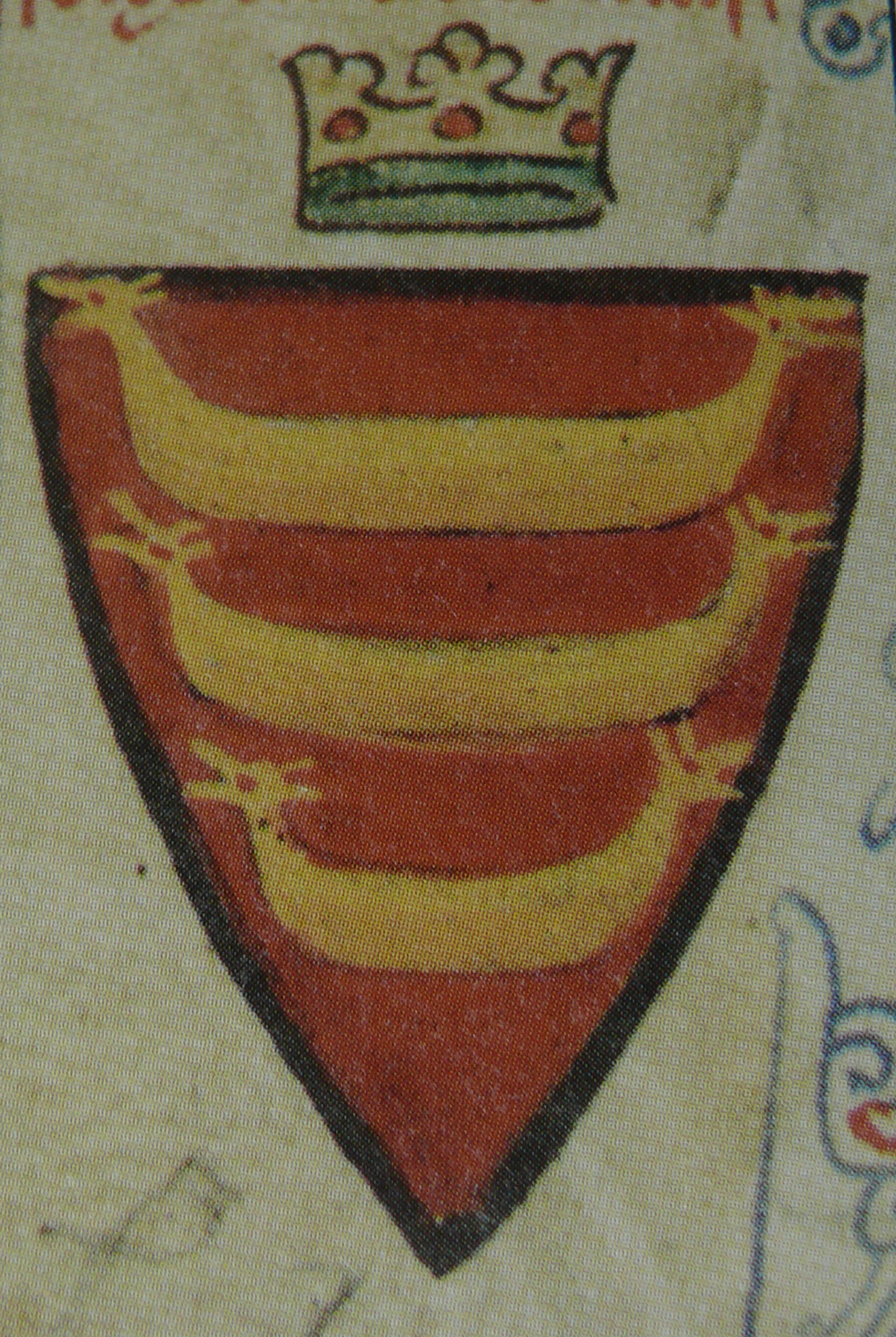
The arms of Hákon Hákonarson depicted on folio 216v of Cambridge Corpus Christi College Parker Library 16II (Chronica Majora). (Note: The escutcheon is blazoned: gules, three galleys with dragon heads at each end or, one above the other. The coat of arms concerns Hákon's coronation, and its associated caption reads in Latin: "Scutum regis Norwagiae nuper coronati, qui dicitur rex Insularum". The coat of arms was illustrated by Matthew Paris, a man who met Hákon in 1248/1249, the year after the king's coronation. The emphasise that Matthew placed upon the Norwegian realm's sea power appears to be underscored in the heraldry he attributed to Hákon.)

=== Clann Somhairle and the kingship of the Isles ===
In 1248, the year after the fall of Mac Somhairle, two leading members of Clann Somhairle travelled to Norway seeking the kingship of the northern Suðreyjar from Hákon Hákonarson, King of Norway. The two kinsmen were Eóghan Mac Dubhghaill and Dubhghall mac Ruaidhrí, chiefs of Clann Dubhghaill and Clann Ruaidhrí respectively. Although the entirety of the Suðreyjar roughly encompassed the Hebrides and Mann, the precise jurisdiction which Dubhghall and Eóghan competed for is uncertain. For instance, the northern Hebridean islands of Lewis and Harris and Skye appear to have been held by the Crovan dynasty, then represented by the reigning Haraldr Óláfsson. It is conceivable that Eóghan and Dubhghall sought kingship over the same jurisdiction that Hákon had awarded to Óspakr-Hákon about a decade before—a region which could have included some or all of the islands possessed by Clann Somhairle. In fact, it is possible that the events of 1247 and 1248 were related, and that Dubhghall and Eóghan sought to succeed Mac Somhairle's position in the Isles.

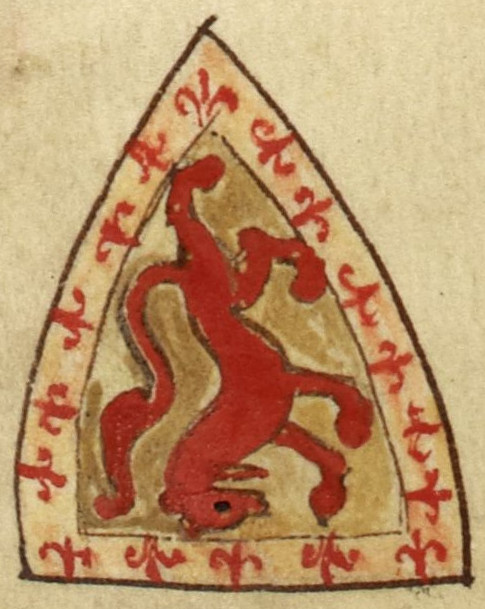
The arms of Alexander II depicted on folio 146v of British Library Royal 14 C VII (Historia Anglorum). The inverted shield represents the king's death in 1249.

It was only after the unexpected death of Haraldr Óláfsson in 1248 that Hákon sent Eóghan west-over-sea to temporarily take up the kingship of the Isles on his behalf. Eóghan, however, was not only a Norwegian dependant in the Isles, but an eminent Scottish magnate on the mainland. Although the Scottish Crown seems to have attempted to purchase the Isles earlier that decade, Eóghan's acceptance of Hákon's commission partly led Alexander II to unleash an invasion of Argyll in the summer of 1249, directed at the very heart of the Clann Dubhghaill lordship. The unfolding crisis only ended with the Scottish king's sudden death in July 1249. The first certain attestation of Aonghus Mór dates to the year after Eóghan finally himself with the Scottish Crown.

=== Scottish aggression and Norwegian subjection ===
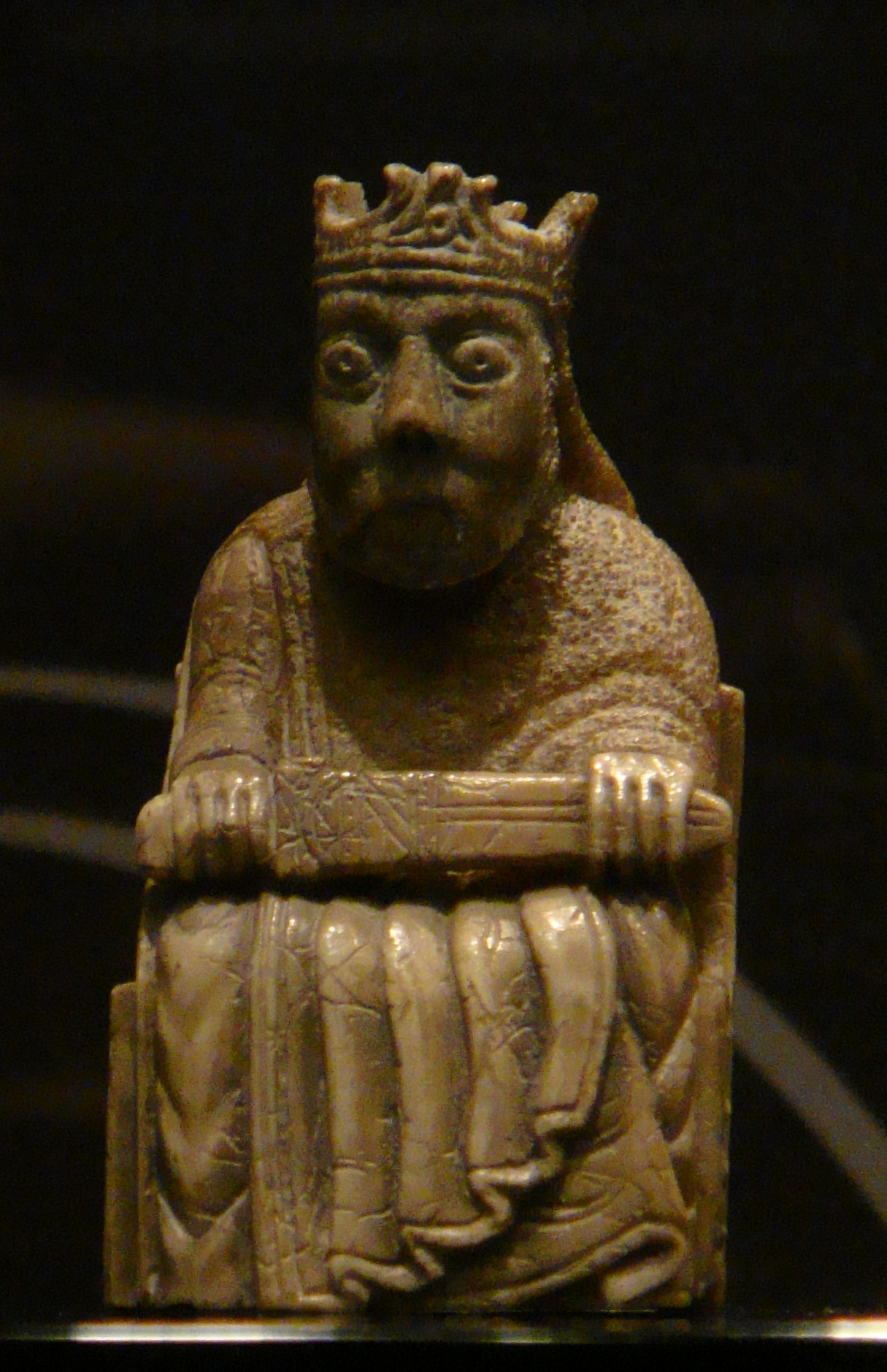
A king gaming piece of the Lewis chessmen. Comprising some four sets, the pieces are thought to have been crafted in Norway in the twelfth- and thirteenth centuries. They were uncovered in Lewis in the early nineteenth century. (Note: A contemporary piece of praise-poetry composed in honour of Aonghus Mór makes note of "brown ivory chessmen" as heirlooms inherited from his father.)

About a decade after Alexander II's death, his son and royal successor, Alexander III, came of age and took steps to continue his father's westward expansion. In 1261, the Scottish Crown sent envoys to Norway offering to purchase the Isles from Hákon. Once the Norwegians rejected the offer, the Scots are recorded to have lashed out against the Islesmen in a particularly savage attack upon the inhabitants of Skye. In 1262, the year after yet another failed attempt by the Scottish Crown to purchase the Hebrides, the thirteenth-century Hákonar saga Hákonarsonar reports that the Scots lashed out against the Islesmen in a particularly savage assault upon the inhabitants of Skye. Thus provoked, Hákon assembled an enormous fleet—described by the Icelandic annals as the largest force to have ever set sail from Norway—to reassert Norwegian sovereignty along the north and western coast of Scotland. (Note: Specifically, the words of the compiler of Hákonar saga Hákonarsonar, Hákon intended to "avenge the warfare that the Scots had made in his dominions".) In July 1263, this armada disembarked from Norway, and by mid August, Hákon reaffirmed his overlordship in Shetland and Orkney, forced the submission of Caithness, and arrived in the Hebrides.

According to Hákonar saga Hákonarsonar, Hákon was met in the region by Magnús Óláfsson, King of Mann and the Isles and Dubhghall himself. As the fleet made its way southwards, Hákon sent a detachment of vessels under the command of Dubhghall and Magnús Óláfsson to harry Kintyre whilst Hákon himself made landfall on Gigha. It is evident that Magnús Óláfsson and Dubhghall were tasked with bringing Aonghus Mór and Murchadh Mac Suibhne onto the king's side. The saga, and pieces of poetry embedded within it, glorifies the subsequent ravaging of Kintyre, suggesting that it was this rapaciousness that finally compelled Aonghus Mór and Murchadh to come into the king's peace. Certainly the saga reveals that these west-coast magnates duly submitted to Hákon, swearing oaths of allegiance, surrendering hostages into his keeping, and delivering the island of Islay into his control. The king is further said to have levied a tax of one thousand head of cattle upon the Kintyre headland, and a particular fortress—most likely Dunaverty Castle—is stated to have been surrendered to Hákon by an unidentified knight.

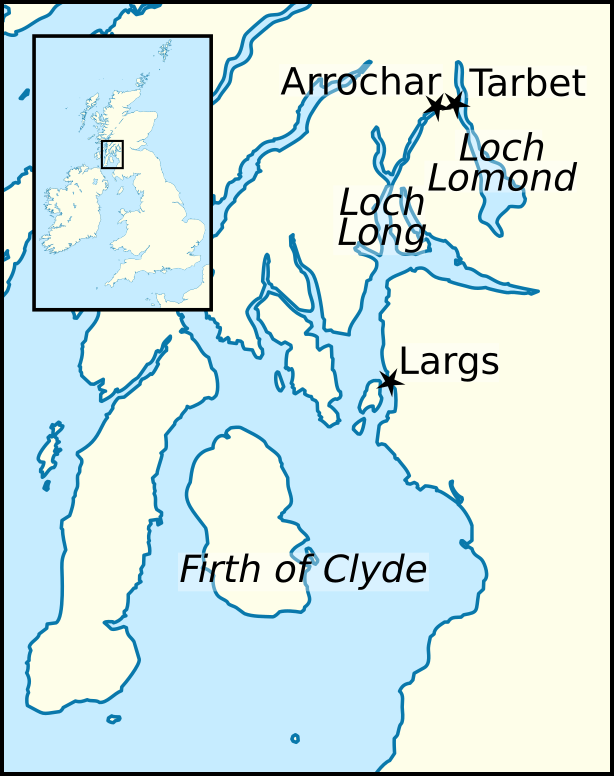
Locations relating to the expedition into the Lennox.

In early September, Hákon's fleet of Norwegians and Islesmen entered the Firth of Clyde. After negotiations between the Scottish and Norwegian administrations broke down, the saga identifies Magnús Óláfsson, Dubhghall, (the latter's brother) Ailéan, Aonghus Mór, and Murchadh, as the commanders of a detachment of Islesmen and Norwegians who entered Loch Long, portaged across land into Loch Lomond, and ravaged the surrounding region of the Lennox. (Note: The saga reveals that the fleet portaged the approximately a 2.5 kilometres (1.6 mi) distance between Arrochar to Tarbet. Although the placename Tarbet is variously stated to mean as "place of portage", this claim may be influenced by the saga's account of the expedition, and the place name actually means "isthmus".) According various versions of the saga, this contingent consisted of either forty or sixty ships—a considerable portion of Hákon's fleet. There is reason to suspect that this strike is evidence that the Norwegians and Islesmen were directing their fury at the territories of the powerful Stewart kindred. Furthermore, by penetrating into the Earldom of Lennox, and possibly striking further east inland, Hákon's adherents would have been encroaching into the Earldom of Menteith. (Note: The Stewarts and the comital family of Lennox were allied in marriage, as Maol Domhnaich, Earl of Lennox was married to Elizabeth Stewart, sister of Walter Stewart, Earl of Menteith.)

Meanwhile, at the beginning of October, Hákon's main force clashed with the Scots at Largs, and withdrew into the Hebrides. Once regrouped with the detachment of Islesmen, the saga records that Hákon rewarded his overseas supporters. Since Eóghan had refused to aid the Norwegians cause, Dubhghall and Ailéan were awarded his forfeited island territories. A certain Ruðri is stated to have received Bute, whilst Murchadh got Arran. Aonghus Mór—who is not identified as one of the beneficiaries—already enjoyed possession of Islay. (Note: Ruðri may have been a descendant of Óspakr suðreyski, or Aonghus Mór's uncle, Ruaidhrí.)

The quick-spoken assembly-convener of swords brought the sea-skis on the paths of the ocean to the Hebrides. Angus surrendered Islay, captured in battle, on account of the very vigorous spoiler of the splendid lair of the valley-char.

— excerpt from Hrafnsmál, by Sturla Þórðarson, observing Aonghus Mór's submission to Hákon.

Although the saga declares that the Norwegian campaign was an overwhelming triumph, it seems to have been an utter failure instead. Not only did Hákon fail to break Scottish power, but Alexander III seized the initiative the following year, and oversaw a series of invasions into the Isles and northern Scotland. Recognising this dramatic shift in royal authority, Magnús Óláfsson submitted to Alexander III within the year, and in so doing, symbolised the complete collapse of Norwegian sovereignty in the Isles.

The Scots' retaliatory campaign against the Islesmen was evidently commanded by Alexander Comyn, Earl of Buchan, Uilleam, Earl of Mar, and Alan Hostarius. According to the fourteenth-century Gesta Annalia II, and the fifteenth-century Scotichronicon, it was these magnates who oversaw the Scots' ravaging of the islands. This source is corroborated by the thirteenth-century Magnúss saga lagabœtis, which states that Scottish forces invaded the Isles in the summer after Hákon's campaign, and forced the submission of Aonghus Mór and other adherents to the Norwegian cause. Evidence from the Scottish exchequer, concerning Uilleam's reception of monetary aid for commanding two hundred serjeants on behalf of the king in the Hebrides, also validates these accounts. Further evidence of a concerted campaign against Hákon's supporters is the record of Walter Stewart, Earl of Menteith assembling a royal fleet at Ayr, and of Uilleam taking twenty cattle from Kintyre.

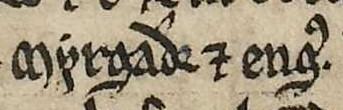
The names of Murchadh Mac Suibhne and Aonghus Mór as they appear on folio 122r of AM 45 fol (Codex Frisianus): "Myrgaðr ok Engus".

Despite these retributory actions, the Scottish Crown was only partially successful in turning Clann Somhairle onside as Dubhghall stubbornly refused the recognise Scottish overlordship. Nevertheless, in 1266, almost three years after Hákon's abortive campaign, terms of peace were finally agreed upon between the Scottish and Norwegian administrations. Specifically, with the conclusion of the Treaty of Perth in July, Hákon's son and successor, Magnús Hákonarson, King of Norway, formally resigned all rights to Mann and the islands on the western coast of Scotland. In so doing, the territorial dispute over Scotland's western maritime region was finally settled.

== A Scottish subject ==
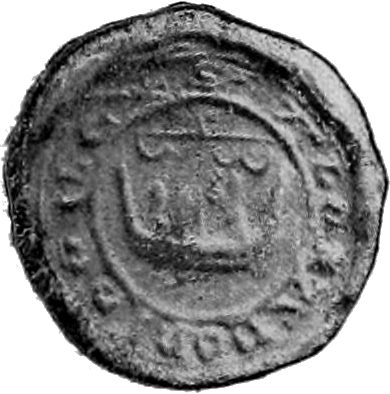
The seal of Aonghus Mór's eldest son and successor, Alasdair Óg.

=== Incorporation within Alexander III's realm ===
In the wake of the Norwegian withdrawal, and the violent extension of Scottish royal authority into the Isles, Aonghus Mór had no choice but to submit to the Scots. He was forced to hand over his son—seemingly Alasdair Óg, his eldest son and heir—who was consequently held at Ayr as a hostage of the Scottish Crown for Aonghus Mór's good behaviour. The fact that his son was accompanied by a nurse suggests that he was merely a young child at the time. In his submission, Aonghus Mór formally acknowledged that he would suffer disinheritance if his loyalty to the Scottish Crown was called into question again, whilst the other barons of Argyll swore to rise against him in the name of the king if such an eventuality came to pass.

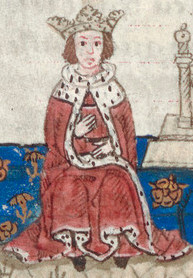
An imaginative sixteenth-century illustration of Alexander III, King of Scotland, attending the parliament of his English counterpart, as depicted by the Wriothesley Garter Book.

Western magnates such as those of Clann Somhairle were rarely present at the Scottish royal court, although on certain occasions they participated in important affairs of state. For instance, in 1284, Aonghus Mór attended a government council at Scone which acknowledged Alexander III's granddaughter, Margaret, as the king's rightful heir. The inclusion of Aonghus Mór and three of his Clann Somhairle kinsmen—Alasdair Mac Dubhghaill and Ailéan—further illustrates the kindred's incorporation within the Scottish realm. (Note: The three are the last magnates to be listed in the order documenting their attendance.)

=== Factionalism after Alexander III's death ===
Other evidence of the Clann Somhairle's incorporation within Scotland concerns the formation of alliances with various factions within the realm. Whilst Clann Dubhghall forged ties with the dominant Comyn kindred, Clann Domhnaill evidently aligned itself to the Bruce kindred. This latter partnership appears to owe itself to the unsettled period immediately after Alexander III's unexpected demise in March 1286. Although the leading magnates of the realm had previously recognised Margaret as his legitimate heir, there were two major factions that possessed competing claims to the kingship. At the beginning of April, Robert Bruce V, Lord of Annandale announced his claim to the throne, whilst John Balliol—a magnate backed by the Comyns—seems to have declared a claim of his own before the end of the month.

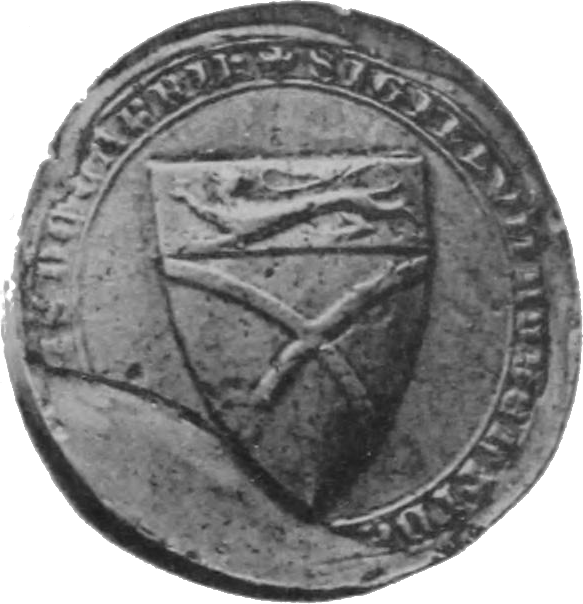
The seal of Robert Bruce VI. The Turnberry Band was concluded at this man's principal residence, Turnberry Castle.

It is possible that the Bruce faction regarded its claim to be weaker to that of Comyn-Balliol faction. In September, members of the faction concluded a pact, known as the Turnberry Band, in which certain Scottish and Anglo-Irish magnates—including Aonghus Mór and his son Alasdair Óg—pledged to support one another. Although the precise purpose of the pact is uncertain, it is possible that it was somehow connected to the Bruce faction's claim to the throne. In accordance to the pact, the participating Scottish magnates swore to support two prominent Anglo-Irish magnates: Richard de Burgh, Earl of Ulster and Thomas de Clare, Lord of Thomond. Thomas' father-in-law died the same year leaving him with claims in Connacht and Ulster. This could indicate that one of the purposes of the bond was to further the ambitions of Richard and Thomas in north-west Ireland, and enable the latter to secure possession of his northern inheritance from the clutches of his chief competitor, John fitz Thomas, and the numerous native kindreds of the region. One aspect of the pact, therefore, could have concerned the curtailment of overseas connections between Clann Domhnaill and Irish kindreds opposed to the earl, families such as the Uí Domhnaill and the Uí Néill. In fact, the bond coincided with an immense show of force by Richard in Connacht and Ulster. This campaign saw the earl's exaction of hostages from Cineál Chonaill and Cineál Eoghain, the deposition of (Brian's son) Domhnall Ó Néill from the kingship of Tír Chonaill, and the subsequent replacement of the latter with a more palatable candidate. The bond's Anglo-Irish cosignatories may have sought maritime support from Clann Domhnaill, and it is possible that Aonghus Mór contributed to the earl's operation.

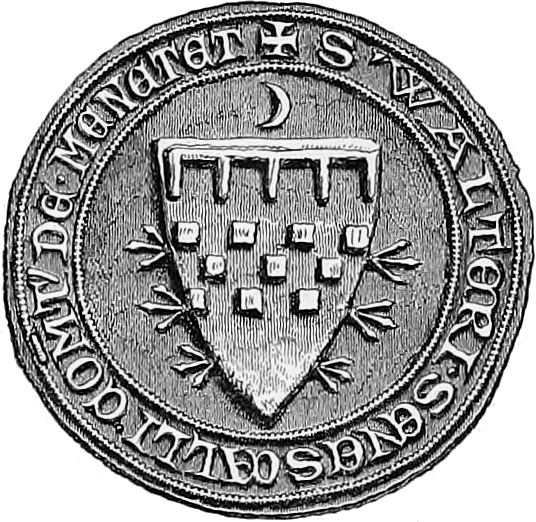
The seal of Walter Stewart, one of the signatories of the band.

The Bruces and Stewarts also had a stake in north-west Ireland, with the latter kindred eventually possessing claims to territories that had formerly been held by predecessors of John Balliol. (Note: In time, both the Bruces and Stewarts would possess personal connections with the earl. By 1296, Richard was certainly a brother-in-law of James Stewart, Steward of Scotland—himself a party to the bond—whilst Richard became a father-in-law of Robert Bruce V's like-named grandson in 1304.) The participation of the Stewart/Menteith kindred in the band could have also concerned its part in the hostile annexation of the Clann Suibhne lordship in Argyll. Forced from its Scottish homeland, Clann Suibhne evidently found a safe haven in Tír Chonaill on account of an alliance forged with Domhnall Óg. Not only was the latter's son and successor, Aodh, the product of a union with a member of Clann Suibhne, but Domhnall Óg himself had been fostered by this family. The fact that Murchadh is known to have died imprisoned by Richard's father could in turn indicate that the earls of Ulster were opposed to Clann Suibhne's resettlement in the region. (Note: Murchadh is the first member of Clann Suibhne recorded in Ireland, and by the Irish annals.) Clann Domhnaill's part in Toirdhealbhach's defeat of Aodh in 1290 meant that the forces of Clann Domhnaill were engaged supporting the cause of Aonghus Mór's maternal grandson against a maternal descendant of Clann Suibhne. Whether this clash was a direct result of the bond is uncertain, although it seems likely that Aonghus Mór's part in the pact concerned the value of his family's military might. (Note: The notice of Clann Domhnaill's part in Aodh's defeat to Toirdhealbhach is the first specific record of the term "gallowglass" (gallóglach). Although this is certainly not the first time such overseas warriors were utilised in Ireland, it is the first time they are recorded to have been used to topple an Irish king.)

=== Kin-strife under the regime of John Balliol ===
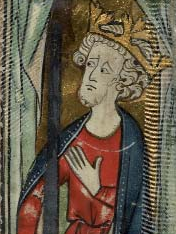
A thirteenth-century illumination of Edward I, King of England on folio 6v of British Library Cotton Vitellius A XIII.

By the death of Alexander III, the Clann Domhnaill holdings seem to have included Kintyre, Islay, southern Jura, and seemingly Colonsay and Oronsay. Whilst Aonghus Mór is regularly described with a patronymic referring to his father, Aonghus Mór's sons tend to be accorded the territorial designation "of Islay". In 1292, the English Crown granted Aonghus Mór and Alasdair Óg safe conduct to travel and trade between Scotland and Ireland. 1292 is also the year in which a violent feud between Clann Domhnaill and Clann Dubhghaill is first attested. The infighting appears to have stemmed from Alasdair Óg's marriage to an apparent member of Clann Dubhghaill, and seems to have concerned this woman's territorial claims. Although Aonghus Mór, Alasdair Óg, and Alasdair Mac Dubhghaill, swore to Edward I, King of England that they would postpone the feud, and pledged to uphold the peace in the "isles and outlying territories", the bitter internecine struggle continued throughout the 1290s.

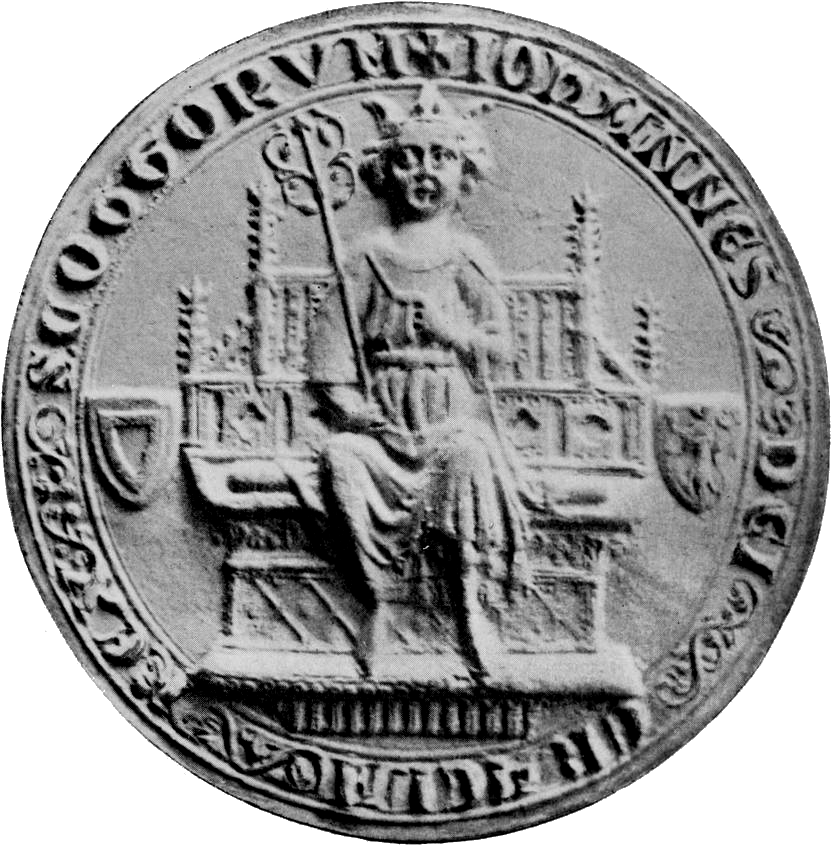
The seal of John, King of Scotland, a monarch closely connected with Aonghus Mór's neighbouring rival, Alasdair Mac Dubhghaill.

In February 1293, at the first parliament of John, King of Scotland, three new sheriffdoms were erected in the western reaches of the realm. In the north-west, William II, Earl of Ross was made Sheriff of Skye, with a jurisdiction that appears to correspond to the territories formerly held by the Crovan dynasty before 1266. In the central-west, Alasdair Mac Dubhghaill was made Sheriff of Lorn, with a jurisdiction over much of Argyll. In the south-west, James Stewart, Steward of Scotland was made Sheriff of Kintyre. The creation of these divisions dramatically evidences the steady consolidation of royal authority in the west in since 1266. Remarkably, representatives of Clann Domhnaill failed to attend the king's inaugural parliament. (Note: At one point, an apparent Clann Domhnaill dynast named "Douenald filius Aneg'" is listed as absent. Although it is conceivable that this name refers to an otherwise attested Domhnall of Islay, it is more likely a scribal error in reference to Aonghus Mór ('Aonghus mac Domhnaill'), who is ordered to render his homage by Easter, 1293. Another noted absentee was evidently Robert Bruce V's son, Robert Bruce VI, Earl of Carrick. The record of parliamentary nonattendance may reveal Clann Domhnaill's continued support of the Bruces after the Turnberry accord. The earlier pledges of peace made by Clann Domhnaill and Clann Dubhghaill to the English Crown reveal that Edward made two particular Guardians of Scotland guarantors for the concord. One was the steward, James, whilst the other was John Comyn II, Lord of Badenoch. The fact that the former guardian seems to have been a brother-in-law of Alasdair Mac Dubhghaill suggests that the steward and Clann Domhnaill may have been politically aligned. The steward was certainly another signatory at Turnberry.) Days later, Alasdair Mac Dubhghaill—the Scottish Crown's leading representative in the west—was commanded to bring Aonghus Mór and two other regional landholders to do homage before the king by Easter. (Note: The two other handholders are Laghmann Mac Fearchair, and Aonghus, son of Donnchadh mac Fearchair. The former is the eponymous ancestor of Clann Laghmainn, whilst the latter is a kinsman of his. The document preserving the summons describes Aonghus Mór as "miles" ("knight"), which could be evidence that he had been knighted.) Although it is unknown if Aonghus Mór obeyed the summons, the pledge by the barons of Argyll—to rise up against him in the event of his infidelity—may date to about this time. Whatever the case, it is apparent that by the 1290s the Scottish Crown demanded and expected unquestioned loyalty from Clann Somhairle.

Aonghus Mór seems to have died in about 1293. According to Hebridean tradition preserved by the eighteenth-century Book of Clanranald and the Sleat History, he died on Islay, with the latter source locating his burial on Iona. Alasdair Óg's undated renewal of Aonghus Mór's charter concerning the church of St Ciarán seems to be evidence that the later had been succeeded by the date of its issue. Certainly, Alasdair Óg appears to have succeeded Aonghus Mór by the mid 1290s.
