= Turnberry Band =

The Turnberry Band, also known as the Turnberry Bond, was a pact between Scottish and Anglo-Irish nobles signed on 20 September 1286 at Turnberry Castle, Ayrshire, Scotland. The agreement may have concerned a campaign in Ireland, and may have later formed the basis that bound the group around the claim of the Bruce family to the Scottish throne.

== The Turnberry Alliance ==
=== English Translation ===
Bond by Patrick Earl of Dunbar, Patrick, John, and Alexander his sons, Walter Stewart, Earl of Menteith, Alexander and John his sons, Robert of Bruce, Lord of Annandale, and Robert of Bruce, Earl of Carrick, and Richard of Bruce his sons, James, Steward of Scotland, and John his brother, Enegus, son of Dovenald, and Alexander his lawful son, whereby they engage to adhere to Sir Richard de Burgh, Earl of Ulster, and Sir Thomas of Clare in all their affairs, and to stand faithfully by them and their accomplices against all their adversaries, saving their fidelity to the King of England, and also to him who should obtain the kingdom of Scotland by reason of relationship to Alexander King of Scotland last deceased. At Turnebyry in Carrick, on the eve of St. Matthew, 20th September 1286,....

=== Signatories ===
- Patrick de Dunbar, Earl of Dunbar
- Patrick de Dunbar, son of Patrick de Dunbar, Earl of Dunbar
- John, son of Patrick de Dunbar, Earl of Dunbar
- Alexander, son of Patrick de Dunbar, Earl of Dunbar
- Walter Stewart, Earl of Menteith
- Alexander Stewart, son of Walter Stewart, Earl of Menteith
- John Stewart, son of Walter Stewart, Earl of Menteith
- Robert de Brus, Lord of Annandale
- Robert de Brus, Earl of Carrick, son of Robert de Brus, Lord of Annandale
- Richard de Brus, son of Robert de Brus, Lord of Annandale
- James Steward, High Steward of Scotland
- John Stewart, son of James Stewart, High Steward of Scotland
- Richard de Burgh, Earl of Ulster
- Thomas de Clare, Lord of Thomond
- Aonghas mac Domhnaill, Lord of Islay
- Alexander, son of Aonghas mac Domhnaill, Lord of Islay
