= Sheriff of Lorn =

Historic official

The Sheriff of Lorn/Lorne was historically the royal official responsible for enforcing law and order in Lorne, Scotland and bringing criminals to justice. The sheriffdom was created in 1293 by King John of Scotland in an effort to maintain peace in the western reaches of his realm. Dunollie Castle was the seat of the sheriff.

== Sheriffs of Lorn ==
- Alasdair Mac Dubhghaill 1293-1306
- Archibald Campbell, 7th Earl of Argyll c.1610
- Archibald Campbell, 1st Marquess of Argyll

== Citations and References ==
Citations

- Brown, M (2004). The Wars of Scotland, 1214–1371. The New Edinburgh History of Scotland (series vol. 4). Edinburgh: Edinburgh University Press. ISBN 978-0748612383.
- Brown, M (2011). "Aristocratic Politics and the Crisis of Scottish Kingship, 1286–96". Scottish Historical Review. 90 (1): 1–26. doi:10.3366/shr.2011.0002. eISSN 1750-0222. ISSN 0036-9241.
- Cochran-Yu, DK (2015). A Keystone of Contention: The Earldom of Ross, 1215–1517 (PhD thesis). University of Glasgow – via Glasgow Theses Service.
- Stell, GP (October 2005). "John [John de Balliol] (c. 1248x50–1314)". Oxford Dictionary of National Biography. Vol. 1 (online ed.). Oxford University Press. doi:10.1093/ref:odnb/1209. (Subscription or UK public library membership required.)
- Young, A; Stead, MJ (2010) [1999]. In the Footsteps of Robert Bruce in Scotland, Northern England and Ireland. Brimscombe Port: The History Press. ISBN 978-0-7524-5642-3.
