= Lord of Islay =

Lord of Islay was a thirteenth- and fourteenth-century title borne by the chiefs of Clann Domhnaill before they assumed the title "Lord of the Isles" in the late fourteenth century. The first person regarded to have styled themself "Lord of Islay" is Aonghus Mór, son of the eponymous ancestor of the clan, Domhnall mac Raghnaill. The designation "of Islay" was frequently used by these lords and later members of the clan.

== Lords of Islay ==
- Aonghus Mór mac Domhnaill (d. c. 1293), "dominus de Hyle".
- Alasdair Óg Mac Domhnaill (died 1299?)
- Aonghus Óg Mac Domhnaill (died 1314×1318/c.1330)
- Eóin Mac Domhnaill (died c. 1387)
