= Hugh Bisset =

Sir Hugh Bisset was an Anglo-Norman nobleman who was Lord of the Glens of Antrim and Rathlin in Ireland.

In 1298, during the early years of the Wars of Scottish Independence, Bisset landed on Arran with a large force, intending to support the Scottish resistance to English occupation. On learning of the defeat of the Scottish army at the battle of Falkirk, he entered into the service of King Edward I of England and was rewarded with the Isle of Arran. After the defeat and slaying of Alexander Og MacDonald, Lord of Islay in 1299 by the forces of Alexander MacDougall, Lord of Argyll, an expedition led by Angus Og MacDonald, John MacSween and Sir Hugh Bisset, was undertaken against the Lord of Argyll.

During the winter of 1306, Bisset led a fleet of ships in the North Channel with John of Argyll. In January 1307 he was ordered to join the Admirals of the Fleet, John de Botetourt and Simon Montagu to search for the fugitive Robert I, King of Scots, but he did not put to sea until 2 May. His force of 500 men patrolled the southern Hebrides for 40 days. His son, John Bisset, was paid 100 marks to guard the islands and Kintyre coast with four barges manned by 100 men. In the summer of 1310, Hugh Bisset's fleet was positioned off the Isle of Bute in preparation for Edward II of England's planned invasion of Scotland.

Bisset opposed Edward Bruce's invasion of Ireland in 1315 and on 1 November 1316, he and John Logan led a force in a battle in which 300 Scots were killed. However, he appears to have changed sides between England and Scotland when it suited. He forfeited lands in Ireland for his betrayal of Edward II of England. In 1319, the Glens of Antrim and Rathlin Island were granted to John de Athy, Warden of Carrickfergus Castle.

Bisset was granted the barony of Glenarm in 1338.
