= Sleat History =

The Sleat History, also known as the History of the MacDonalds, is a seventeenth-century historical source documenting the history of Clan Donald.

The history is preserved in one manuscript, NLS Advocates' MS 73.1.12. The work appears to date to c. 1660/1678×85. A transcription of the text was published in 1914.

The authorship of the history is uncertain. On one hand, it could have been the work of a certain Hugh MacDonald, a man who may be identical to a certain Aodh Beaton, a member of the North Uist branch of the Beaton medical kindred. On the other hand, the history could have been the work of Uisdean MacDonald of Paiblesgarry, a member of the MacDonalds of Sleat.

Whereas the Red Book of Clanranald focuses upon the history of the MacDonalds of Clanranald, the Sleat History focuses upon the history of the MacDonalds of Sleat. The work is disparaging in its treatment of the MacDougalls, MacRuairies (who are ignored), the MacLeans, and various Clan Donald branches like those of MacDonalds of Ardnamurchan and the MacDonalds of Glengarry.
