= Sheriff of Kintyre =

Scottish royal official, 1293 to 1481

The Sheriff of Kintyre was historically the royal official responsible for enforcing law and order in Kintyre, Scotland and bringing criminals to justice. The sheriffdom was created in 1293 by King John of Scotland in an effort to maintain peace in the western reaches of his realm. At some point before 1481, it was superseded by, or became, Tarbertshire.

== Sheriffs of Kintyre ==
- James Stewart, High Steward of Scotland 1293-??

== Citations and references ==
Citations

References

- Brown, M (2004). The Wars of Scotland, 1214–1371. The New Edinburgh History of Scotland (series vol. 4). Edinburgh: Edinburgh University Press. ISBN 978-0748612383 – via Google Books.
- Brown, M (2011). "Aristocratic Politics and the Crisis of Scottish Kingship, 1286–96". Scottish Historical Review. 90 (1): 1–26. doi:10.3366/shr.2011.0002. eISSN 1750-0222. ISSN 0036-9241.
- Cochran-Yu, DK (2015). A Keystone of Contention: The Earldom of Ross, 1215–1517 (PhD thesis). University of Glasgow – via Glasgow Theses Service.
- Stell, GP (October 2005). "John [John de Balliol] (c.1248x50–1314)". Oxford Dictionary of National Biography. Vol. 1 (online ed.). Oxford University Press. doi:10.1093/ref:odnb/1209. (Subscription, Wikipedia Library access or UK public library membership required.)
