= Michael Brown (historian) =

Scottish medievalist

Michael Hunter Brown (born 1965) is a Scottish medievalist lecturing at the University of St Andrews. In 1991 he was the recipient of the Royal Historical Society's David Berry Prize. His volume on the reign of King James I of Scotland led to the award of the Agnes Mure prize for Scottish history. Brown's work is concentrated on late Medieval Scotland and its nobility. He is married to Margaret Connolly who also works at the University of St Andrews as a medievalist.

== Select bibliography ==
- James I. Tuckwell Press. 1994
- Black Douglases: War and Lordship in Late Medieval Scotland, 1300-1455. Tuckwell Press. 1998
- Earldom and kindred: the Lennox and its earls, 1200-1458 - Steve Boardman & Alasdair Ross (editors)
- The exercise of power in medieval Scotland, c. 1200-1500. Four Courts Press. 2003
- The Wars of Scotland, 1214–1371. Edinburgh University Press. 2004. ISBN 978-0-7486-3333-3. OL 7963997M.
- Bannockburn: the Scottish War and the British Isles, 1307–1323. Edinburgh University Press. 2008. ISBN 978-0-7486-3333-3. OL 26862954M.
- Disunited Kingdoms: Peoples and Politics in the British Isles 1280-1460, Pearson. 2013
