= Iain Sprangach MacDonald =

Scottish clan founder

Iain Sprangach MacDonald (died 1340) was a younger son of Angus Mor of Islay, and founder of Clan MacDonald of Ardnamurchan.
