= MacDonald of Ardnamurchan =

Scottish clan

The MacDonalds of Ardnamurchan, also known as MacIain of Ardnamurchan, or Clan MacIan, were a Scottish family and a branch of the larger Clan Donald. They ruled the area of Ardnamurchan from the 1300s until the 1600s.

== History ==
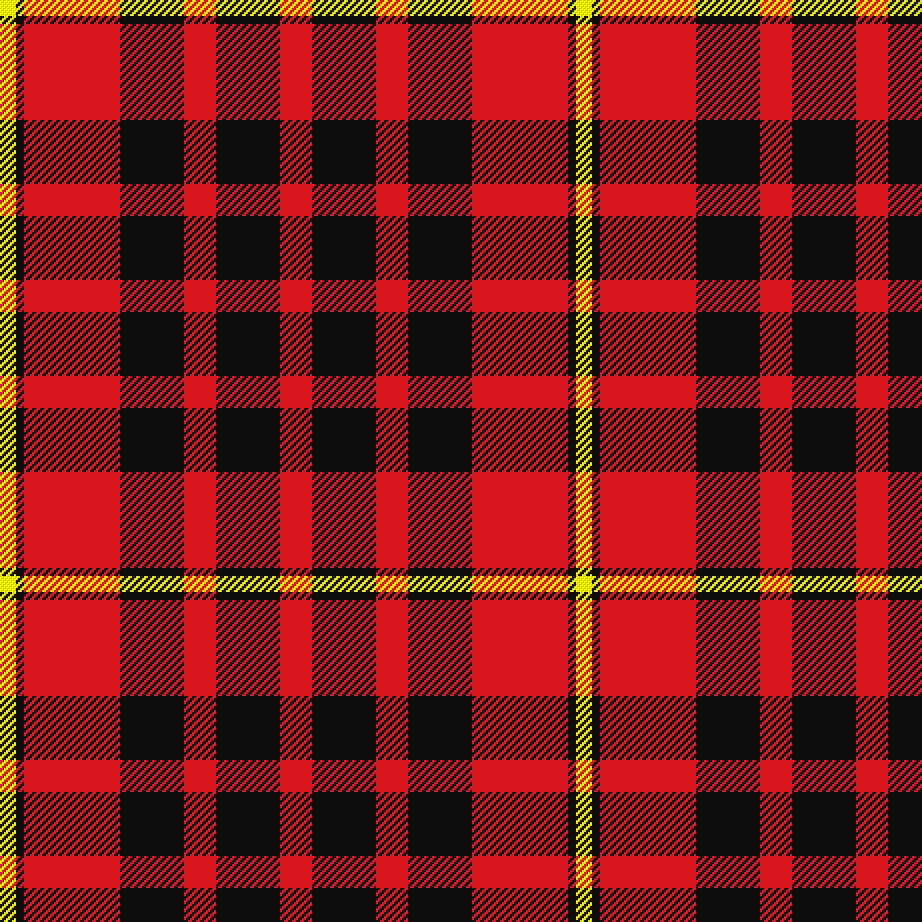
Tartan for the MacDonalds of Ardnamurchan.

=== Origins of the Clan ===
The founder of the MacDonalds of Ardnamurchan was Iain Sprangach MacDonald (d.1340), the third son of Angus Mor MacDonald (d.1292), 4th chief of Clan Donald. Iain is the Scottish Gaelic for the Christian name John. The surname MacIain therefore means son of John.

Iain Sprangach MacDonald was also known as John the Bold. His brother, Angus Og MacDonald, Lord of the Isles, was a great ally of King Robert the Bruce. Ian's early affiliations, like those of his family, were serving Edward I (until Robert Bruce became King of Scots). His grant of Ardnamurchan likely came from his brother, Angus Og, as it was one of the lands granted to Angus Og by Robert I. The MacDonalds of Ardnamurchan became known as the MacIains. The history of the Clan is for the most part merged with the Clan Donald in general until the fall of the Lordship of the Isles in 1493.

=== 15th century ===
Alexander MacDonald, the third chief of the MacIains, is believed to have fought and been killed during the Battle of Harlaw in 1411. Alexander's son John led the clan at the Battle of Inverlochy (1431). After this he was awarded lands on the isles of Islay and Jura by Alexander MacDonald, Lord of the Isles.

The MacIains supported the MacDonald Lordship of the Isles until, in 1493, the fourth and last Lord of the Isles forfeited his title to King James IV. By 1494 the king had garrisoned and provisioned Dunaverty Castle. It is said that the MacDonalds led by Sir John MacDonald, whom the king had recently knighted, retook the castle before the king had even departed to Stirling, and that the dead body of the king's castle governor was hung over the castle walls in sight of the king and his departing entourage. Sir John Macdonald however was later captured by the infamous John MacDonald (or MacIain) of Ardnamurchan. He was tried and hung on the Burgh Muir.

In 1497 Sir Alexander MacDonald of Lochalsh rebelled against the king and invaded the lands of Ross-shire, where he was defeated at the Battle of Drumchatt by the Clan Mackenzie. Alexander MacDonald of Lochalsh escaped southwards amongst the Isles until he was caught on the Isle of Oronsay and put to death by John MacIain of Ardnamurchan.

=== 16th century ===
In 1515 MacIain of Ardnamurchan's Mingarry Castle was besieged by the Clan MacDonald of Lochalsh and again two years later when they finally took the castle.

Other treacherous deeds against MacDonald of Lochalsh and treachery which led to the execution of the chief of the Clan MacDonald of Dunnyveg and his son eventually led to the death of John MacIain at the hands of his avenging kinsmen. John MacIain, apparently deserted by a great deal of his followers, had little chance of resisting, and was killed along with two of his sons at the battle of Creag an Airgid in 1518.

After his death, John MacIain was succeeded by his cousin Alexander MacIain, who unlike his predecessor, vigorously supported the actions of the rest of Clan Donald, especially their close allies, the Clan Ranald. Alexander was a staunch supporter of John of Moidart and joined the raids into Urquhart and Glenmorison that preceded the "Battle of the Shirts".

The 8th chief of the MacDonalds or MacIains of Ardnamurchan, Alexander MacIain, led his clan in support of the Clan Macdonald of Clanranald against the Clan Fraser of Lovat in the Battle of the Shirts (Blàr na Léine in Scottish Gaelic) in 1544. It is said that only eight MacDonalds and five Frasers survived. Although the casualty figure is likely exaggerated, it speaks to the fact that it was extremely bloody and certainly had lasting negative effects on both clans.

By 1618 the MacDonalds or MacIains of Ardnamurchan had lost their lands through duplicity of the Clan Campbell. The fortunes of the clan declined and the many tenants and followers were forced to go elsewhere. Many settled in Moidart under the Clan Macdonald of Clanranald whilst others migrated east to Badenoch, and others found new homes in the Scottish Lowlands. Many MacIains settled in Northern Ireland during the Ulster Plantations, with many of these travelling to the Americas. Later in the 1800s, MacIains commonly settled in Australia and New Zealand. Many MacIain derivatives like "McKain" and "McKean", can also be plentifully found all over Scotland in Birth and Marriage records from the 1600s to the present. In recent years, there has been renewed interest in clan MacIain identity, especially in the diaspora residing in the United States. Although scattered, clan MacIain still has many thousands of descendants worldwide.

A rather humorous folktale also exists regarding a member of the Clan MacIain in the book Superstitions of the Highlands and Islands of Scotland by John Gregorson Campbell. The story follows, "This man (Mac Iain Ghiarr), whose name is proverbial in the West Highlands for that of a master thief, was one of the Mac lans of Ardnamurchan, a persecuted race. He had a boat for going on his thieving expeditions painted black on one side and white on the other, so that those who saw it passing would not recognize it on its return. Hence the proverb: “One side black and one side grey, Like Mac Ian Year’s boat.” Many tales are told of his skill in thieving, and the accomplishment is said to have been bestowed upon him by a Glaistig. He and his brother Ronald (his own name was Archibald) were out hunting, and having killed a roe, took it to a bothy and prepared it for supper. He threw himself on a bed of heather, and Ronald sat by the fire, roasting pieces of the roe on his dirk. A woman entered the hut, and made an effort now and then to snatch from him some of the roasted flesh. Ronald threatened, unless she kept over her paw (sall) he would cut it off with his knife. She appealed to Archibald, “Ho, Archibald, will you not put a stop to Ronald?” “I will put a stop to him, poor creature,” he said. He told Ronald to allow the poor woman, that they had plenty, and perhaps she was hungry. When leaving, the Glaistig asked him to the door, and it is supposed then bestowed upon him his wonderful gift of theft. He built a large byre when he had not a single ‘hoof’ to put in it, and before long it was amply stocked. He hired the Glaistig to herd for him, and she was to be heard at night on the tops of the cliffs crying “Ho ho, ho ho,” to keep the cattle from wandering too near the verge. Her wages were to be a pair of brogues of untanned leather, and when she got these, like the rest of her kind, she disappeared. She seems, however, only to have returned to her former haunts, which extended all over Ardnamurchan, from the Point to Loch Sunart. When her former master died, she gave a shriek that roused the echoes of Ben Resipol (Réiscapol), The same night she was seen in the Coolin hills in Skye, and after that neither her shadow nor her colour (a du no dath) were anywhere seen. During her period of service with Mac Ian Year, she made her appearance whenever he raised his standard, however far away she might be. Ronald’s dog had a great aversion to her, and chased her whenever she came near. She was then to be heard calling out, “Ho, Archibald, will you not call off the dog?” (Ho, Laspuig, nach caisg thu ’n cù?), — a common phrase in Ardnamurchan and the small isles to this day. It is related of her, that to escape from her attentions, Mac Ian Year and his brother resolved to remove to the Outer Hebrides. They had barely kindled a fire in their new dwelling, when the Glaistig called down the chimney they had forgot the old harrow, but she had brought it, and that she was only on the top of the Coolin Hills when the first clink (snag) was given to the flint to kindle the fire. There was nothing for it but to return to Ardnamurchan." The folktale lends much evidence to the MacIains reputation as an outlawed clan, likely involved in such activity as cattle raiding and plundering by the 17th century.

== Castles ==
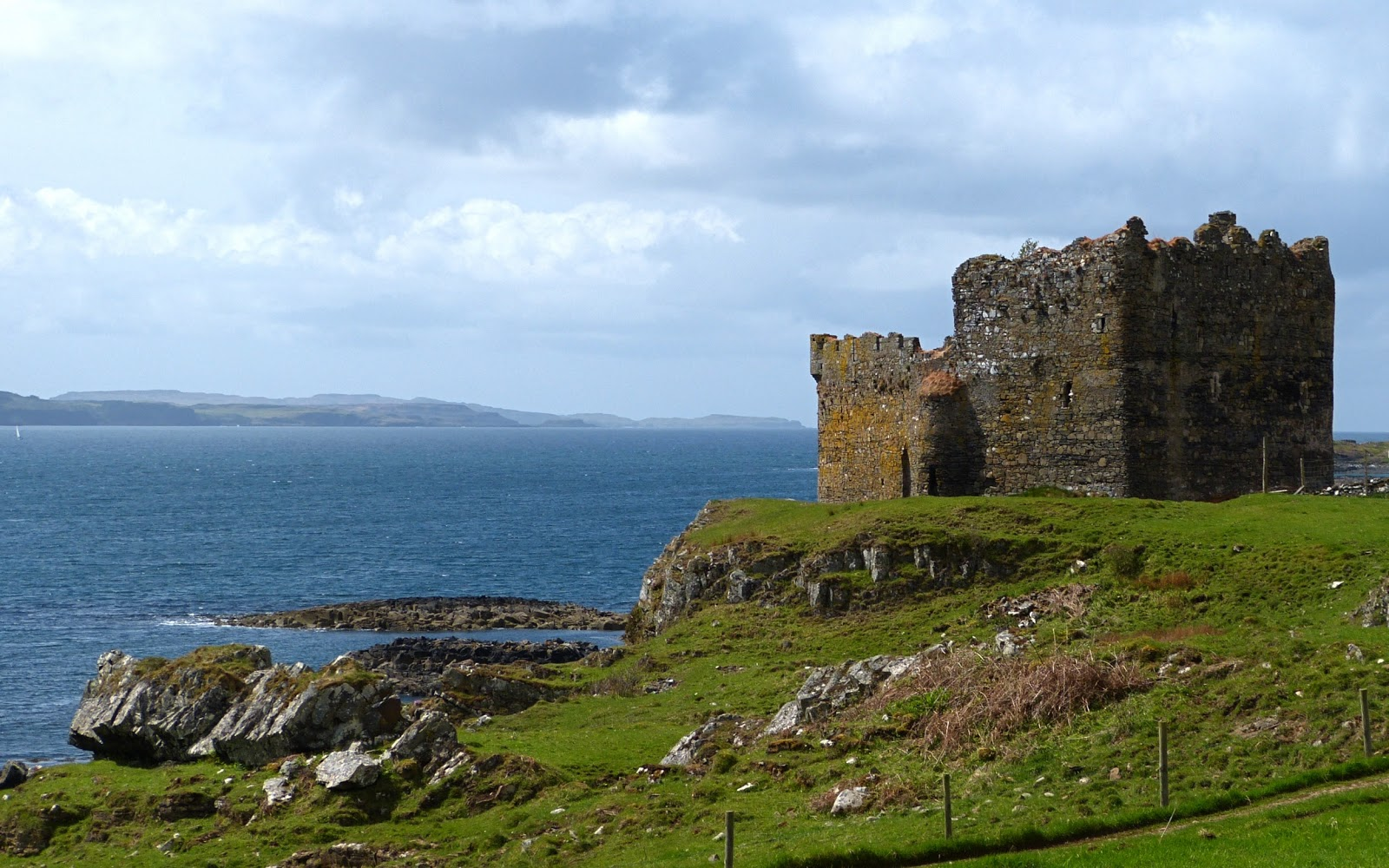
Mingary Castle, historic seat of the chiefs of Clan MacIain of Ardnamurchan

- Mingary Castle, located to the east of Kilchoan, on the Ardnamurchan peninsula, dates from the thirteenth century and was probably originally built by the clan MacDougall. The land of Ardnamurchan was given to the MacDonalds for their service in the armies of Robert the Bruce. Mingary was the residence of the MacIain chiefs and stronghold of the clan. Legend says that a remnant of the Spanish Armada helped the rival Clan MacLean to besiege the castle of their old enemies in 1588. The MacLeans saw an opportunity and agreed to help the Spanish captain if he would help them attack their old enemies, the MacIains of Mingary. The Spanish captain had little choice but to agree, and together the Spanish and the MacLeans sailed across the Sound of Mull and attacked Mingary. The attack failed, but even today the small inlet below the castle is known as Port nan Spainteach, or Port of the Spaniards.
- Dunyvaig Castle, on the Isle of Islay, Argyll was originally held by the MacDonalds but was given to the MacIains of Ardnamurchan at the end of the fifteenth century. The property was later leased back to the MacDonalds and then passed to the Campbells.

== Clan Septs ==
Septs of Clan MacDonald of Ardnamurchan include the following. Other branches of the Clan MacDonald have different septs. These surnames are all anglicized forms of the gaelic "MacIain", meaning "Son of John".

- Johnston (Isle of Coll)
- Johnson
- Kean
- Keene
- MacKean
- MacEan
- MacKain
- MacIan
- MacIain
- MacKane
- MacKeand
- MacCain

== See also ==
- Clan Donald
- Scottish clan

== Notes ==
8. MacDonald, D. J. (2008). Clan Donald. Pelican Publishing.
