= Turnberry Castle =

Castle ruin in Ayrshire, Scotland

Coordinates: 55.3261°N 4.8441°W

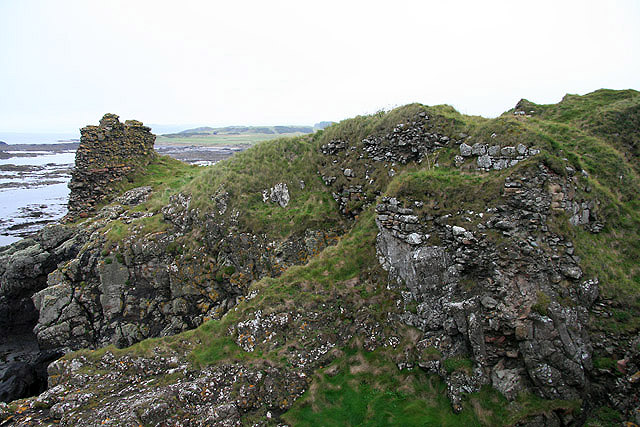
- The remains of the castle

General information
- Architectural style: Castle
- Location: A719 Maidens Rd, Turnberry, Scotland
- Completed: c. 1200
- Demolished: c. 1310

Turnberry Castle is a fragmentary ruin on the coast of Kirkoswald parish, near Maybole in Ayrshire, Scotland. Situated at the extremity of the lower peninsula within the parish, it was the seat of the Earls of Carrick. Turnberry Castle is adjacent to Turnberry Golf Course.

== History ==
As to when or by whom Turnberry was built there seems to be no authentic record; but it was originally a stronghold of the Lords of Galloway, and thence passed into the possession of the Earls of Carrick around the beginning of the 13th century. In the late 13th century the castle belonged to Marjorie, the widowed Countess of Carrick. According to medieval legend, Marjorie held the visiting knight Robert de Brus captive until he agreed to marry her. The marriage between Marjorie and Robert in 1271 conveyed to him both the castle and the earldom. Their first son, also named Robert, went on to become "Robert the Bruce", the King of Scots. Although it is unknown whether Turnberry was his actual birthplace, the fact that he spent his boyhood residing in the castle is not in doubt.

Turnberry Castle is associated with two significant historical events, both of which are directly connected to Robert the Bruce. On 20 September 1286, several Scottish barons who supported the title of the Bruce as successor of the crown met secretly at Turnberry Castle. Robert was only 12 years old at the time. The second event was the attempt made by Robert in the spring of 1307, to recover the castle from the English, who occupied it at the time. This attempt was only partially successful, although ultimately it led to the withdrawal of the English soldiers. His attempt to reclaim the castle marked the beginning of a long road, ending with Robert's eventual success at Bannockburn. It was Robert the Bruce who ordered the destruction (slighting) of the castle in 1310, to prevent it from falling once again into the hands of the English. The castle was nearly destroyed; the ruins that remain are part of the original castle as it does not appear to have been rebuilt.

== Description ==
There is little left of the old buildings today. Turnberry Castle is surrounded on three sides by the sea, and the landward side is occupied by a golf resort. The ruin has been affected by the actions of centuries of severe weather and erosion by the sea, leaving little more than its lower vaults and cellars intact. There are some vestiges of a drawbridge as well as an old portcullis which may have done duty as a gate. By the extent of the rock which seems to be included at the site, the castle appears to have been a fortress of great size and strength. There are also caves that lead out into the sea, that may have served the castle as a harbour. Turnberry lighthouse was built on part of the castle's site in 1873, and still stands today.

== See also ==
- Turnberry Band
- Message from Turnberry
