= Henderson =

Henderson may refer to:

== People ==
- Henderson (surname), description of the surname, and a list of people with the surname
- Clan Henderson, a Scottish clan

== Places ==
=== Argentina ===
- Henderson, Buenos Aires

=== Australia ===
- Henderson, Western Australia

=== Canada ===
- Henderson Settlement, New Brunswick

=== New Zealand ===
- Henderson, New Zealand
- Henderson (New Zealand electorate), former parliamentary electorate

=== United States ===
- Henderson, Colorado
- Henderson, Georgia
- Henderson, Houston County, Georgia
- Henderson, Illinois
- Henderson, Indiana
- Henderson, Iowa
- Henderson, Kentucky
- Henderson, Louisiana
- Henderson, Maryland
- Henderson, Michigan
- Henderson, Minnesota
- Henderson, Missouri
- Henderson, Nebraska
- Henderson, Nevada
- Henderson, New York, a town
  - Henderson (CDP), New York, a hamlet in the town
- Henderson, North Carolina
- Henderson, Tennessee
- Henderson, Texas
- Henderson, West Virginia
- Henderson County (disambiguation)
- Henderson Township (disambiguation)

== Geographic features ==
- Henderson (crater), on the far side of the Moon
- Henderson Inlet, a small estuary in Olympia, Washington, United States
- Henderson Island (Pitcairn Islands), South Pacific Ocean
- Henderson Island (Shackleton Ice Shelf), Antarctica
- Henderson Islets, Tasmania, south-eastern Australia
- Henderson Mountain, Montana, United States

== Companies ==
- Henderson Land Development, a Hong Kong real estate developer
  - Henderson China, a Chinese real estate developer
- D. and W. Henderson and Company, a former Scottish shipbuilding company
- Henderson's, a former UK bookstore
- Henderson's, manufacturers of Henderson's Relish
- Henderson Group, a UK financial services company
- Henderson Motorcycle, a historical US maker of motorcycles

== Constructs ==
=== Airports ===
- Henderson Executive Airport, Clark County, Nevada, United States
- Henderson Field (Guadalcanal), Solomon Islands
- Henderson Field (Midway Atoll), United States
- Henderson Field (North Carolina), Wallace, North Carolina, United States

=== Churches ===
- Henderson Church in Kilmarnock, Scotland

=== Schools ===
- Henderson Avenue Public School, Thornhill, Ontario, Canada, Canada
- Henderson Elementary School, Vancouver, British Columbia
- Henderson Secondary School, Singapore
- Henderson County High School, Henderson, Kentucky, United States
- Henderson High School (disambiguation)
- Henderson Middle School (disambiguation)

=== University ===
- Henderson State University, Arkadelphia, Arkansas, United States

== In popular culture ==
- Fictional town in which the soap opera Search for Tomorrow is set

== See also ==
- Hendersonville (disambiguation)
- Justice Henderson (disambiguation)
