= Clan Henderson =

Scottish clan

Clan Henderson/MacEanruig
- Mac Eanruig
- Motto: Sola virtus nobilitat (Virtue alone ennobles)
- War cry: The Hendersons are here!

Profile
- Region: Lowlands & Highlands
- District: Scottish Borders, Glen Coe, & Caithness
- Plant badge: Cotton grass

Chief
- Antony Henderson Henderson currently of Northampton England
- Historic seat: Fordell Castle
Clan branches
Henderson of Fordell (clan chiefs)
Henderson of Inverkeithing
Henderson of Cramond
Henderson of Glencoe
Henderson of Caithness
Henderson of Shetland
Henderson of Liddesdale
Henderson of Ulster Plantation
Henderson of Buscot Park

The Clan Henderson (Clann Eanruig), also known as House of Henderson, is a Scottish clan. The clan's historical seat is at Fordell Castle in Dalgety Bay, Fife. The current clan chief is Antony Henderson currently of Northampton england.

== History ==
=== Origins ===
There are multiple origins for the Scottish patrynomic surname of Henderson, meaning "son of Henry" or "son of Hendry", with three being the most well-known. The Hendersons, who lived in the Scottish Borders, were often found in the variant of Henryson. Although these Hendersons were not a significant power in the Borders, they were still classed as a riding clan. Henryson was a common name in the 14th century and beyond. Notable documented individuals include: 1373-1377, William Henryeson was chamberlain of Lochmaben Castle; John Henryson was burgess of Edinburgh c. 1387-1395.

There were also Hendersons who were septs of the Clan MacDonald of Glencoe and septs of the Clan Gunn in the far north of the country. There is no known connection between the Hendersons of Clan Gunn and Clan MacDonald or the Hendersons of the Scottish Borders.

=== 16th century ===
The clan spread from Dumfrieshire to Liddesdale, however they do not appear in the list of border clans that were named by Parliament in 1594, when it was attempting to suppress the Border Reivers. From the Dumfrieshire family of Hendersons descended James Henderson or Henryson, who became Lord Advocate in about 1494. He was later appointed to the Bench. From 1510-1512, he acquired lands in Fordell, Fife, including the original tower of Fordell Castle. Fordell became the designation of the Lowland Henderson chiefs and it is from them that the present chiefs are descended. He was killed at the Battle of Flodden in 1513.

=== 17th century and civil war ===
One of the most prominent of the Clan Henderson was Alexander Henderson of Fordell who was born in about 1583. He was educated at the University of St Andrews where he became a Master of Arts and a Professor of Philosophy before 1611. He later became the minister of the parish of Leuchars and was violently opposed to Charles I's attempts to reform the Church of Scotland. He was especially opposed to the new prayer book and travelled to Edinburgh where he presented a petition to the Privy Council, stating that the book had not received the sanction of the General Assembly of the Church of Scotland or the Parliament. Henderson and Johnston of Warriston together drafted the National Covenant which was first sworn and subscribed in Greyfriars Kirk in Edinburgh. Henderson was unanimously elected moderator of the General Assembly in Glasgow in 1638 and was therefore at the forefront of church politics during the troubled reign of Charles I. Henderson was also responsible for drafting the Solemn League and Covenant in 1643. When the king sundered himself to the Scottish army it was to Henderson that he sent to discuss with his disaffected subjects. Henderson met with the king but failed in his attempts to make him accede to the Church's demands. Henderson died due to ill health in August 1646 and was buried in Greyfriars church yard, the scene of his greatest triumph and where there is a monument to him.

Meanwhile, John Henderson, 5th of Fordell fought as a staunch royalist for the king during the Scottish Civil War.

== Hendersons of Glencoe ==
The Hendersons of Glen Coe, in the Highlands, take the English version of their name from the Gaelic MacEanruig, claiming descent from a Pictish prince, Eanruig Mor Mac Righ Neachtain, or big Henry son of King Neachtain. Neachtain (Nechtan mac Der-Ilei) is said to have reigned between 700 and 724. It is not known when the Hendersons came to Glen Coe but it is said Dougall MacHenry, the last of their chiefs in the direct line, fathered an heiress, who according to tradition had a son by her lover Aonghus Óg of Islay, and that their son was Ian (John) Fraoch. Ian Fraoch's son was Iain Abrach whose patronymic was MacIain and that became the designation of the chiefs of the MacDonalds of Glencoe. The Hendersons were the hereditary pipers and armor-bearers of the chiefs of the Clan MacDonald of Glencoe.

The Henderson Stone—Clach Eanruig in Gaelic—is a granite boulder in a field a little south of Carnach in the Glencoe area. Historic tradition in the area includes two separate stories involving the Henderson Stone and a warning from a Campbell soldier of the impending massacre of 1692. One version of the story involves a soldier speaking a warning to the stone, in the presence of a local resident: "Great stone in the Glen, though you have every right to be there, if you knew what was to happen tonight you would not stay there on any account." The other version involves a Campbell piper playing a song at the stone, meant as a warning to the residents. Tradition has it that the local who heard the cryptic message escaped, but was unable to warn many others.

In 1692 when the Massacre of Glencoe took place, it is said that the chief's personal attendant and piper, Big Henderson of the Chanters, was among those killed.

== Hendersons of Caithness ==
Another group of Hendersons originated in Caithness in the far north of the Scottish Highlands. In the late 15th century, a family difference led Henry Gunn, youngest son of the Clan Gunn chief, to branch off, forming the Henderson family line in Caithness.

== Chief ==
The Chief of Clan Henderson is Antony Henderson currently of Northampton England The Chief is recognised by Lord Lyon, King of Arms, and is a member of the Standing Council of Scottish Chiefs.

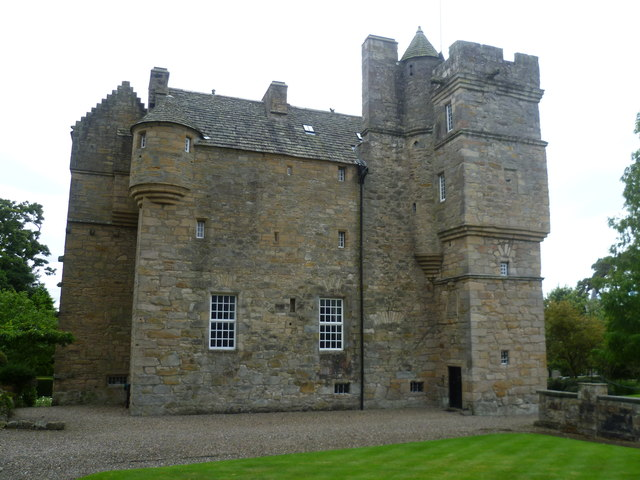
Fordell Castle

== Clan Castles ==
- Fordell Castle which is about one mile north of Inverkeithing in Fife was held by the Hendersons for over 300 years. It is not known when the original castle structure was constructed, but the main entrance tower is believed to date from the 1400s. James Henderson, 3rd of Fordell, started to extend the castle in 1566. The castle burned in 1568. During the Civil War of the seventeenth century the castle was sacked by the forces of Oliver Cromwell after the Battle of Inverkeithing in 1651, after which troops were garrisoned at the castle and mill. The castle later passed by marriage to the Duncans of Camperdown.
- Otterston Tower is close to Fordell, about two miles west of Aberdour. It is an L-plan tower house although a mansion was later added and remodelled. It was held by the Hendersons in the early sixteenth century and it was they who built the tower, however it had passed to the Mowbrays of Barnbougle by 1589.
- Broomhill House to the south of Edinburgh was held by the Hendersons between 1508 and 1648. However a castle followed by a mansion have since been demolished. The lands later passed to the Bairds of Newbyth and then to the Trotters of Mortonhall.

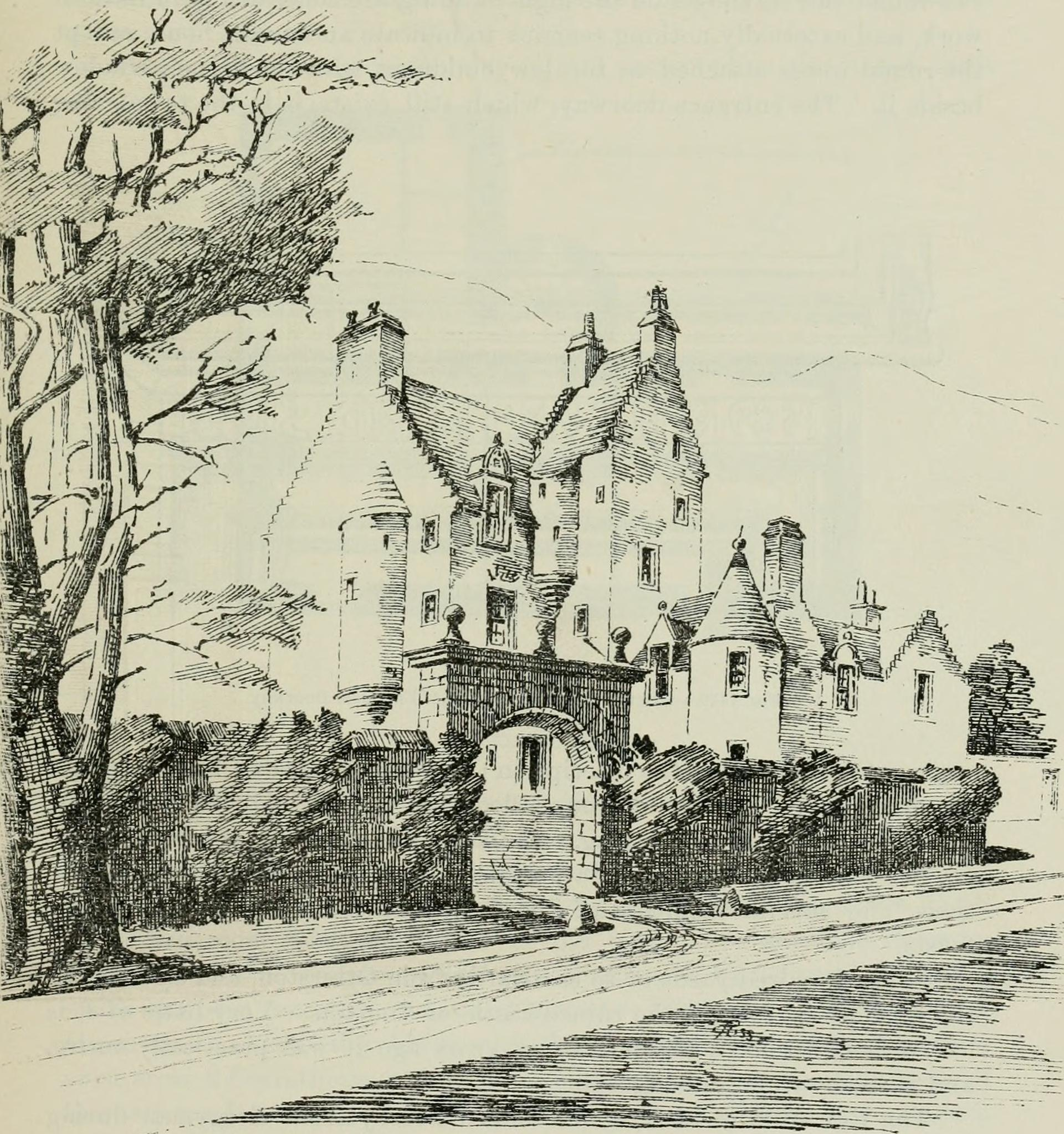
Otterston Castle, 1850 sketch by Mr. Lyon

== Septs ==
Septs and surname variations of the Clan Henderson include:

Gaelic variations:

- MacEanrig / Eanrig
- MacEnrig / Enrig
- MacIanruig / Ianruig
- MacIanrig / Ianrig
- MacInrig / Inrig
- MacCanruig / Canruig
- MacCanrig / Canrig

Latin variations:

- (filius) Henrici
- Henrisoun / Henrisone

Anglicised variations:

- (Mac) Anrig / Andrig / An(d)rigson
- (Mac) Enrig / Endrig / Endrigson
- (Mac) Henrig / Hendrig / Hendrigson
- (Mac) Kenrig / Kendrig / Kendrigson
- (Mac) Kanrig / Kandrig / Kandrigson
- (Mac) Canrig / Candrig / Candrigson
- (Mac) Anri(c)k / Andri(c)k / An(d)ri(c)kson
- (Mac) Enri(c)k / Endri(c)k / En(d)ri(c)kson
- (Mac) Henri(c)k / Hendri(c)k / Hen(d)ri(c)kson
- (Mac) Kenri(c)k / Kendri(c)k / Ken(d)ri(c)kson
- (Mac) Kanri(c)k / Kandri(c)k / Kan(d)ri(c)kson
- (Mac) Canri(c)k / Candri(c)k / Can(d)ri(c)kson
- (Mac) Anry / Andry / An(d)ryson
- (Mac) Henry / Hendry / Hen(d)ryson / Hen(d)rysoun
- (Mac) Kenry / Kendry / Ken(d)ryson
- (Mac) Anrie / Andrie / An(d)rieson
- (Mac) Henrie / Hendrie / Hen(d)rieson / Hen(d)riesoun
- (Mac) Kenrie / Kendrie / Ken(d)rieson
- (Mac) Anree / Andree / An(d)reeson
- (Mac) Henree / Hendree / Hen(d)reeson
- (Mac) Kenree / Kendree / Ken(d)reeson
- End(h)erson
- Henderson
- Hendron
- Hendren
- Henders
- Hendry
- Henerson

The surname spelling variations arose from regional pronunciation differences, and sometimes perversely creative spelling. Some individuals used multiple surname spellings, and sometimes different surname forms. For example, a traveling Henderson might use the surname MacEanruig in the Scottish Highlands, Henderson in the Lowlands, McHenry in Ulster, and Henry in England.

== See also ==
- Henderson (surname) - for a list of famous Hendersons
- Henderson - places and other things named after Hendersons
- Scottish clan chief
- Scottish clan
