= Lochaber =

Ward management area of the Highland Council

Coordinates: 57°N 5°W

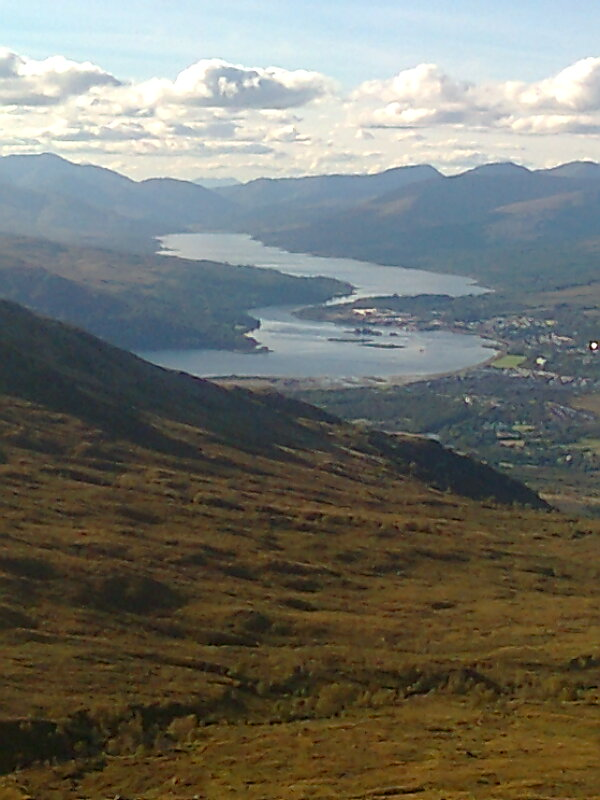
Loch Eil

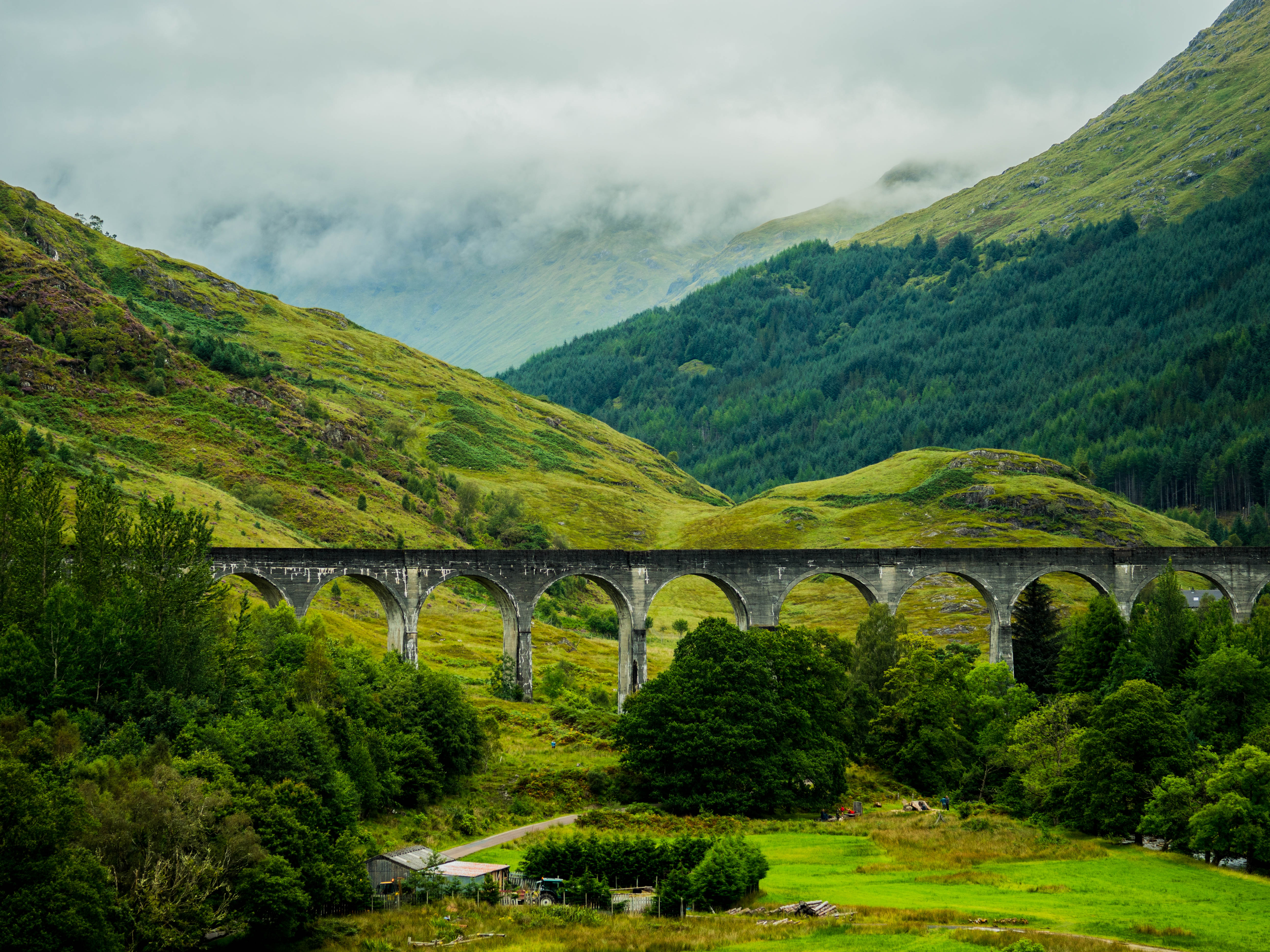
The viaduct at Glenfinnan

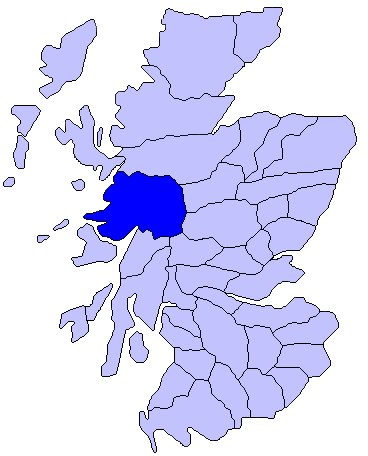
Map of Scotland showing the historic province of Lochaber

Lochaber (/lɒxˈɑːbər/ lokh-AH-bər; Scottish Gaelic: Loch Abar) is a name applied to a part of the Scottish Highlands. Historically, it was a provincial lordship consisting of the parishes of Kilmallie and Kilmonivaig. Lochaber once extended from the Northern shore of Loch Leven, a district called Nether Lochaber, to beyond Spean Bridge and Roybridge, which area is known as Brae Lochaber or Braigh Loch Abar in Gaelic. For local government purposes, the name was used for one of the landward districts of Inverness-shire from 1930 to 1975, and then for one of the districts of the Highland region from 1975 to 1996. Since 1996 the Highland Council has had a Lochaber area committee.

The main town of Lochaber is Fort William. Other moderate sized settlements in Lochaber include Mallaig, Ballachulish and Glencoe.

== Name ==
William Watson outlined two schools of thought on this topic. He favoured the idea that Abar came from the Pictish and Welsh for "river mouth" and that Loch Abar meant the confluence of the Lochy and the Nevis as they flowed into Loch Linnhe, an Linne Dhubh in Gaelic. He also conceded that abar might also come from the Gaelic eabar, meaning "mud" or "swampy place". Thus Lochaber could be the "loch of swamps", a historic water feature that existed on the Blàr Mòr, where the area's High School and Health Centre are situated today. Other experts favour the "swamp" derivation. A Lochaber person is called an Abrach.

== History ==
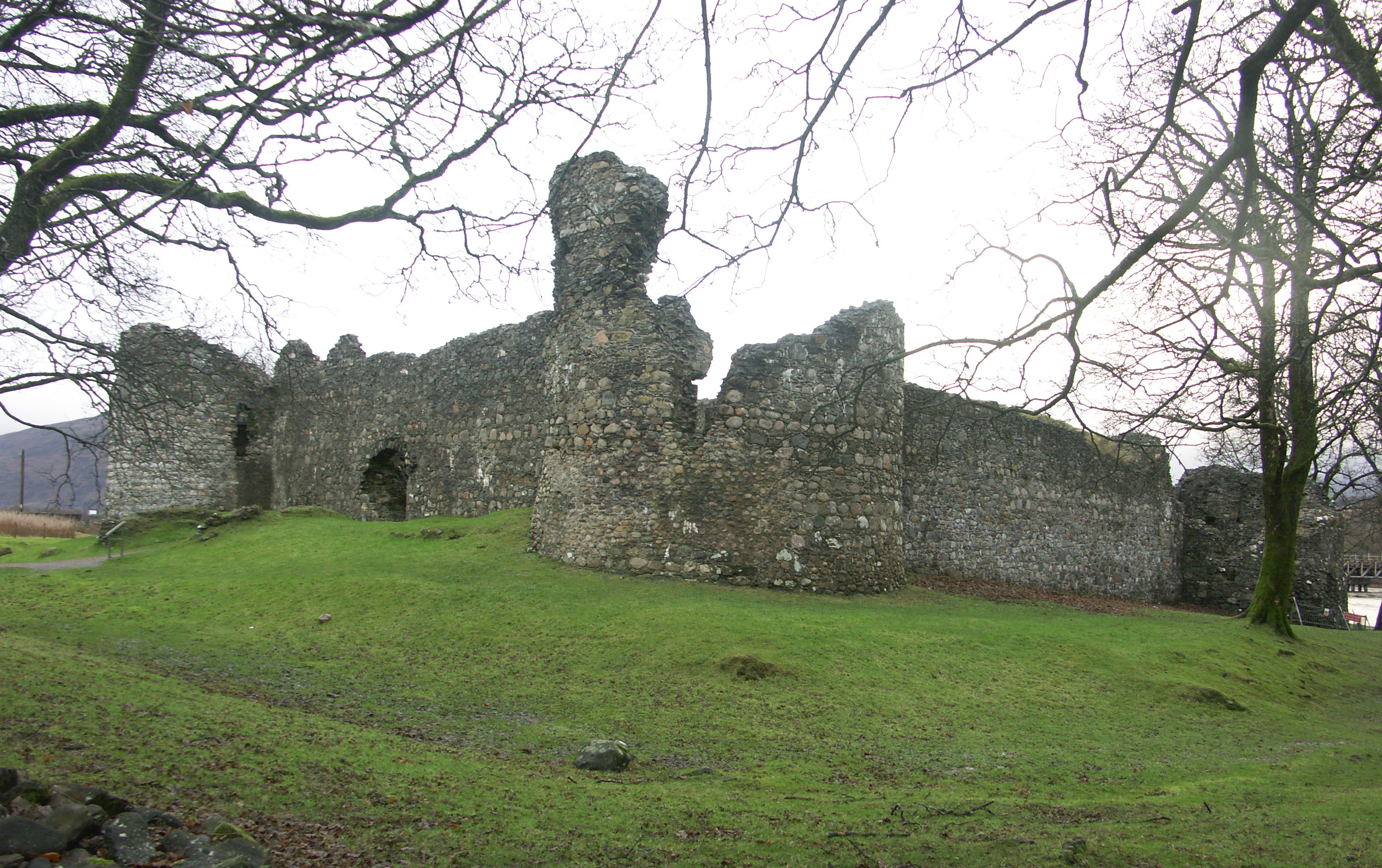
Inverlochy Castle, caput of the provincial lordship of Lochaber and site of a possible earlier Pictish settlement

Lochaber is first recorded in the Life of Columba written in c. 690 by Adomnán, the Abbot of Iona Abbey. Although there are no known Pictish stones within the area, Ardnamurchan Point is believed to have marked the boundary between the lands ruled by the Picts to the north and east, and those ruled by migrating Irish clans in Dál Riata to the south.

Archaeological evidence of earlier structures supports the tradition that Inverlochy Castle was built on the site of an earlier Pictish settlement, described by the historian Hector Boece in 1526 as a "city ... much frequented with merchants of France and Spain", but destroyed by the Vikings. Lochaber contains no early monastic locations, but the numerous placenames starting with the element "Kil-" or "Cille-" suggest early Christian sites dating from the period 600-900, while the placename element "annat" found near Corpach suggests the site of an early mother church. Placename evidence also suggests the presence of Viking settlements in the Morvern and Ballachulish areas, but nowhere north and east of Fort William.

Lochaber formed part of the Province of Moray from the early 12th century at the latest. It was first recorded as a provincial lordship at the end of the 13th century, but a "Steward of Lochaber" is recorded witnessing a charter sealed by Walter Comyn, Lord of Badenoch in 1234, suggesting that Lochaber had already been granted as a lordship by that date, and had probably, like Badenoch, been granted to Comyn by Alexander II in 1229.

It was therefore one of the seven lordships created within Moray by ca. 1230 that as well as Badenoch included The Aird, Glencarnie, Abernethy, Stratha'an and Strathbogie. The lordship was made up of the two parishes of Kilmallie and Kilmonivaig and had its caput at Inverlochy Castle.

Lochaber was one of the territories that King Robert the Bruce gave to his friend, Angus Òg Macdonald, Lord of the Isles, who fought by his side during the First Scottish War of Independence, including the successful Battle of Bannockburn in 1314. In turn, Angus Òg gave Ardnamurchan to his younger brother, Iain Sprangach MacDonald (first Chief of Clan MacDonald of Ardnamurchan), and he gave his illegitimate son, Iain Fraoch MacDonald the Chiefdom of Clan MacDonald of Glencoe. In 1376, King Robert II confirmed John of Islay, Lord of the Isles and son of Angus Òg MacDonald, control of Colonsay, Kintyre and Knapdale and granted Lochaber to John and his new wife Princess Margaret as a part of her dowry. In turn, John of Islay's son, Reginald, (first Chief of Clanranald and Glengarry), through his first marriage of Amie MacRuari, were given charter to the old lands of Clann Ruaidhrí in Lochaber. Jogn of Islay's other son, Donald of Islay, Lord of the Isles, gave the province to his brother, Alistair Carragh Macdonald, who became both the Lord of Lochaber and the 1st Chief of Clan MacDonald of Keppoch.

In the Middle Ages, Clan Cameron was the principal and dominant Scottish clan in Lochaber. Other important clans included: MacDonald of Keppoch, MacDonell of Glengarry, MacMillan and MacIntosh. To enforce Scots Law, the old province of Moray was also divided into shires (areas administered by a sheriff). The western parts of Moray, including the provincial lordships of Lochaber, Badenoch and the Aird were included in Inverness-shire, being the area administered by the Sheriff of Inverness. Over time the shires were given more administrative functions, whereas the old provinces and provincial lordships gradually lost their functions. Timber from Lochaber was shipped to Edinburgh to mount the cannons of James V at Edinburgh Castle in September 1532.

=== Seventeenth to nineteenth centuries ===
Some historians argue the late seventeenth-century Scottish Highlands were more peaceful than often suggested, in part because chiefs could be fined for crimes committed by their clansmen. The exception was Lochaber, identified as a refuge for cattle raiders and thieves by government officials, other chiefs and Gaelic poets. Four local clans were consistently named in such accounts: the Glencoe and Keppoch MacDonalds, the MacGregors and the Camerons. In September 1688, James VII outlawed the Keppoch MacDonalds for attacking his troops at the Battle of Mulroy, shortly before he was deposed by the November 1688 Glorious Revolution.

Beginning in 1740, Lochaber was the residence of Fr. Alexander Cameron, a nobleman from Clan Cameron and outlawed Roman Catholic priest of the Society of Jesus. For five years prior to the Uprising of 1745, Fr. Cameron's secret residence was located under the cliff of a big boulder at Brae of Craskie in Glenannich, from which he and two other priests, Frs. John and Charles Farquarson, ran a highly successful vicariate in both Lochaber and Strathglass for the strictly illegal and underground Catholic Church in Scotland.

Many local residents took part in the Jacobite Rising of 1745, and the reprisals inflicted by government troops after the Battle of Culloden is still referred to in the Highlands and Islands as Bliadhna nan Creach, or "Year of the Pillaging". Thereafter, the local population was further reduced by the Highland Clearances and voluntary emigration, including the poet Ailean a' Ridse MacDhòmhnaill, who emigrated and settled in Mabou, Nova Scotia in 1816. In 1900, his son Canadian Gaelic poet Alasdair a' Ridse MacDhòmhnaill wrote, "They say the best singers and Seanachies left Scotland. They left Lochaber for certain."

According to John Watts, after the estate clearances ordered by Laird Ranald George Macdonald at the height of the Highland Potato Famine and their assisted passage to Australia through the Highland and Island Emigration Society, Little River and Belmont were the main population centers in the Colony of Victoria for Roman Catholic Scottish Gaels from Lochaber and Moidart. The Gaels of Little River were joined in 1857 by their former parish priest from Scotland, Fr Ronald Rankin (c. 1785–1863), who is best known as the author of the Scottish Gaelic Christmas carol Tàladh Chrìosda.

In 1879, a visitor to Canada from Scotland enthusiastically declared that the Lochaber dialect of the Scottish Gaelic language was better preserved, "with the most perfect accent, and with scarcely any, if any, admixture of English", in Glengarry County and in Cornwall, Ontario than in Lochaber itself.

=== Recent history ===
In 2023, Lochaber, with Ben Nevis, was put forward as a potential new National Park, however it was not successful in its bid.

== Governance ==
There has been no administrative area called Lochaber since 1996, but the Highland Council has a committee area called Lochaber. The committee comprises the councillors representing the two wards of Fort William and Ardnamurchan and Caol and Mallaig, which together cover broadly the same area as the pre-1996 Lochaber District.

=== Administrative history ===
The medieval lordship of Lochaber was never explicitly abolished, but more significant administrative functions were gradually given to other bodies, particularly the Sheriff of Inverness, the Commissioners of Supply for Inverness-shire established in 1667, and then the Inverness-shire County Council created in 1890. Lochaber's main town of Fort William was governed as a police burgh with a town council from 1875.

A local government district called Lochaber was created in 1930, when Scotland's parish councils were abolished. Instead of having parish councils, the landward (outside a burgh) area of each county was divided into landward districts, each with a district council. The Lochaber district created in 1930 covered the parts of the parishes of Kilmallie and Kilmonivaig which lay outside the burgh of Fort William, plus the three parishes of Arisaig and Moidart, Glenelg, and Small Isles. Although the Lochaber district created in 1930 did not include the burgh of Fort William, the district council nevertheless established its offices in the town.

Lochaber
- District
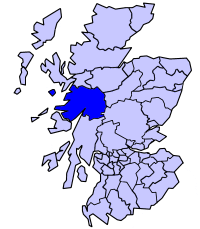
- History
  - Created: 16 May 1975
  - Abolished: 31 March 1996
  - Succeeded by: Highland
  - HQ: Fort William
- Contained within
  - Region: Highland Region

Local government in Scotland was reformed again in 1975 under the Local Government (Scotland) Act 1973, which abolished Scotland's counties, burghs and landward districts and replaced them with a two-tier system of regions and districts. One of the new districts was also called Lochaber, covering the combined area of the former Lochaber district plus the burgh of Fort William from Inverness-shire, plus the Ardnamurchan district and the Ballachulish and Kinlochleven electoral divisions from Argyll. The post-1975 Lochaber District Council was a district-level authority, with regional-level functions provided by the Highland Regional Council, based in Inverness.

The boundaries of the district created in 1975 included Glen Coe, Nether Lochaber, the western part of the Rannoch Moor, the Road to the Isles, Moidart, Ardgour, Morvern, Sunart, Ardnamurchan, and the Small Isles (Rùm, Eigg, Muck and Canna).

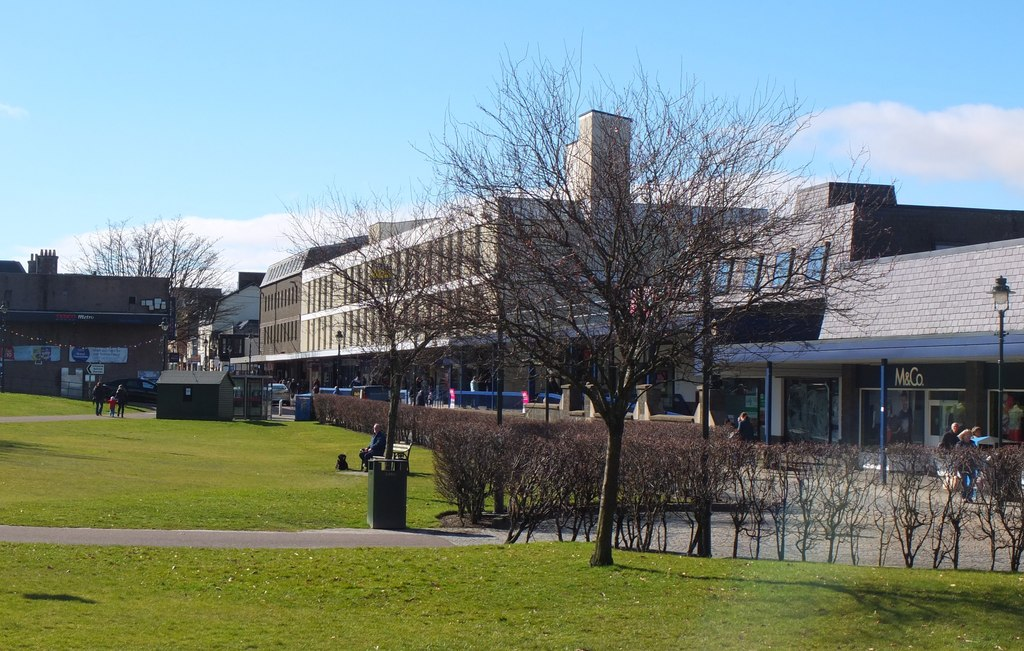
Tweeddale (lighter building behind trees) and Lochaber House (brown building to left of Tweeddale): Lochaber District Council's offices

Throughout the district council's existence from 1975 to 1996 a majority of the seats were held by independents. The council was initially based at Tweeddale, before moving to the neighbouring Lochaber House in 1979, both being adjoining 1970s office buildings with shops on the ground floor on the High Street in Fort William. Tweeddale subsequently served as the area office for the Highland Regional Council.

The districts and regions created in 1975 were abolished in 1996, under the Local Government etc. (Scotland) Act 1994 and replaced with single-tier council areas. The Highland region became one of the new council areas.

== Cultural references ==
The Shakespearean character Banquo was Thane of Lochaber and a kinsman of his friend Macbeth. His home is reputed to have been at Tor Castle above the River Lochy, near Seangan.

"Lochaber No More" is a traditional folk song, first compiled in 1760 — with additional lyrics penned by Allan Ramsay in the 1720s — but with a melody also known in Ireland (where it may very well have originated) as "Lament for Limerick" or "Limerick's Lamentation". The melody was also popular in England — used in "Amintor's Lamentation for Celia's Unkindness", a broadside ballad from the 19th century. The phrase "Lochaber no more" is borrowed by The Proclaimers as the start of the bridge in their hit song about the Scottish clearances "Letter From America".

According to legend, a glaistig, a ghostly woman-goat hybrid, once lived in the area.

=== Columba ===
Lochaber is mentioned by Adomnan of Iona in his biography of St Columba on two occasions. Both stories are related to Columba using his saintly blessing to raise people out of poverty and make them wealthier.

== Infrastructure ==
=== Hospital ===
The main hospital in Lochaber is Belford Hospital in Fort William. In 2023 exploratory work began to replace the hospital, with construction expected to begin in the Blar Mhor area near Caol in 2025, with an estimated completion date of 2028. In 2024 funding issues resulted in a potential delay for the construction of the new hospital with protests taking place in Fort William.

=== Hydroelectric scheme ===
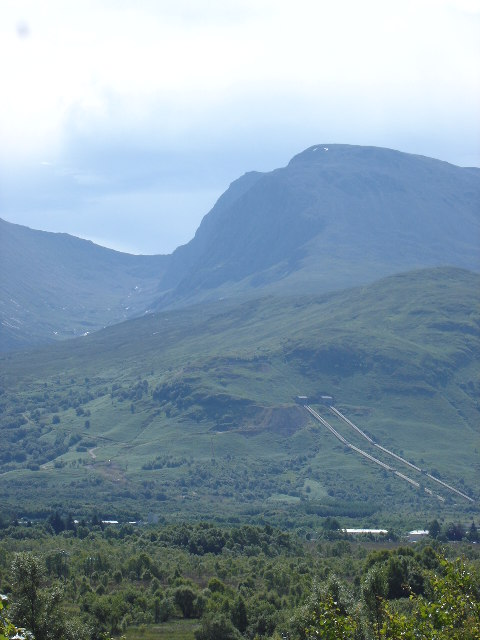
Penstocks carrying water to the aluminium smelter at Fort William

The Lochaber hydroelectric scheme is a hydroelectric power generation project constructed in the Lochaber area after World War I.

== See also ==
- Lochaber axe
- Lochaber Narrow Gauge Railway
