= Chia Meng Ann =

Singaporean educator (1930–2019)

Chia Meng Ann

Chia Meng Ann (Chinese: 谢明安; 1929 or 1930 – 15 July 2019) was a Singaporean educator. He served as the headmaster of the Ahmad Ibrahim Secondary School from 1965 to 1982 and of Bukit Merah Secondary School from 1982 to 1988. Under his tenure, the former became the first secondary school in the country to offer a mainstream education programme catering toward the visually impaired.

== Early life education ==
Chia was born around 1930. A student at the St. Andrew's School in Singapore in the late 1940s, he sat for and passed the Second Division London Matriculation Examination in January 1950. He then enrolled in the University of Malaya, from which he graduated in 1955 with a Bachelor of Arts degree.

== Career ==
At the start of 1965, Chia was appointed to the post of headmaster at the Ahmad Ibrahim Secondary School (AISS), one of the first co-educational government secondary schools to offer both the English and Chinese streams as an 'integrated' school, succeeding the founding principal Leong Chin Toon. Shortly after assuming the post, he claimed to have "[drilled] the importance of integration into the heads of [his] staff and students."

As principal, he reportedly "firmly believed in an open and inclusive education system". In 1967, AISS introduced a programme in which visually impaired students would study alongside "sighted" students, becoming the first secondary school in Singapore to offer a mainstream education to those who were visually impaired. Prior to this, these students would have to enrol in the Princess Elizabeth School, located across the Causeway in Johor Bahru, Malaysia, to receive their secondary education. As there were then no textbooks for the visually impaired in Singapore, the school worked with the Singapore Association for the Blind to translate textbooks into braille. In its first year, the programme took in five students. A teaching assistant was sent from the local Ministry of Education. On Chia's request, the local branch of the Lions Club donated magnifying glasses to the school for the programme. In 1971, the school had 12 visually impaired students, with Chia stating that the school had "no problems in having the blind with [them]. Students help them in schoolwork as part of their extra-curricular activities." He felt that "sighted" children also benefitted from this programme as they would "learn to care for and be tolerant towards the handicapped." By 1980, visually impaired students were automatically enrollled in the school after taking their Primary School Leaving Examination. AISS remained the only secondary school to take in visually impaired students until 1982.

At AISS, Chia also found that the students were falling behind in English. To fix this, he made the students correct their own mistakes when marking. Other changes included the introduction of remedial lessons for the subject, asking students to read a book which they would then exchange with another student every few weeks, and providing students with materials such as model essays and "good newspaper articles." From 1980 to 1981, the school's passing rate in English rose from 56% to 73%. In 1981, Chia was appointed to the newly established Schools Council, serving on it for two terms

It was then announced that Chia was to be transferred to the Bukit Merah Secondary School (BMSS) in early 1982. A farewell was held at AISS on 10 February; this was attended by his successor, educator Bhajan Singh, previously a consultant with the Singapore School for the Blind. By then, Chia had served in the post for 17 years. Shortly after stepping down, he assumed the post of principal at BMSS, succeeding Mok Choon Hoe, who had been appointed a senior inspector with the Ministry of Education. He found that the students at BMSS, who often spoke Mandarin or dialects at home, typically had a "very poor grasp of the English language, especially grammar and syntax." He then implemented the same changes he had made to help improve students' performance in English at AISS. The school's pass rate for English at the 'O'-Level Examinations rose from 21% to 39% from 1981 to 1982. Chia retired in 1988, after which he was succeeded by Joseph Ng. He was conferred the Long Service Medal at the 1989 National Day Awards.

== Personal life and death ==
Chia was married. He died on 15 July 2019. The funeral was attended by several former students, including many of those who had gone through his programme for the visually impaired. He was then buried at the Christian Cemetery at Choa Chu Kang on 17 July.
