= Hendersonville =

Hendersonville may refer to:

== Places ==
=== United States ===
- Hendersonville, Mississippi, an early settlement (extinct town) in Yalobusha County, Mississippi
- Hendersonville, North Carolina, a town south-east of Asheville
- Hendersonville, Pennsylvania, a suburb of Pittsburgh
- Hendersonville, South Carolina, an unincorporated community
- Hendersonville, Tennessee, a suburb of Nashville
- Hendersonville, Virginia, a defunct town
