= Judge Henderson =

Judge Henderson may refer to:

- Albert H. Henderson (1893–1951), judge of the New York Surrogate's Court
- Albert John Henderson (1920–1999), judge of the United States Courts of Appeals for the Fifth Circuit and the Eleventh Circuit
- David Ezekiel Henderson (1879–1968), judge of the United States District Court for the Western District of North Carolina
- John Oliver Henderson (1909–1974), judge of the United States District Court for the Western District of New York
- Karen L. Henderson (born 1944), judge of the United States Court of Appeals for the District of Columbia Circuit
- Thelton Henderson (born 1933), judge of the United States District Court for the Northern District of California

== See also ==
- Justice Henderson (disambiguation)
