= Henderson Stone =

- Clach Eanruig (Scottish Gaelic)
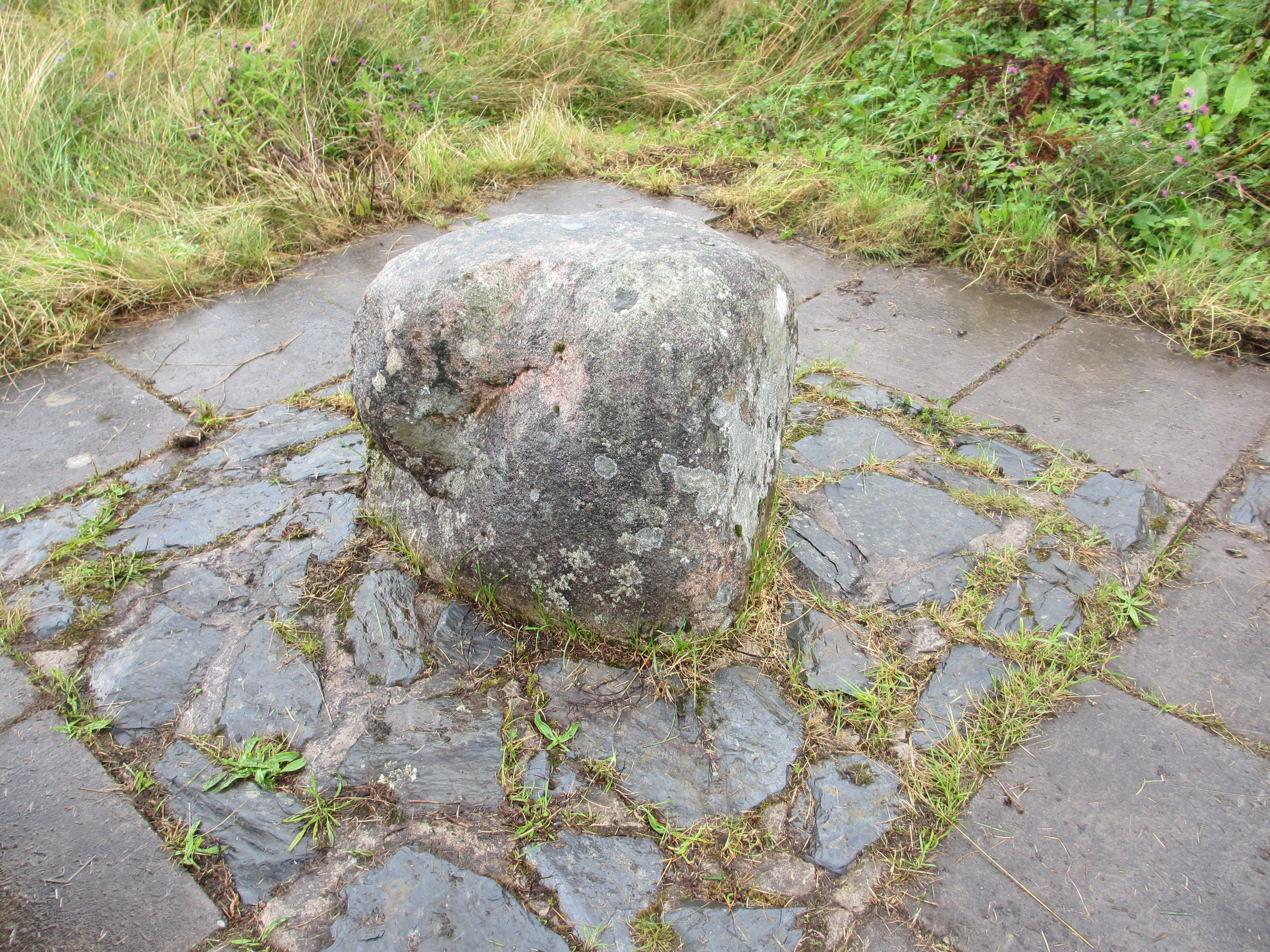

- Location within Highland
- 56.6812°N 5.096°W
- OS grid reference: NN 10443 58668

The Henderson Stone (Clach Eanruig in Scottish Gaelic) is a granite boulder in a field in the Glencoe (Carnoch) area of Scotland. Clach Eanruig is translated alternatively as Henderson Stone or Henry's Stone.

== History ==
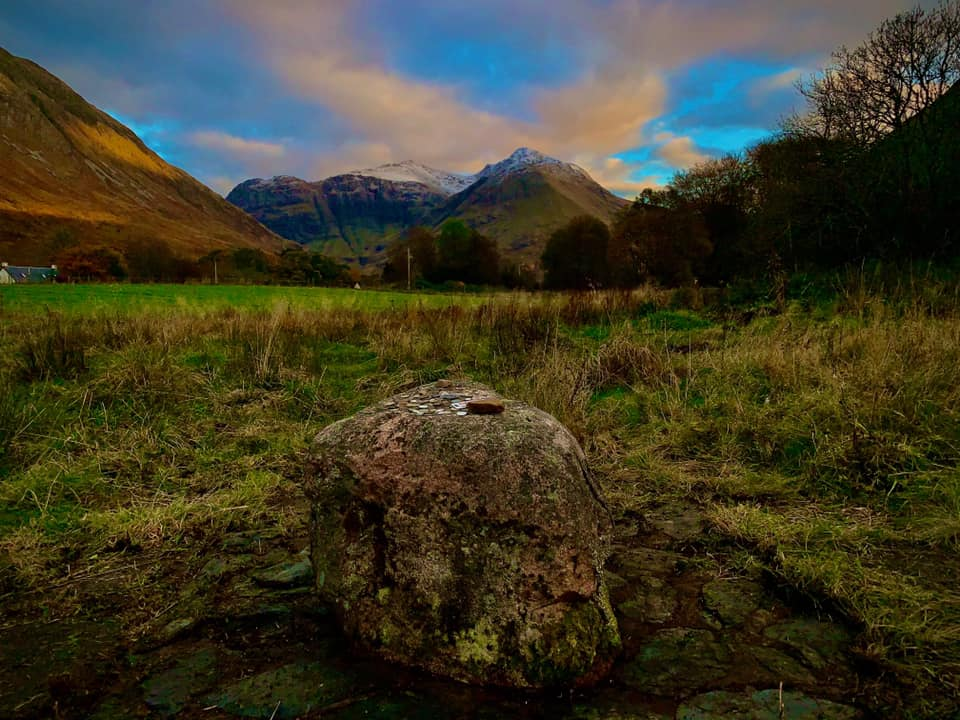
View of the stone with fields and hills behind

Oral tradition in the area includes stories involving the Henderson Stone and a warning from a Campbell soldier of the impending Massacre of Glencoe in 1692. Although the details vary from one version of the story to another, each version has certain commonalities. Legend has it one of the soldiers, who had been billeted with the Clan MacDonald of Glencoe for ten days, knew of the order to kill the MacDonalds early the next morning. He sought to warn his host of the impending massacre. While walking with the local, the soldier speaks a warning directly to the stone. The exact wording of the warning statement varies by retelling, but goes something like this: "Great stone in the Glen, though you have every right to be there, if you knew what was to happen tonight you would not stay there on any account." Tradition has it that the local who heard the cryptic message to the stone escaped, but was unable to warn many others.

John Prebble, in Glencoe: the story of the massacre, analyzes the significance of the stories of the warnings at Henderson Stone in this way:

The Campbells of Argyll’s Regiment were Highland, and the inviolability of hospitality was as sacred to them as to any other clan, murder under trust was as great a sin. This is remembered in the stories which the Glencoe people told for another hundred and fifty years. Confused and contradictory though the legends became, they do record the truth that some of the Argyll men were revolted by the orders given them, and that within the oath of obedience they had taken they attempted to warn the people. . . . And for each warning remembered by the MacDonalds, there may have been another forgotten. When the order was given two hours before dawn on Saturday, there were soldiers who killed no one, who turned their backs on running shadows, who heard no frightened breathing in the dark.

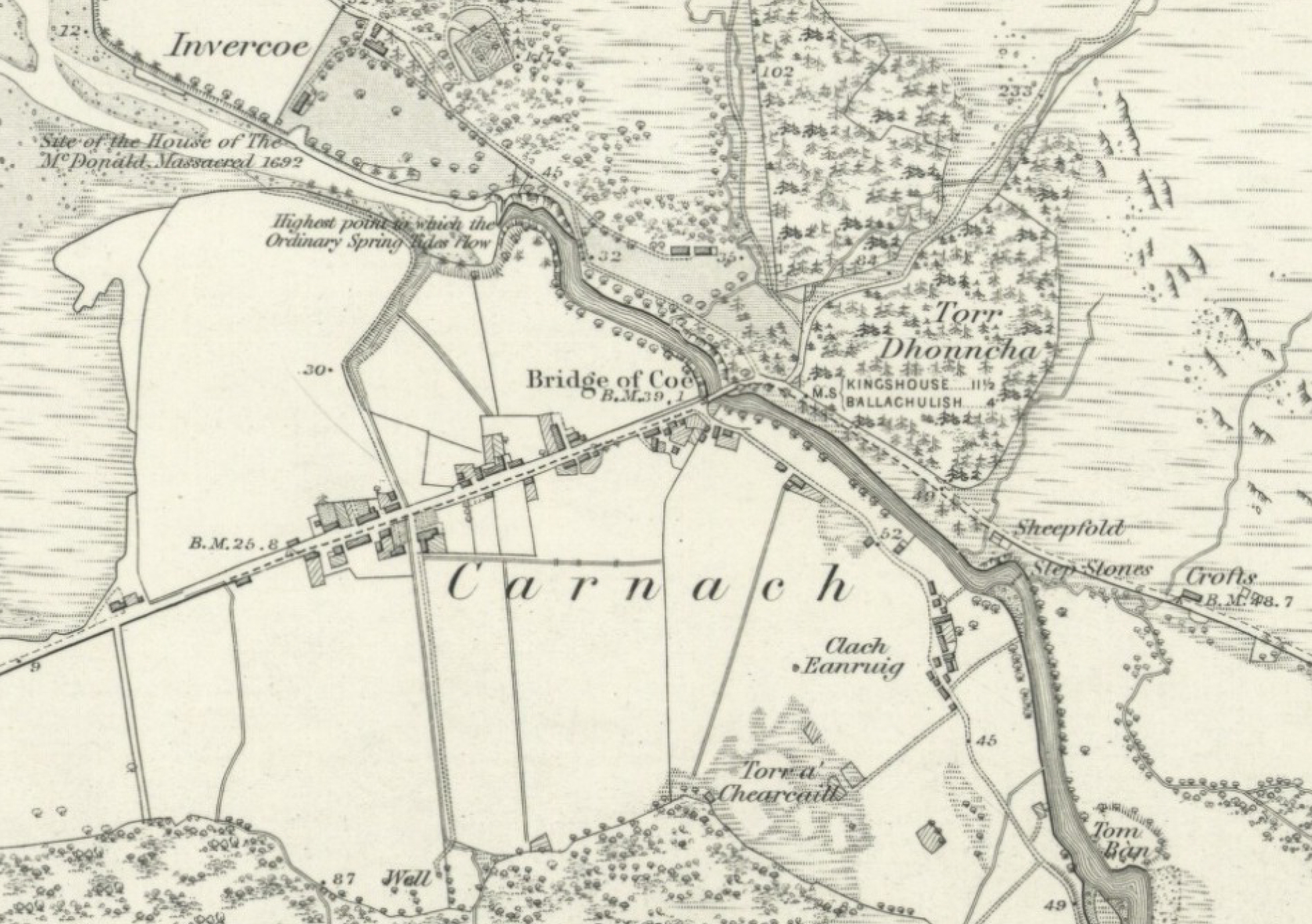
Carnach area of Glen Coe as shown on 1870 Ordnance Survey, https://maps.nls.uk/view/74427313

A commemorative sign has been located at the Henderson Stone since at least 1870. Commemorations are on occasion held at the site of the stone.

‘The Henderson Stone’ is also the name of an album of traditional Scottish songs, compiled by Philip, Nicola and Thomas Henderson, descendants of the Hendersons of the Fordell Branch (Fifeshire).

== See also ==
- List of individual rocks
