= Henderson High School =

Henderson High School may refer to:

In New Zealand

- Henderson High School, Auckland – Henderson, New Zealand

In the United States of America

- Henderson High School (Mississippi) – Starkville, Mississippi
- Henderson High School (North Carolina) – Henderson, North Carolina
- Henderson High School (Pennsylvania) – West Chester, Pennsylvania
- Henderson High School (Texas) – Henderson, Texas
- Charles Henderson High School – Troy, Alabama
- Henderson High School (Georgia) – former school in Chamblee, Georgia
- Henderson County High School – Henderson, Kentucky
- Le Sueur-Henderson Secondary School – Le Sueur, Minnesota
- East Henderson High School – East Flat Rock, North Carolina
- North Henderson High School – Hendersonville, North Carolina
- West Henderson High School – Hendersonville, North Carolina
- Henderson Independent High School – Salisbury, North Carolina

== See also ==
- Hendersonville High School (disambiguation)
