= Henderson Middle School =

Henderson Middle School may refer to:

- Henderson Middle School, DeKalb County School District, DeKalb County, Georgia, US
- Henderson Middle School, El Paso Independent School District, El Paso, Texas, US
- Henderson Middle School, Vance County Public Schools, Henderson, North Carolina, US
- Henderson Middle School, Henderson Independent School District, Henderson, Texas, US
- Henderson Middle School, Hardin-Jefferson Independent School District, Hardin County, Texas, US
- Henderson Middle School, Butts County Schools, Jackson, Georgia, US

== See also ==
- Mary Ellen Henderson Middle School, Falls Church City Public Schools, Idylwood, Virginia, US
- Thomas H. Henderson Middle School, Richmond Public Schools, Richmond, Virginia, US
- Henderson Health Sciences Magnet Middle School, Little Rock School District, Little Rock, Arkansas, US
