= Henderson Secondary School =

- Sekolah Menengah Henderson 达善中学

Location
- 100 Henderson Road, Singapore 159544; Singapore; 1.2853537°N 103.8173491°E

Information
- Type: Government
- Motto: Education for Life
- Established: 1974
- Status: Merged into Bukit Merah Secondary
- Closed: 2017
- School district: Bukit Merah
- Session: Single-session
- School code: 3016
- Gender: Co-educational
- Colours: Red and Blue
- Team name: Hendersonian
- Uniform Colours: White , Dark Blue

Henderson Secondary School (Abbreviation: HSS; Chinese: 达善中学; pinyin: Dá Shān Zhōng Xúe) was a co-educational, single session, government school in Bukit Merah, Singapore and was established in 1974. It was located at 100 Henderson Road, Singapore 159544. It was closed and merged with Bukit Merah Secondary School in 2017.

== History ==
=== Established ===
Henderson Secondary School was established in 1974 on Friendly Hill at Preston Road. There were only 600 Secondary One students with 24 teachers and was headed by Mr. Gan Kee Soon.

On 17 September 1976, the new school compound, which cost more than S$2 million to build, was officially opened by the then-Parliamentary Secretary for Home Affairs and MP for Bukit Merah, Mr. Lim Guan Hoo.

In 1994, the school shifted to a temporary holding campus in 31 Queensway to make way for the rebuilding of the campus in Henderson Road. On 8 November 1997, the school held a homecoming event where all the students and the principal took a walk from the temporary school back to the new campus.

On 17 April 1999, an opening ceremony was held at the school to officially declared open by then Mayor and MP for Tanjong Pagar GRC, Mr. Ow Chin Hock.

=== Merger ===
In 2017, Henderson Secondary was merged into Bukit Merah Secondary due to reduced enrolment in both schools.

The former premises of Henderson Secondary was, in 2018, taken over by the Singapore Land Authority (SLA) to be transformed into pre-school, nursing home and urban farm.

== Principals ==
Principal	Years served
Mr. Gan Kee Soon	1974-1979
Mr. T P Naidu	1979-1981
Mdm. Lau Kan How	1981-1988
Mr. N Subramaniam	1988-1996
Mrs. Ho Woon Ho	1996-2000
Mrs. Yeo Chin Nam	2000-2008
Mr. Simen Lourds	2009-2016

== Identity & heritage ==
=== School song ===
The school song of Henderson Secondary School was composed in 1974 by Mr. Michael Habib Sim, then a Science and English teacher.

=== School badge ===
The school badge is in the shape of a shield. Within the shield, there is an open book which signifies knowledge; a flame, which Hendersonians aspire to keep ablaze; and an upright figure that represents Youth and Life.

Below the shield is the school motto: Education For Life

=== School colours ===
The colours of the school are Red and Blue where red signifies loyalty and fortitude and blue signifies moral and intellectual strength.

== Cultural exchange ==
The school was host to twenty visiting students from Pengiran Jaya Negara Pengiran Haji Abdulud Bakar Secondary School in Brunei. 2007 was the first time that this cultural trip had taken place with secondary students.
