= Aonghus Óg of Islay =

Scottish magnate

Aonghus Óg Mac Domhnaill
- Lord of Islay
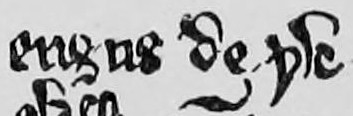
- Aonghus Óg's name as it appears in a facsimile of correspondence between him and his feudal overlord, Edward I, King of England: "Engus de Yle".
- Predecessor: Alasdair Óg Mac Domhnaill?
- Died: 1314 × 1318/c. 1330
- Buried: Iona
- Noble family: Clann Domhnaill
- Spouse: Áine Ní Chatháin
- Issue: Eóin (John of Islay); Máire; Áine? Eóin (illegitimate)
- Father: Aonghus Mór mac Domhnaill

Aonghus Óg Mac Domhnaill (died 1314 × 1318/c. 1330), or Angus Og MacDonald, was a fourteenth-century Scottish magnate and chief of Clann Domhnaill. (Note: Since the 1990s, academics have accorded Aonghus Óg various patronyms in English secondary sources: Áengus Óc Mac Domnaill, Aengus Óg Mac Domnaill, Aengus Óg MacDomhnaill, Angus Macdonald, Angus MacDonald, Angus Og mac Donald, Angus Og macDonald, Angus Óg MacDonald, Angus Og Macdonald, Angus Og MacDonald, Angus Òg MacDonald, Aonghas Óg MacDhomhnaill, Aonghas Óg MacDòmhnaill, Aonghas Óg MacDomhnaill, Aonghas Óg MacDonald, Aonghus Óg Mac Domhnaill, and Aonghus Óg MacDomnaill.) He was a younger son of Aonghus Mór mac Domhnaill, Lord of Islay. After the latter's apparent death, the chiefship of the kindred was assumed by Aonghus Óg's elder brother, Alasdair Óg Mac Domhnaill.

Most of the documentation regarding Aonghus Óg's career concerns his support of Edward I, King of England against supporters of John, King of Scotland. The latter's principal adherents on the western seaboard of Scotland were Clann Dubhghaill, regional rivals of Clann Domhnaill. Although there is much uncertainty concerning the Clann Domhnaill chiefship at this period in history, at some point after Alasdair Óg's apparent death at the hands of Clann Dubhghaill in 1299, Aonghus Óg seems to have taken up the chiefship as Lord of Islay.

Pressure from Clann Domhnaill and other supporters of the English Crown evidently compelled Clann Dubhghaill into coming onside with the English in the first years of the fourteenth century. However, when Robert Bruce VII, Earl of Carrick murdered the Scottish claimant John Comyn of Badenoch in 1306, and subsequently made himself King of Scotland (as Robert I), Clann Domhnaill seems to have switched their allegiance to Robert I in an effort to gain leverage against Clann Dubhghaill. Members of Clann Domhnaill almost certainly harboured the latter in 1306, when he was doggedly pursued by adherents of the English Crown.

Following Robert I's successful consolidation of the Scottish kingship, Aonghus Óg and other members of his kindred were rewarded with extensive grants of territories formerly held by their regional opponents. According to the late fourteenth-century Bruce, Aonghus Óg participated in the Battle of Bannockburn in 1314, Robert I's greatest victory over the English. It is uncertain when Aonghus Óg died. It could have been before or after the death of an unknown member of the clan at the Battle of Faughart in 1318—a man who seems to have held the chiefship at the time. Certainly, Eóin Mac Domhnaill—Aonghus Óg's lawful son by Áine Ní Chatháin—held the chiefship by the 1330s, and became the first member of Clann Domhnaill to rule as Lord of the Isles.

== Familial background ==
Aonghus Óg was a younger son of Aonghus Mór mac Domhnaill, Lord of Islay, chief of Clann Domhnaill. (Note: The Gaelic Óg and Mór mean "young" and "big" respectively.) The latter last appears on record in 1293, when he was listed as one of the principal landholders in Argyll. At about this period, the territories possessed by the clan comprised Kintyre, Islay, southern Jura, and perhaps Colonsay and Oronsay. Clann Domhnaill was a branch of Clann Somhairle. Other branches included Clann Dubhghaill—the senior-most—and Clann Ruaidhrí.

Aonghus Óg's mother was a member of the Caimbéalaigh kindred (the Campbells). According to Hebridean tradition preserved by the seventeenth-century Sleat History, she was a daughter of Cailéan Mór Caimbéal, a leading member of the Caimbéalaigh. (Note: The identity of this woman is unsupported by traditional genealogies of the Caimbéalaigh.) Aonghus Óg had a sister who married Domhnall Óg Ó Domhnaill, King of Tír Chonaill; another sister who married Hugh Bisset; an older brother, Alasdair Óg, who appears to have succeeded their father by 1296; and another brother, Eóin Sprangach, ancestor of the Ardnamurchan branch of Clann Domhnaill.

== In English service against King John Balliol ==
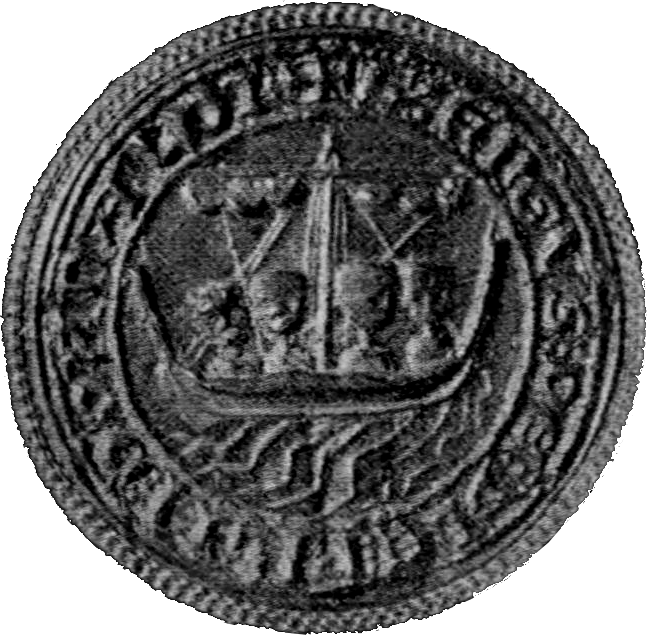
The seal of Aonghus Mór, father of Alasdair Óg and Aonghus Óg. (Note: The device appears to be similar to that which was ascribed to Aonghus Mór's paternal grandfather in the fifteenth century. The seals of Aonghus Mór and Alasdair Óg are the earliest examples of heraldry utilised by Clann Domhnaill. The legend reads "S' ENGVS DE YLE FILII DOMNALDI", whilst the seal itself is blazoned on waves, a lymphad bearing four men, not on a shield.)

When Alexander III, King of Scotland died in 1286, his acknowledged heir was his granddaughter, Margaret. Although this Norwegian girl was accepted by the magnates of the realm, and betrothed to the heir of Edward I, King of England, she perished on her journey to Scotland, and her death triggered a succession crisis.

The leading claimants to kingship were John Balliol, Lord of Galloway and Robert Bruce V, Lord of Annandale. By common consent, Edward I was invited to arbitrate the dispute. In 1292, John Balliol's claims were accepted, and he was duly inaugurated as King of Scotland. Unfortunately for this king, his ambitious English counterpart systematically undermined his royal authority, and John's reign lasted only about four years. In 1296, after John ratified a military treaty with France, and refused to hand over Scottish castles to Edward I's control, the English marched north and crushed the Scots at Dunbar. Edward I's forces proceeded forward virtually unopposed, whereupon Scotland fell under English control.

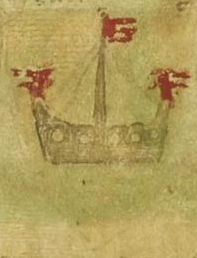
The arms of the Lord of Argyll depicted in the fourteenth-century Balliol Roll. (Note: The escutcheon is blazoned: or, a galley sable with dragon heads at prow and stern and flag flying gules, charged on the hull with four portholes argent. The coat of arms corresponds to the seal of Alasdair Mac Dubhghaill. Since the galley (lymphad) was a symbol of Clann Dubhghaill and seemingly Raghnall mac Somhairle—ancestor of Clann Ruaidhrí and Clann Domhnaill—it is conceivable that it was also a symbol of the Clann Somhairle progenitor, Somhairle mac Giolla Brighde. It was also a symbol of the Crovan dynasty, which could mean that it passed to Somhairle's family through his wife.)

The chief of Clann Dubhghaill in the last quarter of the thirteenth century and first decade of the next was Alasdair Mac Dubhghaill, Lord of Argyll. The wife of this pre-eminent magnate—and mother of Eóin Mac Dubhghaill, his son and successor—was almost certainly a member of the Comyn kindred, a family closely bound to the Balliol family.

During the short Balliol regime, Alasdair Mac Dubhghaill had been appointed Sheriff of Lorn, a position which made him the Scottish Crown's representative throughout much of the western seaboard, including Clann Domhnaill and Caimbéalaigh territories. If tradition preserved by the seventeenth-century Ane Accompt of the Genealogie of the Campbells is to be believed, Clann Dubhghaill overcame and slew Cailéan Mór in the 1290s. Certainly, Alasdair Mac Dubhghaill came into bloody conflict with his Clann Domhnaill counterpart during the decade.

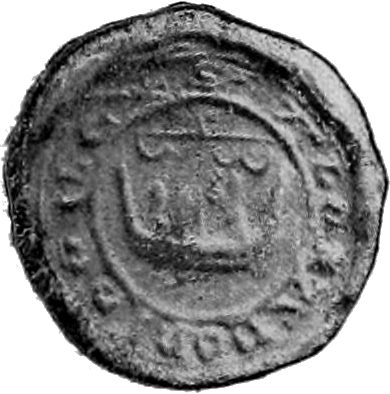
The seal of Aonghus Óg's elder brother, Alasdair Óg, chief of Clann Domhnaill.

This Clann Somhairle infighting appears to have stemmed from Alasdair Óg's marriage to an apparent member of Clann Dubhghaill, and seems to have concerned this woman's territorial claims. Although the opposing chiefs swore to postpone their disagreement in 1292, and uphold the peace in the "isles and outlying territories", the struggle continued throughout the 1290s.

Clann Dubhghaill authority along the western seaboard was seriously threatened by about 1296, when Alasdair Óg was acting as Edward I's royal representative in the region. Certainly, Alasdair Óg appealed to the English king regarding Alasdair Mac Dubhghaill's ravaging of Clann Domhnaill territories in 1297, and may well be identical to the like-named Clann Domhnaill dynast who was recorded slain against Alasdair Mac Dubhghaill two years later. If this identification is indeed correct, this could have been the point when Aonghus Óg succeeded Alasdair Óg as chief.

== Shift of allegiance to the Bruce cause ==
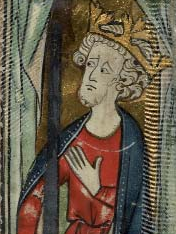
A thirteenth-century illumination of Edward I on folio 6v of British Library Cotton Vitellius A XIII.

In February 1306, Robert the Bruce, a claimant to the Scottish throne, killed his chief rival to the kingship, John Comyn of Badenoch. Although Bruce was crowned King of Scots by March, the English Crown immediately struck back, defeating his forces in June. By September, Robert was a fugitive, and escaped into the Hebrides. There is no certain record of Aonghus Óg between 1301 and 1306. According to the highly reliable fourteenth-century poem The Brus, Aonghus Óg played an instrumental part in Robert's survival and was ever loyal to the Bruce. Specifically, this source relates that, after Robert was defeated at Methven and Dalrigh in the summer of 1306, the king fled into the mountains and made for the coast of Kintyre, where he was protected by Aonghus Óg himself at Dunaverty Castle. Although the Bruce maintains that Aonghus Óg harboured the king at Dunaverty Castle, contemporary evidence reveals that Robert I's men were already in possession of the fortress by March, having acquired it from a certain Malcolm le fitz l'Engleys. In fact, in the immediate aftermath of John Comyn's death, Robert secured control of several western fortresses (including that of Dunaverty), seemingly in an effort to keep a lane open for military assistance from Ireland or the Hebrides. (Note: This procurement of west coast castles could be evidence that he had also arranged for maritime support from kindreds like Clann Domhnaill and Clann Ruaidhrí. The entire episode of Aonghus Óg aiding Robert at Dunaverty, as alleged by The Brus, is absent from the account of the king's flight given by the fourteenth-century Gesta Annalia II.)

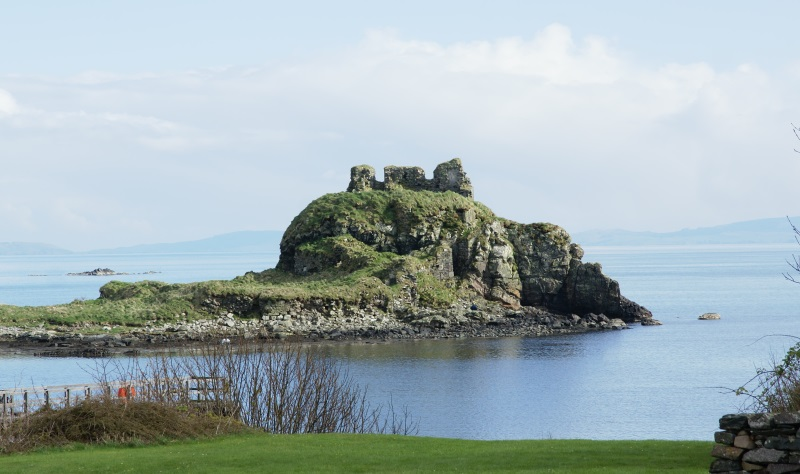
Now-ruinous Dunyvaig Castle. It is conceivable that Robert I found refuge at this Clann Domhnaill fortress in 1306. Whether he was harboured at the hands of Aonghus Óg himself or some other rival chieftain is uncertain.

Penman's speculation is at odds with sources that speak of the Turnberry Band in 1286 that bound the Macdonalds to the Bruces and the long-standing friendship of Angus Og and Robert Bruce, as a result of which Angus Og fought with Robert Bruce in many of his battles from 1306 to Bannockburn.

According to the Bruce, Robert I stayed at the castle for three days before fleeing to Rathlin Island. There is reason to suspect that this account instead masks an historical incident in which the king fled from Kintyre to a Clann Domhnaill castle on Islay—perhaps Dunyvaig Castle—the next northernmost island. (Note: The Bruce declares that, when Robert I landed on Rathlin, the inhabitants fled to a "rycht stalwart castell". Whether such a castle existed on Rathlin is questionable, and the claim that the islanders promised to render daily provisions for three hundred of the king's supporters could be evidence that the text refers to a larger island in the Hebrides. Furthermore, the lord of Rathlin at about the time of the supposed landing was Hugh. The fact that this man was then in the midst of serving the English Crown's maritime forces in the region suggests that he was unlikely to have assented to the Scottish king's use of the island.) If the account of Rathlin given by the Bruce actually refers to Islay, it is still uncertain if Aonghus Óg played any part in the king's salvation. In any case, contemporary sources reveal that Dunaverty Castle succumbed to an English-backed siege in September. Quite where Robert I fled after leaving Kinytre is uncertain. He could have spent time in the Hebrides, Ulster, or Orkney. Certainly, the fourteenth-century Gesta Annalia II states that the king was assisted by Cairistíona Nic Ruaidhrí—an heiress with Hebridean connections—and it is possible that the king indeed set sail for a Clann Ruaidhrí or Clann Domhnaill island. Moreover, Edward I himself thought that Robert I was hidden somewhere amongst the islands on the western seaboard. (Note: There is reason to suspect that Robert I had been fostered by a family in either Ireland or the west coast of Scotland. Candidates include Clann Domhnaill and Clann Ruaidhrí. According to the fourteenth-century Guisborough Chronicle, the king was supported by Scots and Irishmen in Kintyre, and was able to draw rents from Carrick in November 1306.)

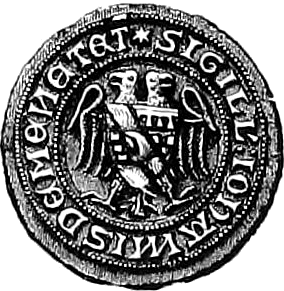
The seal of John Menteith, one of several leading Scottish noblemen who were tasked to sweep the western seaboard with their galley fleets in search of the fugitive Robert I.

The catalyst behind Clann Domhnaill's shift of allegiance from Edward I to Robert I likely lies in local Hebridean politics as well as Scottish patriotism and loyalty to Robert Bruce. Whilst Edward I's destruction of the Balliol regime in 1296 resulted in Clann Dubhghaill finding itself out of favour with the English regime, Clann Domhnaill seems to have sided with the English Crown in an effort to earn royal support in its localised power struggle with Clann Dubhghaill. To the leading clans on the western seaboard, internecine rivalries appear to have been more of a concern than the greater war over the Scottish Crown. Aonghus Óg's documented service to the English Crown in the years after Alasdair Óg's apparent death was almost certainly undertaken in the context of pursuing his kindred's struggle against Clann Dubhghaill. Pressure from Clann Domhnaill and other supporters of the English Crown evidently compelled Clann Dubhghaill into coming onside with the English in the first years of the fourteenth century. (Note: At some point, by 1304, Robert Bruce VII married a daughter of Richard de Burgh, Earl of Ulster. One possibility is that Edward I allowed or arranged for this union with the hope that the two families would counter the threat posed by Clann Dubhghaill and Clann Ruaidhrí.) Whilst Robert I's subsequent murder of John Comyn undoubtedly galvanised Clann Dubhghaill's new-found alignment with Edward I, it also precipitated Clann Domhnaill's realignment of support from the English Crown to the Bruce cause. (Note: John Comyn may well have been a first cousin of Eóin Mac Dubhghaill.) Although Edward I ordered Hugh and John Menteith to sweep the western seaboard with their fleets in 1307, the evanescent Scottish monarch remained at large, seemingly harboured by Clann Domhnaill and Clann Ruaidhrí.

== Rewarded service to the Scottish Crown, and a contested chiefship ==
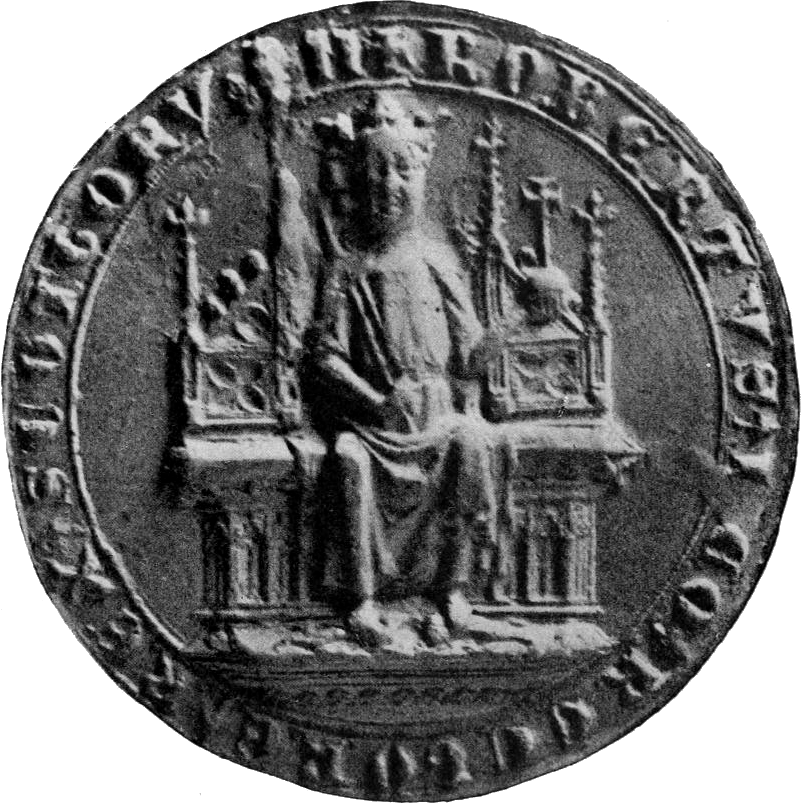
The seal of Robert I. After seizing the throne for himself, this embattled king appears to have partly owed his survival to efforts of Clann Domhnaill and Clann Ruaidhrí.

In 1307, at about the time of Edward I's death in July, Robert I mounted a remarkable return to power, first striking into Carrick in about February. By 1309, Robert I's opponents had been largely overcome, and he held his first parliament as king. Clann Domhnaill clearly benefited from their support of the Bruce cause. Although no royal charters associated with the kindred exist from this period, there are seventeenth-century charter indices that note several undated royal grants. For instance, Aonghus Óg was granted the former Comyn lordship of Lochaber and the adjacent regions of Ardnamurchan, Morvern, Duror, and Glencoe; whilst a certain Alasdair of the Isles received the former Clann Dubhghaill islands of Mull and Tiree. (Note: The date of these grants is unknown.)

Although the indices fail to note any Clann Domhnaill grants concerning Islay and Kintyre it is not inconceivable that the kindred received grants of these territories as well. Later in the fourteenth century, Aonghus Óg's son, Eóin Mac Domhnaill, was granted the territories of Ardnamurchan, Colonsay, Gigha, Glencoe, Jura, Kintyre, Knapdale, Lewis, Lochaber, Morvern, Mull, and Skye. It is possible that the basis for many of these grants laid in the clan's military support of the Bruce cause, and stemmed from concessions gained from the embattled king in about 1306. If this was indeed the case, the fact that Robert I later granted a significant portion of these territories (Lochaber, Kintyre, Skye, and lands in Argyll) to other magnates suggests that his conceivable concessions to Clann Domhnaill may have been undertaken with some reluctance.

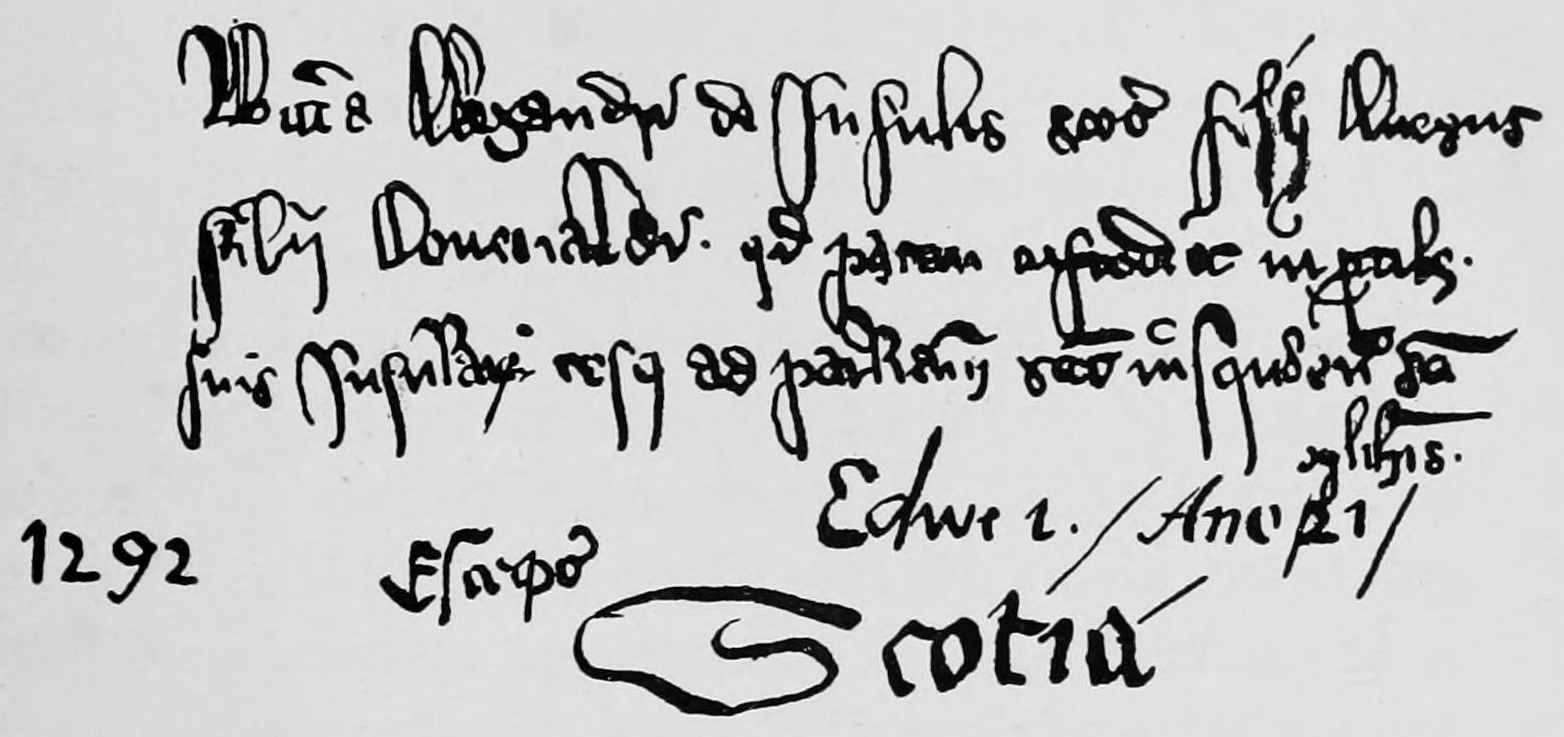
Image a

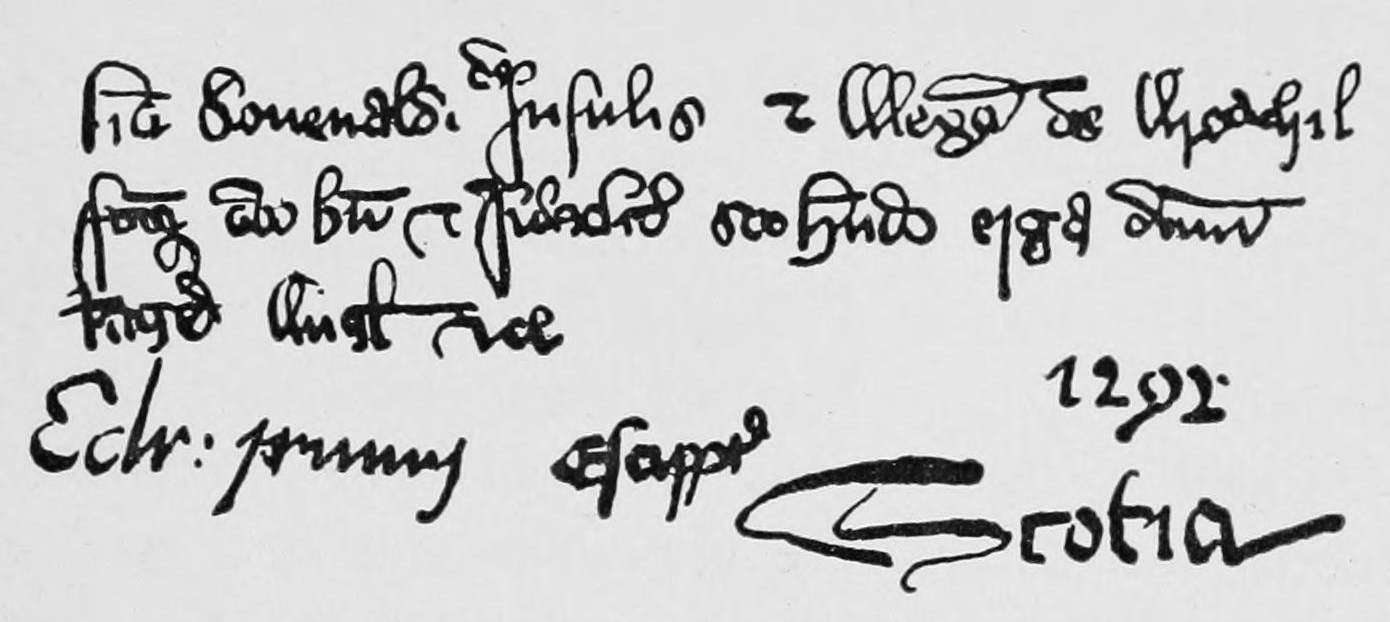
Image b

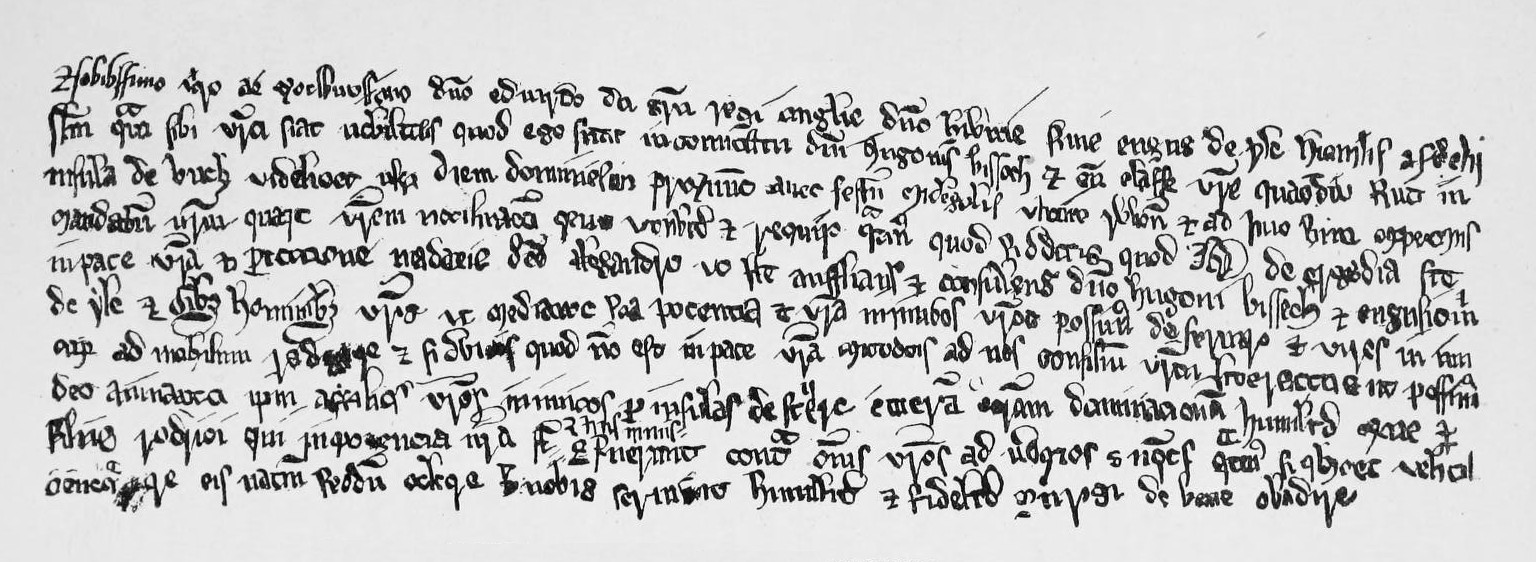
Image c

Facsimiles of correspondence between Clann Domhnaill and the English Crown: a letter from Aonghus Mór and Alasdair Óg (image a), one to which was attached the seal of Alasdair Óg (image b), and one from Aonghus Óg (image c).

There is reason to suspect that the Clann Domhnaill chiefship was contested during this period. For example, the royal grants to Aonghus Óg and Alasdair of the Isles—a man whose identity is uncertain — could be evidence that these two were competitors. Another apparent claimant to the chiefship, a certain Domhnall of Islay — whose identity is likewise uncertain—was present at the parliament of 1309. (Note: This man is attested by numerous contemporary records. Several of these reveal that Eóin Mac Dubhghaill was commissioned to bring him—and an apparent brother of Domhnall named Gofraidh—into the peace of the English king.) Furthermore, the Bruce states that when Robert I fled to Dunaverty Castle in 1306 he was fearful of treason during his stay. (Note: Although the less than non-partisan Sleat History declares that Aonghus Óg was "always a follower of King Robert Bruce in all his wars", there is reason to suspect that this statement may betray a degree of insecurity on the historian's part.) One possibility is that this statement preserves a record of the king's vulnerability to competing regional factions. Although the Bruce specifies that the Clann Domhnaill dynast to whom the king owed his salvation was Aonghus Óg, there is reason to question this claim. If Robert I indeed found protection at a Clann Domhnaill fortress—like Dunyvaig Castle—the attestations of Domhnall of Islay could indicate that it was he who assisted the king.

The Bruce was certainly influenced by later political realities, and was composed during the reign of Robert II, King of Scotland (reigned 1371–1390), the father-in-law of Eóin Mac Domhnaill. The fact that this son of Aonghus Óg ruled as chief when the poem was composed could account for the remarkably favourable light in which Aonghus Óg is portrayed. If the account of Rathlin Island given by the Bruce actually refers to Islay and Dunyvaig Castle, the description of the island's reluctant inhabitants being forced to assist the king could indicate that he did not trust the Clann Domhnaill lord.

Furthermore, the claim that Aonghus Óg was Lord of Kintyre during this period could stem from the fact that, by the time the Bruce was composed, Eóin Mac Domhnaill was married to a daughter of the Robert II, and had gained this contested lordship by way of her tocher. (Note: Earlier, during the tenure of Alasdair Óg, Clann Domhnaill appears to have vied for control of swathes of Kintyre with Malcolm. This man appears to be identical to the Lord of Kintyre who was slain in 1307 campaigning with two of Robert I's brothers in Galloway.)

Seemingly in 1310, whilst in the service of the English Crown, Aonghus Óg inquired of Edward II, King of England as to whether Alasdair Mac Dubhghaill was within the king's peace, and entreated the king on behalf of several unnamed members of Clann Ruaidhrí—men were then aiding Aonghus Óg's English-aligned forces—to grant these Clann Ruaidhrí clansmen feu of their ancestral lands. An indication of the military might at Clann Dubhghaill's disposal may be Aonghus Óg's expressed opinion that, if he were able to join forces with Alasdair Mac Dubhghaill, Edward II would have nothing to fear from his enemies. The fact that Aonghus Óg styled himself "of Islay" in his letter could be evidence that he was indeed acting as chief at this point. Another letter—this one from Hugh to Edward II — reveals that Hugh, Eóin Mac Suibhne, and Aonghus Óg himself, were engaged in maritime operations on behalf of the English Crown, and were enquiring of the king about the status of Alasdair Mac Dubhghaill. (Note: Although these letters of Aonghus Óg and Hugh are sometimes assumed to date to 1301, another letter associated with them concerns the continued English service of Hugh and Eóin Mac Suibhne. The fact that this piece of correspondence identifies John Menteith as an opponent of the English Crown suggests that all three may instead date to 1310. According to this letter, Eóin Mac Suibhne was unable to regain his promised territories of Knapdale primarily because of the forces of Eóin Mac Dubhghaill. Ostensibly, Eóin Mac Suibhne, Eóin Mac Dubhghaill, and John Menteith, were all supporters of the English Crown during this period. However, the latter was present at Robert I's parliament of 1309, and it is possible that this Clann Dubhghaill occupation of Knapdale prompted John Menteith to switch his allegiance to the Bruce cause.)

== Participation in the Battle of Bannockburn ==
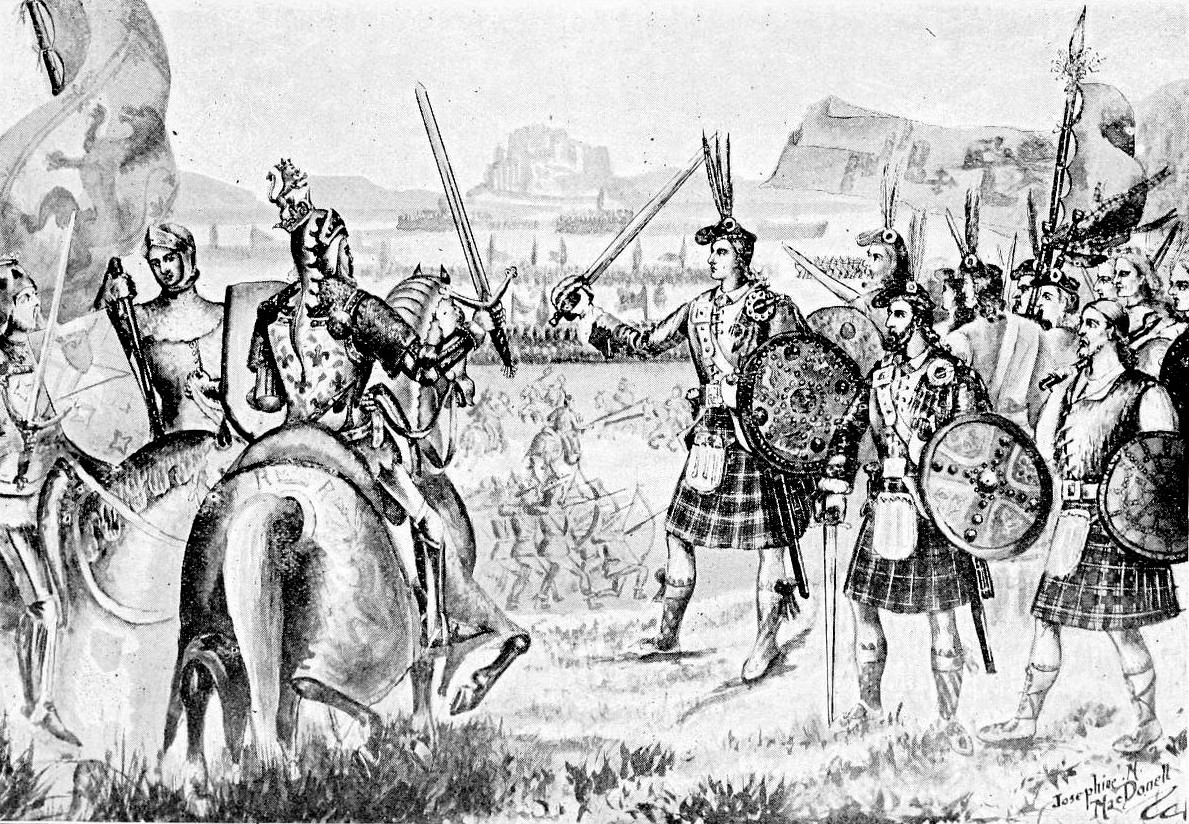
An imaginative nineteenth-century depiction of Aonghus Óg at the Battle of Bannockburn.

In the summer of 1313, Robert I's brother, Sir Edward Bruce, made an agreement with Sir Philip Mowbray, the English commander at Stirling Castle, that gave the English one year to relieve the English garrison or they would surrender the castle. In consequence of this agreement, Edward II announced a massive invasion of Scotland. On 23–24 June, the English and Scottish royal armies clashed near Stirling at what became known as the Battle of Bannockburn. Although there are numerous accounts of the battle, one of the most important sources is the Bruce, which specifies that the Scottish army was divided into several battalions. According to this source, the king's battalion was composed of men from Carrick, Argyll, Kintyre, the Hebrides (all of Angus Og Macdonald's Islesmen), and the Scottish Lowlands. (Note: The composition of the other Scottish battalions is unrecorded and uncertain. Although the Bruce states that there were four Scottish battalions, other sources—such as the fourteenth-century Vita Edwardi Secundi, the fourteenth-century Lanercost Chronicle, and the fourteenth-century Scalacronica—state that there were only three.) Although the size of the opposing armies is uncertain, the Scottish force was undoubtedly smaller than that of English, and may well have numbered somewhere between five thousand and ten thousand. The battle resulted in one of the worst military defeats suffered by the English. Amongst the Hebridean contingent, the Bruce notes Aonghus Óg himself, who commanded the Islesmen and men of Argyll. According to this source, the king's battalion played a significant part in the conflict: for although it had hung back during the onset of hostilities, the battalion engaged the English at critical point in the fray. In any event, just as with the episode at Dunaverty, John Barbour's association of Aonghus Óg with Bannockburn could well be influenced by later political realities. However, John Barbour's account is recognised as highly accurate, and there is no evidence giving a reason to question the point and much to suggest Angus Og's support meant much, as witnessed by the many isles and lands a grateful King Robert bestowed on Angus Og.

== Clann Domhnaill's part in the Bruce campaign in Ireland ==
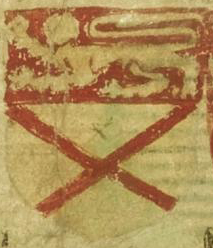
The arms of the Earl of Carrick depicted in Balliol Roll.

Aonghus Óg—or at least a close relative—may have played a part in the Scottish Crown's later campaigning against the Anglo-Irish in Ireland. In 1315, Robert I's younger brother, Edward Bruce, Earl of Carrick, launched an invasion of Ireland and claimed the high-kingship of Ireland. For three years, the Scots and their Irish allies campaigned on the island against the Anglo-Irish and their allies. (Note: Edward Bruce's forces made landfall in Ireland late in May 1315. Charter evidence suggests that Robert I was at Tarbert earlier that month, conceivably collecting a fleet for his brother's invasion. According to the Bruce, at about this time the king had his fleet dragged across the Tarbert peninsula. The poem further claims that the Islesmen were dejected after this, on account of an old prophecy foretelling that whoever could sail their ships across the peninsula would hold dominion in the Isles that no other would be able to withstand. It is probable that, whilst in the region, Robert I collected submissions from competing members of Clann Domhnaill. The king's visit may have also been intended to counter advances made by Clann Dubhghaill. According to the Bruce, whilst Robert I was in the region, a certain John of Lorn resisted the king before his was imprisoned and died in captivity. Although this individual is unlikely to represent Eóin Mac Dubhghaill, it is possible that he is identical to Eóin Mac Neacail, a man who was evidently contemplating siding with Edward II at about this time.) Although every other pitched-battle between the Scots and the Anglo-Irish resulted in a Scottish victory, the utter catastrophe at the Battle of Faughart cost Edward his life and brought an end to the Bruce regime in Ireland.

According to the sixteenth-century Annals of Loch Cé, a certain "Mac Ruaidhri ri Innsi Gall" and a "Mac Domnaill, ri Oirir Gaidheal" were slain in the onslaught. This source is mirrored by several other Irish annals including the fifteenth - to sixteenth-century Annals of Connacht, the seventeenth-century Annals of the Four Masters, the fifteenth- to sixteenth-century Annals of Ulster, and the seventeenth-century Annals of Clonmacnoise. (Note: The Annals of Clonmacnoise exists only in an early modern translation and gives: "mcRory king of the islands and mcDonnell prince of the Irish of Scotland". The eleventh- to fourteenth-century Annals of Inisfallen also notes the fall of Edward Bruce and a certain "Alexander M", a man who could be identical to the Clann Domhnaill dynast referred to by the aforesaid sources.) The precise identities of these men are unknown for certain, although they could well have been the heads of Clann Ruaidhrí and Clann Domhnaill. Whilst the slain member of Clann Ruaidhrí seems to have been Ruaidhrí, the identity of the Clann Domhnaill dynast is much less certain. He could have been Alasdair Óg (if this man was not the one who had been killed in 1299), or perhaps a son of Alasdair Óg. Another possibility is that he was Aonghus Óg himself, or perhaps a son of his. An after-effect of the continued support of Clann Domhnaill and Clann Ruaidhrí to the Bruce cause was the destruction of their regional rivals like Clann Dubhghaill. In fact, the albeit exaggerated title "King of Argyll" accorded to the slain Clann Domhnaill dynast in many of these annal-entries exemplifies the catastrophic effect that the rise of the Bruce regime had on its opponents like Clann Dubhghaill. By the mid-part of the century, Clann Domhnaill, under the leadership of Aonghus Óg's succeeding son, was undoubtedly the most powerful branch of Clann Somhairle.

== Death and descendants ==
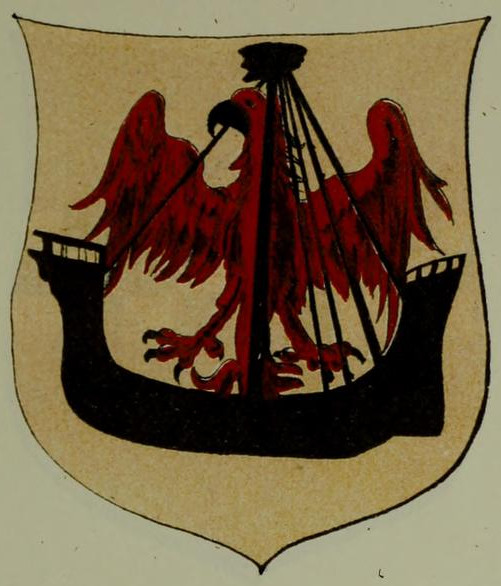
Facsimile of the arms of "The lord of ye Ilis" in the sixteenth-century Sir David Lindsay's Armorial. A son of Aonghus Óg was the first member of Clann Domhnaill to bear the title Lord of the Isles.

Aonghus Óg died at some point after the Battle of Bannockburn—notwithstanding the Hebridean tradition preserved by the eighteenth-century Book of Clanranald and the Sleat History that dates his death to about 1300. Henry Lee, in his "History of the Clan Donald" states that Angus Og died at his castle in Finlaggan on Islay in 1330 and was buried at Iona. One possibility is that he died between 1314 and 1318. This could well have been the case if the slain Clann Domhnaill chieftain at Faughart was indeed his son and successor. After 1330, the Clann Domhnaill lordship seems to have taken up by his son, Eóin Mac Domhnaill.

The political situation in the Hebrides is murky between this man's accession and the disaster at Faughart, and it is possible that an after-effect of this defeat was a period of Clann Ruaidhrí dominance in the region. In 1325, a certain "Roderici de Ylay", Ruaidhrí of Islay, suffered the forfeiture of his possessions by Robert I. Although this record could refer to a member of Clann Ruaidhrí—perhaps Raghnall Mac Ruaidhrí—another possibility is that the individual actually refers to a member of Clann Domhnaill—perhaps a son of either Alasdair Óg or Aonghus Óg.

If Ruaidhrí of Islay was indeed a member of Clann Domhnaill, and a son of Alasdair Óg, his expulsion may have marked the downfall of Alasdair Óg's descendants—Clann Alasdair—and may account for the fact that this branch of Clann Domhnaill failed to hold power in Hebrides after this date. As such, Ruaidhrí of Islay's expulsion could well mark the date upon which Clann Alasdair relocated overseas. The eclipse of Alasdair Óg's line—the senior branch of Clann Domhnaill—may explain the rise of Aonghus Óg's line. If Ruaidhrí of Islay indeed represented the line of Alasdair Óg, his forfeiture evidently paved the way for the rise of Eóin Mac Domhnaill. In fact, before the end of Robert I's reign, this son of Aonghus Óg appears to have administered Islay on behalf of the Scottish Crown, and eventually came to be the first Clann Domhnaill dynast to bear the title dominus insularum ("Lord of the Isles").

If Aonghus Óg was still alive in 1325, he would have witnessed Robert I's apparent show of force into Argyll within the same year. Although Aonghus Óg's tenure as chief is remarkable in regard to his close support of the Bruce cause, the later career of Eóin Mac Domhnaill saw a conspicuous cooling of relations with the Bruce regime—a distancing which may well have contributed to the latter's adoption of the title "Lord of the Isles". (Note: The adoption of the title further evidences the kindred's new-found dominance over the other branches of Clann Somhairle.)

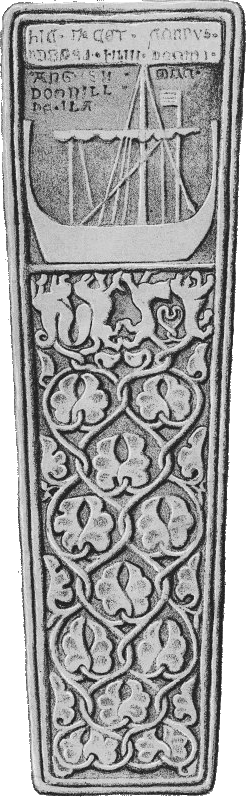
A grave-slab sometimes thought to be that of Aonghus Óg, but may be that of a later like-named man. (Note: The stone appears to have been engraved: "HIC [IA]CET CO[R]PVS / [EN]G[VS]II [FI]LII DOMINI / ENGVSII MAC / DOMNILL / DE YLE". This has been translated to: "Here lies the body of Angusius, son of Lord Angusius MacDonald of Islay". One possibility is that the stone commemorates Aonghus Mac Domhnaill, a son of the fifteenth-century claimant to the lordship of the Isles, Aonghus Óg Mac Domhnaill.)

Aonghus Óg married Áine Ní Chatháin, an Irish woman from Ulster. According to the Sleat History, Áine Ní Chatháin's tocher consisted of one hundred and forty men from each surname that dwelt in the territory of her father, Cú Maighe na nGall Ó Catháin. The Book of Clanranald numbers the men at eighty. The Uí Catháin of Ciannachta were a major branch of the Uí Néill kindred, and the léine chneas or "train of followers" that is said to have accompanied Áine Ní Chatháin is the most remarkable retinue to have arrived through a marriage from Ireland in Scottish tradition. In any case, this tocher appears similar to an historical one dating almost a century earlier, when a Clann Ruaidhrí bride brought over one hundred and sixty warriors to her Irish husband. The tradition of the Clann Domhnaill–Uí Catháin union is corroborated by the record of an English safe-conduct instrument granted to Áine Ní Chatháin, identified as the mother of Eóin Mac Domhnaill in 1338. At a later date, Áine Ní Chatháin appears to have remarried a member of Clann Aodha Buidhe, a branch of the Ó Néill kindred. (Note: Although Áine Ní Chatháin is not named by the Book of Clanranald, and accorded the name "Margaret" by the Sleat History, she is named "Any" by another early modern account of the marriage. One of the Scottish families that may have originated from the retinue was the Mac Beathadh medical kindred. In fact, the earliest member of this family on record was a physician of Robert I, which may have bearing upon the king's close association with Clann Domhnaill. Another family said to have owed its origin in Scotland to the retinue, according to the Sleat History, is the Rothaigh kindred (the Munros). The eighteenth-century Munro Tree also associates the early Rothaigh with Clann Domhnaill, stating: "Robert Munro of Fowlis assisted his Sovereign King Malcolm in his wars against his unnatural subjects he married and left a son Donald and a daughter Anna married to Angus McDonald of Yla and Dying A D 1164".)

Aonghus Óg and Áine Ní Chatháin were the parents of Eóin Mac Domhnaill. Another child of the couple may be the Áine Nic Domhnaill noted in the Clann Lachlainn pedigree preserved by the fifteenth-century manuscript National Library of Scotland Advocates' 72.1.1 (MS 1467). This source reveals that this woman was the wife of Lachlann Óg Mac Lachlainn, and mother of his son, Eóin Mac Lachlainn. Whatever the case, a certain daughter of Aonghus Óg was Máire, a woman who married William III, Earl of Ross. Aonghus Óg appears to have also had another son named Eóin, a man from whom descended the Glencoe branch of Clann Domhnaill.

Although the parentage of Alasdair of the Isles is uncertain, one possibility is that he was another son of Aonghus Óg. Domhnall of Islay could have also been his son.

According to the seventeenth-century Macintosh History, an ancestor of Clann Mhic an Tóisigh named Fearchar married a daughter of Aonghus Óg named "Moram". As Fearchar died in 1274, it suggests this source has confused Aonghus Óg and Aonghus Mór. According to the Sleat History, an illegitimate daughter of Aonghus Mór was the mother of an early chiefly ancestor of Clann Mhic an Tóisigh. The father of this ancestor is stated to have fled to Aonghus Mór whilst on the run for committing manslaughter. Having fathered a son with Aonghus Mór's daughter, the man is stated to have campaigned with Edward Bruce in Ireland where he was slain. The Sleat History also claims that the slain man's son—the ancestor of later Clann Mhic an Tóisigh chiefs—was brought up in Clann Domhnaill territory and endowed by the kindred with lands in Lochaber and Moray. Alexander Mackintosh Shaw also confirms the father of Moran to be Aonghus Mór; "Ferquhard's intercourse with the fair Mora of Isla was at first of an unauthorised character, and that, this being discovered, the lover fled to avoid the wrath of the powerful father. He took refuge in Ireland, but before he had been there long he was recalled, and on his return made Mora his wife."

== Ancestry ==
Ancestors of Aonghus Óg of Islay

16. Somhairle mac Giolla Brighde (died 1164)
8. Raghnall mac Somhairle (died 1191/1192 – c. 1210/1227)
17. Ragnhildr Óláfsdóttir
4. Domhnall mac Raghnaill
2. Aonghus Mór mac Domhnaill (died c. 1293)
1. Aonghus Óg Mac Domhnaill (died 1314 × 1318/c. 1330)
12. Giolla Easbuig Caimbéal (fl. 1266) (Note: Giolla Easbuig is the first member of the Caimbéalaigh to appear in contemporary sources.)
6. Cailéan Mór Caimbéal (died c. 1296)
26. Cailéan mac Donnchaidh
13. Oighrig inghean Cailéin (Note: Such a relationship could mean that the mother of Cailéan Mór was a first cousin of the mother of Robert Bruce VII, Mairghréad, daughter of Niall, Earl of Carrick. Another possibility is that Cailéan Mór's mother was one of the four known daughters of Niall. If correct, this relationship would mean that Cailéan Mór was a first cousin of Robert Bruce VII. In any case, the shared kingship could well explain the consistent support that the Caimbéalaigh gave to the Bruce cause.)
3. unknown

== In media ==
Aonghus Óg appears as a character in the 2018 historical drama film Outlaw King, where he is portrayed by Scottish actor Tony Curran.

He is the central figure in the novel Bound by Honor by Regan Walker, https://www.reganwalkerauthor.com/bound-by-honor.html
