= Clan MacDonald of Glencoe =

Highland Scottish clan

- Clann Iain Abrach
- Motto: Nec Tempore Nec Fato (Neither Time Nor Fate)

Profile
- Region: Scottish Highlands
- District: Lochaber
- Plant badge: Common Heath
- Pipe music: Mort Ghlinne Comhann

Chief
- Alan Donald MacDonald of Glencoe, Chief of the Name and Arms of MacDonald of Glencoe
Allied clans
Clan Stewart of Appin
Rival clans
Clan Campbell

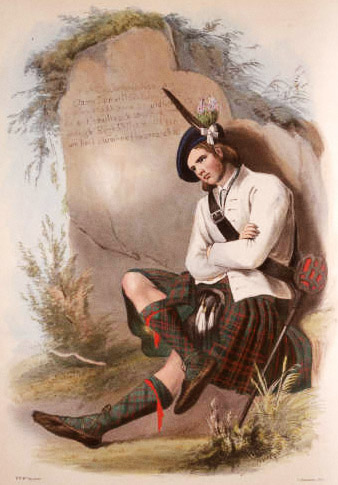
A romanticised Victorian-era illustration of a MacDonald of Glencoe clansman by R. R. McIan from The Clans of the Scottish Highlands published in 1845.

The MacDonalds of Glencoe, also known as Clann Iain Abrach (Scottish Gaelic: Clann Iain Abrach), is a Highland Scottish clan and a branch of the larger Clan Donald. Named after Glen Coe, the MacDonalds (or MacIains as they were more specifically known) lived there from the early 14th century, until the glen was largely abandoned during the Highland Clearances of the late 18th century.

The MacDonalds of Glencoe were constantly involved in trouble with the law and for their consistent raiding, pillaging and cattle rustling. Combined with their participation in the Jacobite rising of 1689, this resulted in the clan being targeted in the 1692 Massacre of Glencoe. They later took part in the risings of 1715 and 1745.

The last clan chief died in 1889, without producing an heir. In the 21st century, the clan has since had a chief recognized by the Lord Lyon King of Arms in January 2024: Alan MacDonald has been confirmed as Chief of the name and arms of MacDonald of Glencoe.

== History ==
=== Origins of the clan ===
The MacDonalds of Glencoe are one of the branch clans of Clan Donald—one of the largest Scottish clans. The eponymous ancestor of Clan Donald is Donald, son of Reginald, son of Somerled. Somerled, son of Gillebride was a 12th-century Norse–Gaelic leader and warrior who fancied himself as "King of the Isles" and "King of Argyll". Through marital alliance and ambitious military conquest, Somerled rose in prominence to create the Kingdom of Mann and the Isles. Traditional genealogies suggest Somerled is a descendant of various Irish legendary figures.

The MacDonalds of Glencoe are descended from Iain Fraoch MacDonald (d. 1368) who was a son of Aonghus Óg of Islay, chief of Clan Donald, who fought alongside Robert the Bruce during the First War of Scottish Independence, including the successful Battle of Bannockburn in 1314.

It is believed that Angus Og never married the daughter of MacEanruig or MacHenry the 'head man' in Glencoe. Instead, he married Aine O'Cahan of Ulster who gave birth to his legitimate heir, John of Islay, who became Lord of the Isles. Angus Og gained the lands of Glencoe from Robert the Bruce who, after the Battle of Bannockburn, bestowed these lands on him as well as others. In turn, Angus Og gave his natural son, Iain Fraoch, 1st of Glencoe. Iain Fraoch settled in the wild and foreboding Vale of Glencoe, in the district of Lorne, Scotland.

According to author Henry Lee in his description of the landscape of Glencoe, "The Vale, by eagle-haunted cliffs o'erhung. Where Fingal fought and Ossian's harp was strung".

=== 16th century ===
The territories of Glencoe was an ever hostile environment whose sparse soil drove Highlanders to theft, raid, and steal cattle from neighboring clans, as it was a common practice in the Scottish Highlands, although the Maclans of Glencoe disavowed any connection with these piratical expeditions of their kinsmen.

Throughout the 15th century, Clan Campbell, a relatively small clan at one time, began to rise in power at the expense of their older rivals the MacDonalds. After the Lordship of the Isles was fortified in 1493, the power of the MacDonalds began to fail and the clan became disunited. The Campbells, however, seized opportunities to become a dominant force in Argyllshire by gaining royal favors, understudying law practices, and strategic marriages through various clans. Some of the agricultural lands they would gain would be from former MacDonald territories.

=== 17th century ===
The struggle between the MacDonalds and the Campbells came to a height in the 17th century, when the Campbells began to gain political ascendancy over Clan Donald. During the Wars of the Three Kingdoms, the Covenanter armies in Scotland were directed by Archibald Campbell, 1st Marquess of Argyll, who attacked the last strongholds of the MacDonalds and MacDougalls. This resulted in the burning the forts of the latter at Gylen and Dunnollie near Oban, while three hundred MacDonalds were allegedly killed after surrendering following the Battle of Dunaverty in 1647.

After these events, the MacDonalds of Glencoe followed westward into the lands of their Campbell enemies during the mid-half of the 17th century. For geographical reasons, the lands which suffered most from these incursions were those of the younger branch of the Argyll family, the Campbells of Glenorchy, whose head in the days of Charles II, became Earl of Breadalbane and Holland. According to tradition, on one occasion, a marriage feast was going to happen at Glenurchy’s stronghold of Finlarig on Loch Tay. The word was suddenly brought that the MacDonalds were driving the cattle of the Campbells out of the glen, and the wedding guests almost instantly found themselves engaged in a bloody affray with the invaders. After their victory fighting under King James’s general, Viscount Dundee, at the Battle of Killiecrankie, the MacDonalds of Glencoe seized the opportunity to sweep Glenlyon of all of its cattle and valuables, leaving Robert Campbell of Glenlyon, Breadalbane’s personal henchman, destitute.

==== The Massacre of Glencoe ====
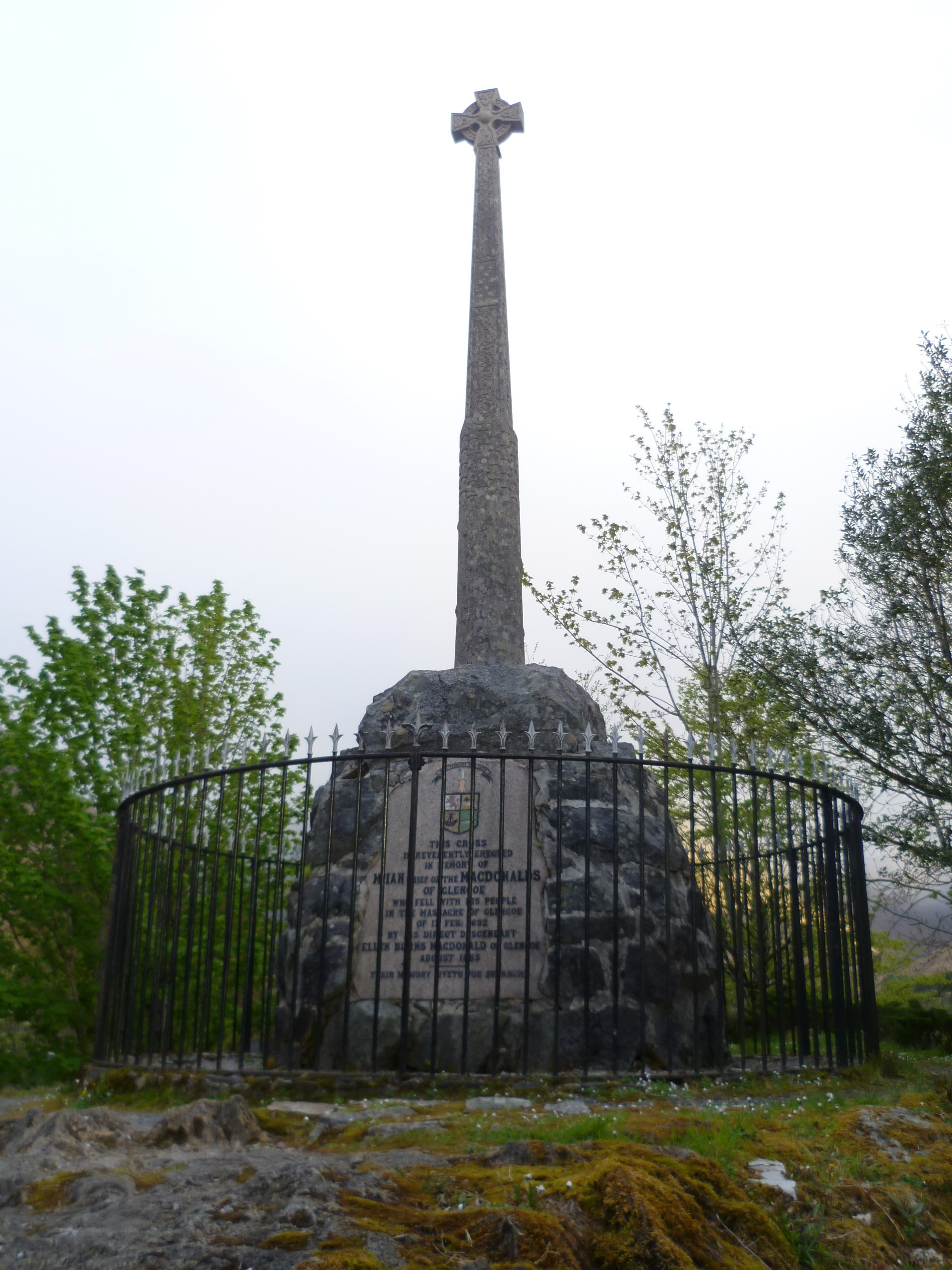
Memorial at Glencoe

The Glencoe MacDonalds were one of three Lochaber clans with a reputation for lawlessness, the others being the MacGregors and the Keppoch MacDonalds. Levies from these clans served in the Independent Companies used to suppress the Conventicles in 1678–80, and took part in the devastating Atholl raid that followed Argyll's Rising in 1685. This made them an obvious target when the Duke of Argyll returned to power after the 1688 Glorious Revolution in Scotland.

During the 1689- 1692 Jacobite rising, the Scottish government held a series of meetings with the Jacobite chiefs. In March 1690, the Secretary of State, Lord Stair, offered a total of £12,000 for swearing allegiance to William III. They agreed to do so in the June 1691 Declaration of Achallader, the Earl of Breadalbane signing for the government.

On 26 August, a Royal Proclamation offered a pardon to anyone taking the Oath prior to 1 January 1692, with severe reprisals for those who did not. Two days later, secret articles appeared, canceling the agreement in the event of a Jacobite invasion and signed by all the attendees, including Breadalbane, who claimed they had been manufactured by MacDonald of Glengarry. Stair's letters increasingly focused on enforcement, reflecting his belief that forged or not, none of the signatories intended to keep their word, and so an example was required.

In early October, the chiefs asked the exiled James II for permission to take the Oath unless he could mount an invasion before the deadline, a condition they knew to be impossible. His approval was sent on 12 December and received by Glengarry on the 23rd, who did not share it until the 28th. One suggestion it was driven by an internal power struggle between Protestant elements of the MacDonald clan, like Glencoe, and the Catholic minority, led by Glengarry. Delayed by heavy snow, the Glencoe chief was late taking the oath, but Glengarry himself did not swear until early February.

The exact reason for the selection of the Glencoe MacDonalds remains unclear but led to the Massacre of Glencoe (Gaelic: Mort Ghlinne Comhann) in the early hours of the 13th of February 1692. This was carried out by troops quartered on the Macdonalds, commanded by Robert Campbell of Glenlyon; the number of deaths is disputed, the often quoted figure of 38 being based on hearsay evidence, while the MacDonalds claimed 'the number they knew to be slaine were about 25.' Recent estimates put total deaths resulting from the Massacre as 'around 30', while claims others died of exposure have not been substantiated.

Although the action itself was widely condemned, there was limited sympathy for the MacDonalds; the government commander in Scotland, Thomas Livingstone, commented in a letter: "It's not that anyone thinks the thieving tribe did not deserve to be destroyed, but that it should have been done by those quartered amongst them makes a great noise."

=== 18th century ===
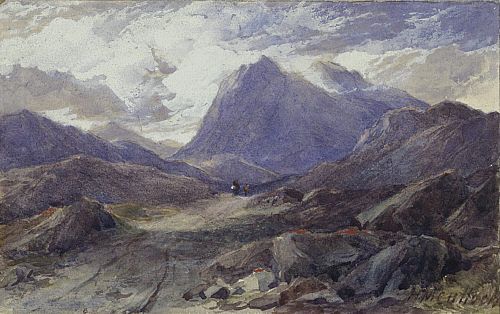
Glencoe, by Horatio McCulloch, 1864; abandoned in the 1750s, by then it was a remote and empty landscape

After the Glencoe massacre, the MacDonalds of Glencoe rebuilt their houses, and the clan experienced significant turmoil and upheaval from the British government for the next several generations, eventually taking part in the Jacobite uprisings of 1715 and 1745 supporting the House of Stuart in their bid for the British throne. The MacDonalds of Glencoe fought at Battle of Sheriffmuir during the Jacobite rising of 1715. The MacDonalds of Glencoe would later join Charles Edward Stuart in the Jacobite rising of 1745 in an effort to regain the British throne for the House of Stuart. The chief, Alexander MacIain MacDonald, 14th of Glencoe, joined the cause with 130 men, and fought through all his various campaigns until the final defeat of the Stuart cause at Battle of Culloden.

After the Jacobite Rising of 1745, the clan experienced further agitation and upheaval. The Glencoe MacDonalds, along with other Highland clans, suffered harsh reprisals from the British government. Many members of the clan were forced to flee their homes or face imprisonment, and the traditional way of life in the Highlands was diminished.

=== 19th century ===
The Glencoe clan gradually declined in power and influence. There were no significant records to suggest any further information in regards to the lasting history of the MacDonalds of Glencoe. The last of the original Glencoe chiefs, Alexander James MacDonald, 19th of Glencoe, died in 1889. Afterwards, the Glencoe branch of Clan Donald had no successor to succeed as chief, leading the clan to become an armigerous clan, with no chief recognized by the Lord Lyon King of Arms.

=== Present ===
In 2018, a team of archaeologists organised by the National Trust for Scotland began surveying several areas related to the massacre, with plans to produce detailed studies of their findings. Work in the summer of 2019 focused on the settlement of Achtriachtan, at the extreme end of the glen; home to an estimated 50 people, excavations show it was rebuilt after 1692. It was still occupied in the mid-18th century, but by 1800 the area was deserted.

== Clan Tartan ==
The clan's tartan is sold as MacIain/MacDonald of Glencoe but sometimes is often sold as MacDonald of Ardnamurchan through confusion of both clans being known as MacIains. There is a separate tartan known as the MacDonald of Glencoe, it is very different from the MacIan or the Ardnamuchan. This is the proper tartan for Glencoe and was found on the bodies exhumed in the 1800s for burial in consecrated ground. This is an ancient tartan and predates the Highland Clearances.

== List of clan chiefs ==
The following is a list of the historic chiefs of the Clan MacDonald of Glencoe:

- Iain Og an Fraoch MacDonald, 1st of Glencoe (Abt 1300 – 1358), (son of Aonghus Óg of Islay)
- John MacIain MacDonald, 2nd of Glencoe (Bef 1358)
- John MacIain MacDonald, 3rd of Glencoe
- John MacIain MacDonald, 4th of Glencoe
- John MacIain MacDonald, 5th of Glencoe
- John MacIain MacDonald, 6th of Glencoe
- John MacIain MacDonald, 7th of Glencoe
- Iain Og MacIain MacDonald, 8th of Glencoe (1543 – Abt 1590)
- Iain Og MacIain MacDonald, 9th of Glencoe (1579–1610)
- Iain Abrach MacDonald, 10th of Glencoe ( – 1630)
- Alasdair Ruadh MacIain MacDonald, 11th of Glencoe ( – 1650)
- Alasdair Ruadh MacIain MacDonald, 12th of Glencoe (1630–1692) (Killed at the Massacre of Glencoe)
- John MacIain MacDonald, 13th of Glencoe (1657–1714)
- Alexander MacIain MacDonald, 14th of Glencoe (1708–1750)
- John MacIain MacDonald, 15th of Glencoe (Abt 1735 – 1785)
- Alexander MacIain MacDonald, 16th of Glencoe (1761–1814)
- Dr. Ewen MacIain MacDonald, 17th of Glencoe, H.E.I.C.S. (1788–1840)
- Ronald MacIain MacDonald, 18th of Glencoe (1800–1841) (brother of 17th)
- Alexander James MacDonald, 19th of Glencoe (1829–1889)

== Disputed chiefship ==
Multiple contenders exist for the MacDonald of Glencoe Chiefship. In January 2024, Lord Lyon King of Arms announced that it had received a petition from a New Zealand citizen to be recognized as the clan chief.

== Septs of the Clan ==
The list of septs of the Clan MacDonald of Glencoe is:

Culp, Dawson, Henderson, Hendrie, Hendry, Henry, Johnson, Kean, Keene, Keane, MacDonald, MacGilp, MacHendrie, MacHendry, MacHenry, MacIan, MacIsaac, MacKean, McKean, McKendrick, McKern, MacKern, MacKillop, MacPhilip, Moor, Philip, Philp

== See also ==
- Eilean Munde

== Sources ==
- Campsie, Alison (12 February 2018). "The Scotsman". Archaeologists trace lost settlements of Glencoe destroyed after 1692 massacre.
- Cobbett, William (1814). Cobbett's Complete Collection Of State Trials And Proceedings For High Treason And Other Crimes And Misdemeanors. Nabu Press. ISBN 1175882445.
- Gordon, John (1845). Papers Illustrative of the Political Condition of the Highlands of Scotland, 1689–1706 (2015 ed.). Sagwan Press. ISBN 978-1340252717.
- Harris, Tim (2007). Revolution: The Great Crisis of the British Monarchy 1685-1720. Penguin. ISBN 978-0141016528.
- Levine, Mark, ed. (1999). The Massacre in History (War and Genocide). Bergahn Books. ISBN 1571819355.
- MacDonald, Kenneth (11 May 2019). "The dig uncovering Glencoe's dark secrets". BBC.
- Prebble, John (2002) [1968]. Darien: the Scottish Dream of Empire. Pimlico. ISBN 978-0712668538.
- Szechi, Daniel (1994). The Jacobites: Britain and Europe, 1688–1788. Manchester University Press. ISBN 0719037743.
- Treviño, Julissa (26 March 2018). "Archaeologists Trace 'Lost Settlements' of 1692 Glencoe Massacre". smithsonianmag.com. Smithsonian Institution.
