= Henderson County =

Henderson County is the name of several counties in the United States:

- Henderson County, Illinois
- Henderson County, Kentucky
- Henderson County, North Carolina
- Henderson County, Tennessee
- Henderson County, Texas
