= Hendersonville High School =

Hendersonville High School may refer to:

- Hendersonville High School (North Carolina)
- Hendersonville High School (Tennessee)
