= Hendersonville, Virginia =

Unincorporated community in Virginia, United States

- Unincorporated community
- Location within Virginia Location within the United States
- Coordinates: 37°8′45″N 78°5′15″W
- Country: United States
- State: Virginia
- County: Nottoway
- Elevation: 449 ft (137 m)
- Time zone: UTC-5 (Eastern (EST))
  - Summer (DST): UTC-4 (EDT)
- GNIS feature ID: 1493920

Hendersonville was an unincorporated community in Nottoway County, Virginia, United States.
