= Henderson China =

Chinese real estate developer

Henderson China Holdings
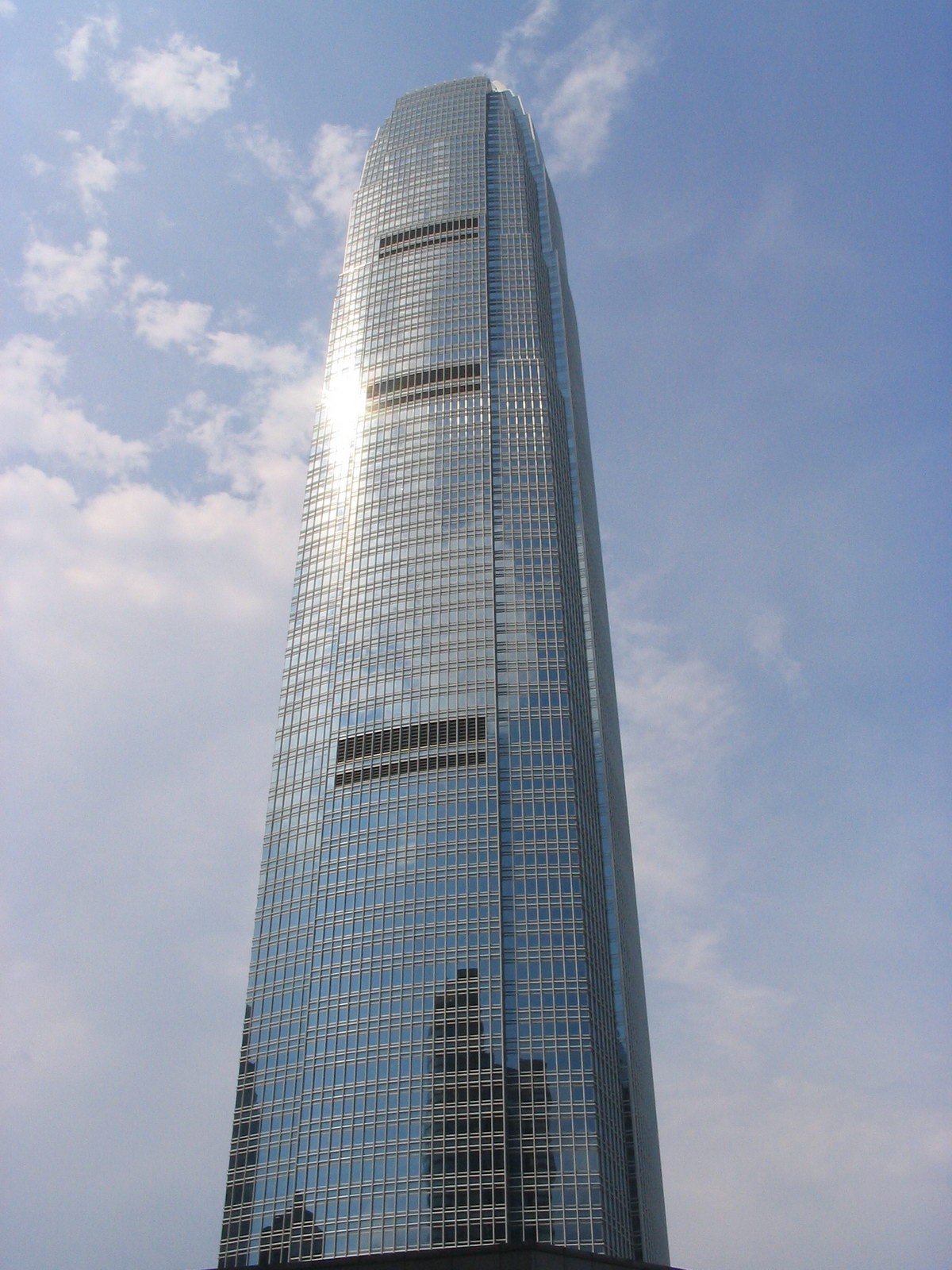
- Type: Private Limited
- Industry: Shopping mall, Financial center, Department store
- Founded: 1976
- Founder: Lee Shau Kee
- Headquarters: Hong Kong 75/F, Two IFC Centre, 8 Finance Street, Central Hong Kong
- Key people: Chairman: Peter Lee Ka-kit
- Number of employees: Hong Kong 50-100
- Parent: Henderson Land Development Co., Ltd.
- Website: HLD Mainland China

Henderson China Holdings is a large real estate developer in China and has had Lee Shau Kee as its chairman and managing director since 1976.

== Listing ==
- Henderson Centre, Beijing
- Shanghai Plaza

== See also ==
- Real estate in China
