= Bukit Merah Secondary School =

- 达善中学; Sekolah Menengah Bukit Merah

Location
- 10 Lengkok Bahru, Singapore 159050; Bukit Merah; Singapore; 1.2859°N 103.8131°E

Information
- Type: Government; Co-educational
- Motto: Sedia "Always be Prepared"
- Established: 4 January 1968; 58 years ago
- Session: Single
- Principal: Chong Wai Ki (Darren)
- Colour: Navy Blue Red White

Bukit Merah Secondary School (BMSS) is a co-educational government secondary school in Bukit Merah, Singapore. BMSS has established itself as a Value-Added school since 1992, offering the Express, Normal Academic and Normal Technical streams leading to a Singapore-Cambridge GCE Ordinary Level or Singapore-Cambridge GCE Normal Level certificate.

== History ==
BMSS was the 101st school built by the government. It was completed and handed over to the Ministry of Education on 28 December 1967. The school received its first batch of students on 4 January 1968 and was officially declared open by Lim Guan Hoo, the Member of Parliament for Bukit Merah, on 16 May 1968.

In 2001, Saint Thomas Secondary School merged with BMSS and the old school building was demolished to make way for a new campus with better facilities that would cater to the growing school population.

In 2004, Delta Secondary School merged with BMSS. In the same year, the new school building at Lengkok Bahru was officially declared open by Chay Wai Chuen, Member of Parliament for Tanjong Pagar Group Representation Constituency. The following year, a new vision and mission statement was crafted for the school to better reflect its identity following the mergers.

In 2017, Henderson Secondary School merged into BMSS. The merged school retained BMSS's English name, while adopting as its Chinese name that of Henderson Secondary School (达善中学; pinyin: Dáshàn Zhōngxué).
