= Iain Fraoch MacDonald =

Iain Fraoch MacDonald (died 1368) also known as John og of the Heather was a younger son of both Angus Og MacDonald of Islay and a daughter of Dugal MacEanruig, additionally he was also the founder of Clan MacDonald of Glencoe.

"Fraoch" is a nickname which means "the snarling" in the Scottish Gaelic language, although it usually means heather
