= Justice Henderson =

Justice Henderson may refer to:

- Frank Henderson (South Dakota politician) (1928–2012), associate justice of the South Dakota Supreme Court
- Henry P. Henderson (1843–1909), associate justice of the Utah Territorial Supreme Court
- Leonard Henderson (1772–1833), chief justice of the North Carolina Supreme Court
- William L. Henderson (1894–1984), chief judge of the Maryland Court of Appeals
- William Henderson (Canadian politician) (1916–2006), justice of the Supreme Court of Ontario

== See also ==
- Judge Henderson (disambiguation)
