= Henderson Township =

Henderson Township may refer to:

== Arkansas ==
- Henderson Township, Hot Spring County, Arkansas, in Hot Spring County, Arkansas
- Henderson Township, Union County, Arkansas, in Union County, Arkansas

== Illinois ==
- Henderson Township, Knox County, Illinois

== Michigan ==
- Henderson Township, Michigan

== Minnesota ==
- Henderson Township, Sibley County, Minnesota

== North Carolina ==
- Henderson Township, Vance County, North Carolina, in Vance County, North Carolina

== North Dakota ==
- Henderson Township, Cavalier County, North Dakota, in Cavalier County, North Dakota

== Pennsylvania ==
- Henderson Township, Huntingdon County, Pennsylvania
- Henderson Township, Jefferson County, Pennsylvania
