= Gilbert de Insula =

Gilbert de Insula (Anglicised: Gilbert of the Isles) was a son of Domhnall mac Alasdair, who received a charter for unspecified lands in the Stirlingshire region, in the year 1330. He also received a charter for half the lands of Glorat in the parish of Campsie. Today, Gilbert de Insula is considered to be a grandson of Alasdair Mór. He is also considered to possibly be the ancestor of the Alexanders of Menstrie.
