= Battle of Loup Hill =

Battle during the Jacobite rising of 1689

- Part of Jacobite risings
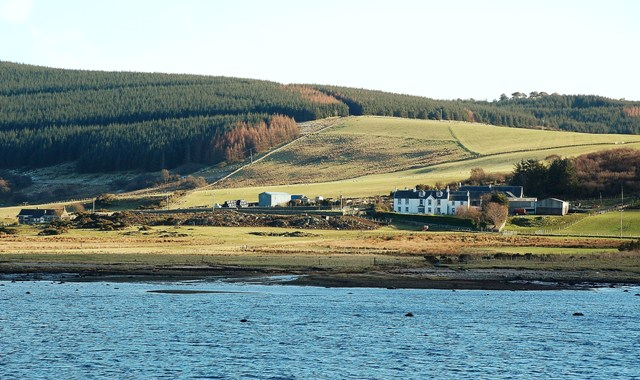
- Loup House
Date	16 May 1689
Location	Kintyre, Argyll, Scotland
Result	Williamite victory

Belligerents
(Kingdom of Scotland) Williamites	Jacobites

Commanders and leaders
(Kingdom of Scotland) William Young	Gorrie McAlister; MacNeill of Gallachoille

Strength
500	200

Casualties and losses
None	2 killed

The Battle of Loup Hill took place near Loup Hill (Scottish Gaelic: Cruach na Luib) in Kintyre on 16 May 1689, during the Jacobite rising of 1689, a connected conflict of the Williamite War in Ireland.

In early May, Jacobite sympathisers took control of northern Kintyre, and when government troops arrived to retake the peninsula, they ran into an ambush on the slopes of Loup Hill. Despite the advantage of height and surprise, the Jacobites fought ineffectively and quickly retreated; a few days later, they abandoned Kintyre.

Losses on both sides were minimal and the battle itself was little more than a minor skirmish. However, the loss of Kintyre was a serious strategic setback for the Scottish rising, since it prevented them being easily re-supplied by their allies in Ulster.

== Background ==
In February 1685, the Catholic James II & VII came to power with widespread support; the 1638 to 1651 Wars of the Three Kingdoms meant many in both England and Scotland feared the consequences of bypassing the 'natural heir'. A desire for stability led to the rapid collapse of the Monmouth Rebellion and Argyll's Rising in June 1685, both led by Protestant dissidents.

By 1680, over 95% of Scots belonged to the Church of Scotland, or kirk; Catholics numbered less than 2% of the population and even other Protestant sects were barred. The 1681 Scottish Test Act required holders of public office to be members of the kirk; James' attempts to repeal it undermined his own supporters, while rewarding the extreme Presbyterians who backed Argyll in 1685.

In June 1688, two events turned dissent into a crisis, the first being the birth of James Francis Edward on 10 June. This created the prospect of a Catholic dynasty, rather than James being succeeded by his Protestant daughter Mary, and her husband William of Orange. The second was the prosecution of the Seven Bishops, which seemed to extend official policy beyond mere tolerance for Catholicism to an assault on the established church. Their acquittal on 30 June destroyed James' political authority in both Scotland and England.

In 1685, many feared a return to civil war if James were bypassed; by 1688, anti-Catholic riots made it seem only his removal could prevent one. William landed in Brixham on 5 November with 14,000 men; as he advanced, James' army deserted, and on 23 December, he went into exile in France. In February 1689, the Parliament of England offered the English throne to William and Mary.

On 14 March, a Convention met in Edinburgh to agree a settlement for Scotland. It was dominated by supporters of the new administration, with 'Jacobites' restricted to those linked to James by religion or personal ties. However, the number of activists on either side was tiny, the vast majority being unenthusiastic about either option. On 12 March, James landed in Ireland, and the Convention offered the Scottish throne to William and Mary on 11 April. The next day Dundee raised the Royal Standard on Dundee Law, officially beginning the rebellion.

== Battle ==
Kintyre 1689; key locations (note proximity of Ulster to the south)

Close links between Scottish MacDonalds and Antrim MacDonnells, as well as between Presbyterians in Ulster and Argyllshire meant conflicts in one country often spilt into the other. By April, most of Ireland was held by Jacobites; in Ulster, only Derry was still held by a Protestant garrison. Kintyre was strategically important since it allowed Dundee to be resupplied from Ireland using small boats, which was essential as all major Scottish ports were held by the new government.

In choosing sides, local rivalries were as important as allegiance to the Stuarts or religion. Kintyre was previously dominated by the MacDonalds and MacAlisters, before becoming subordinate to the expansionist Campbells in the 1670s. After Argyll's Rising in 1685, the original owners regained their independence, but with the advent of the new government and return of Argyll to favour, they faced losing it once again.

Government-backed Campbell militia took possession of Tarbert Castle in April, shortly before a French merchant ship commandeered by Irish refugees arrived in Skipness, raising fears of an Irish invasion. The dangers of losing control of Kintyre were obvious to the government but they were short of troops; commissions for raising new regiments were only issued in April and many were still forming. A unit of around 500 men under Captain William Young was put together from those available and transferred in small boats to Tarbert where they landed on 15 May.

Confident of Irish support, Gorrie Macalister of Loup, Macalister of Tarbert, Macneill of Gallachoille and Macdonald of Largie declared for James, and occupied Skipness Castle on the eastern side of the peninsula. Since this blocked Young moving south, he advanced across the peninsula to occupy their estates of Loup House and Largie. As he did so, he ran into a force of 200 men under Macneill and Gorrie Macalister, positioned on the slopes of Loup Hill.

Young reported they fired at each other, before the Jacobites fled; his force suffered no casualties and they found only two enemy dead. Unwilling to trust his inexperienced troops with a night attack, he decided not to pursue, and continued on his way to Clachan, where he was joined by local government supporters.

== Aftermath ==
Realising they were outnumbered, the Jacobite chiefs abandoned Kintyre to the government, and escaped to Ireland. Several of them fought at the Battle of Killiecrankie in July, and were subsequently outlawed for treason.

== Sources ==
- Baker, Derek (2009). Schism, Heresy and Religious Protest. Cambridge University Press. ISBN 978-0521101783.
- Coward, Barry (1980). The Stuart Age 1603–1714. Longman. ISBN 0582488338.
- Fritze, Ronald; Robison, William (1996). Historical Dictionary of Stuart England, 1603–1689. Greenwood. ISBN 0313283915.
- Harris, Tim (2007). Revolution; the Great Crisis of the British Monarchy 1685-1720. Penguin. ISBN 978-0141016528.
- Hopkins, Paul (1986). Glencoe and the End of the Highland War. John Donald Publishers Ltd. p. 141. ISBN 978-0859761024.
- Lenman, Bruce (1995). The Jacobite Risings in Britain, 1689–1746. Scottish Cultural Press. ISBN 189821820X.
- Mcalister, Lynn (2015). "Scandled of Treasone". macalisterhistory.com.
- Macpherson, James (1775). Original Papers: Containing the Secret History of Great Britain (2017 ed.). Hansebooks. ISBN 3743435721.
- Miller, John (1978). James II; A study in kingship. Menthuen. ISBN 978-0413652904.
- Mitchell, Dugald. "Tarbert Past and Present (1886) in Tarbert Castle Assessment; page 96" (PDF). Kilmartin. Archived from the original (PDF) on 19 May 2018.
- Robertson, Barry (2014). Royalists at War in Scotland and Ireland, 1638–1650. Routledge. ISBN 978-1409457473.
- Wormsley, David (2015). James II: The Last Catholic King. Allen Lane. ISBN 978-0141977065.
