= Clan MacAlister of Antrim =

Irish clan

Clan MacAlister of Antrim is an Irish clan and a branch of Clan MacAlister of Scotland. The clan was established as an Irish sept in Antrim in north-east Ulster, as gallóglaigh (galloglasses), in the service of the Lord of the Isles and Clan MacDonald of Dunnyveg.

== History ==
Serving as galloglass warriors fighting on behalf of the Lord of the Isles and Clan MacDonald of Dunnyveg, the clansmen were granted lands in Antrim. Kinbane Castle was given to Owen MacEoin Dubh MacAlister by Sorley Boy MacDonnell.
