= Charles Somerville MacAlester =

Scottish clan chief (1797–1891)

- Born: 15 September 1797
- Died: 6 January 1891 (aged 93)

Lieutenant-Colonel Charles Somerville MacAlester of Loup and Kennox (1797–1891) was a son of Charles MacAlester and Janet Somerville. He was born in Scotland in 1797 and was a chief of Clan MacAlister.

== Biography ==
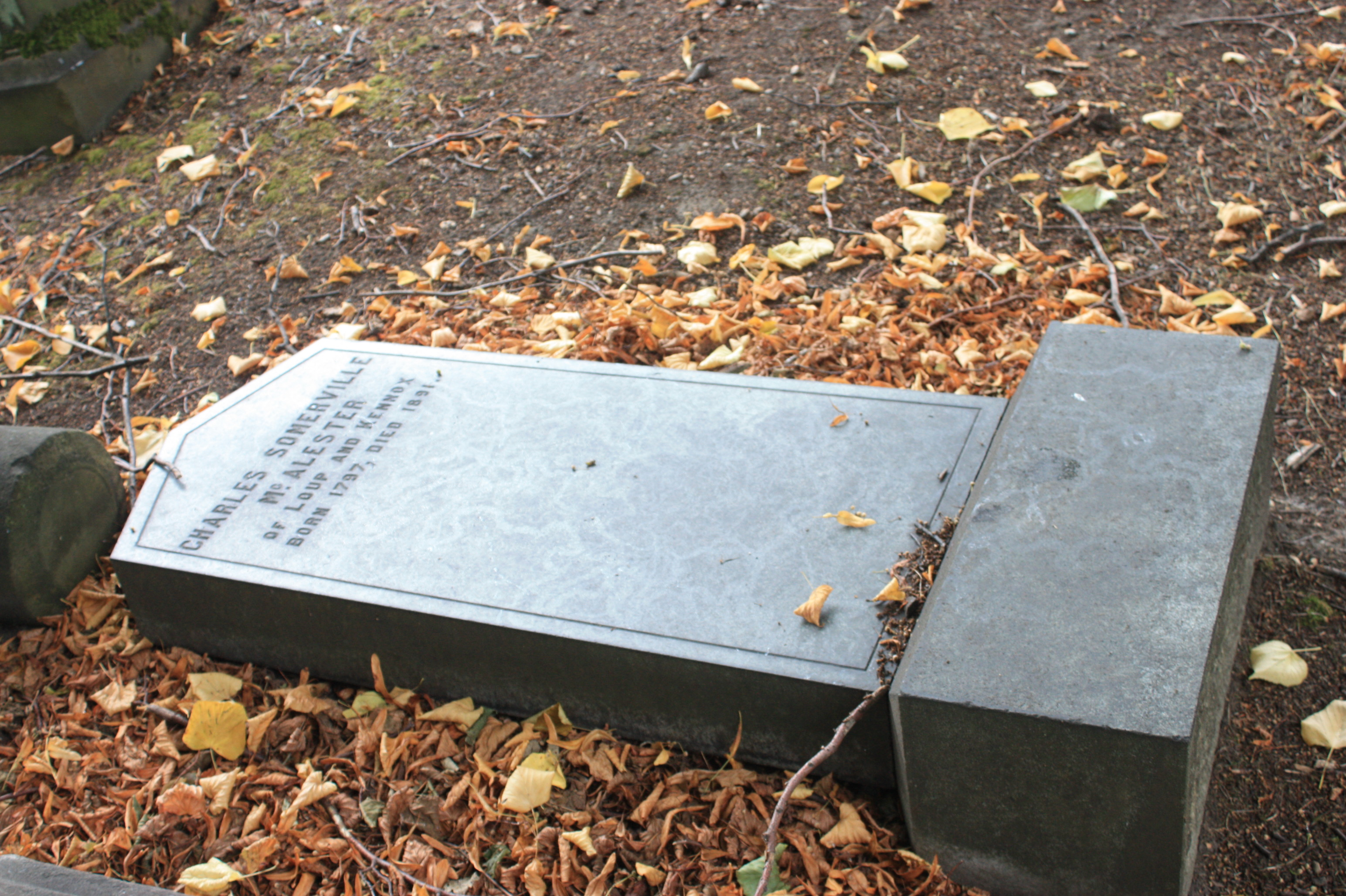
The grave of Charles Somerville McAlester, Warriston Cemetery

Born 15 September 1797, the eldest son of Charles MacAlester and Janet Somerville, daughter of William Somerville of Kennox and Lilian Porterfield, daughter of Gabriel Porterfield of Hapland.

Charles married Mary Adeline Brabazon Lyon, a daughter of Captain Edward Lyon and Anna Catherine Wynstanley, in January 1828. He became Deputy Lieutenant of Ayrshire, a Justice of the Peace of Ayrshire and gained the rank of Lieutenant-Colonel in the service of the Ayr and Wigton Militia.

In 1846 Charles MacAlester of Loup and Kennox, was granted the right to take up Arms as Chief of Clan MacAlister, by the Lyon Court.

He died on 6 January 1891 and is buried in Warriston Cemetery. The plain granite monument lies to the north of the vaults but has been vandalised (2016). He was succeeded as Chief of Clan MacAlister by his son Charles.

== Family ==
Charles and Mary had five children.

- Lieut.-Colonel Charles Somerville MacAlester b. 18 Mar 1830, d. 17 Jan 1903, JP, DL, Royal Ayr and Wigtown Militia.
- Edward MacAlester
- Anna Catharine MacAlester
- Jessy MacAlester
- Mary MacAlester d. 1894

Preceded by Charles Godfrey McAlester	Chief of Clan Macalister; 1847 - 1891	Succeeded by Charles MacAlester
