= Charles Godfrey McAlester =

- Born: 13 January 1765
- Died: 7 October 1847 (aged 82)

Lieutenant Colonel Charles Godfrey McAlester 12th of Loup, Chief of Clan MacAlister (13 January 1765 – 7 October 1847), was the son of Angus MacAlester and Jane MacDonald.

== Early life ==
Born on 13 January 1765, he was the only son of Angus MacAlister of Loup and Jane MacDonald, daughter of John MacDonald of Ardnacroish and Grace MacAlester.

== Ruling ==
He succeeded his father in 1796, and took the name and Arms of Somerville in 1805 along with MacAlister of Loup and became known as Charles Godfrey Somerville McAlester of Loup and Kennox.

Colonel Charles McAlester, Laird of Loup and Kennox, became Deputy Lieutenant of Ayrshire, a Justice of the Peace of Ayrshire, and Commandant of the first regiment of Ayrshire Local Militia. It is recorded that when the regiment was disbanded, he kept the banners, instruments and other items at Kennox, saying that "if anyone had a better claim" he would release the items to them.

== Family life ==
McAlester married Janet Somerville of Kennox, daughter of William Somerville of Kennox and Lilian Porterfield, on 28 March 1792. Charles and Janet had four children: Charles Somerville MacAlester (b. 15 Sep 1797, d. 1891), James McAlester of Chapeltown, Williamina McAlester and Jane McAlester.

== Death ==
He died on 7 October 1847 and was succeeded as Chief of Clan MacAlister by his son Charles.

Preceded by Angus MacAlester	Chief of Clan Macalister; 1796 - 1847	Succeeded by Charles Somerville MacAlester
