= Eachann Mac Goraidh MacAlasdair =

Eachann Mac Goraidh MacAlasdair (English: Hector, son of Goffrey, son of Alexander, anglicised: Hector MacGorrie MacAlester), was the 6th of Loup, Chief of Clan MacAlister. He succeeded to the title in 1636. He was hanged for treason at Whinny Hill, Kinlochkerran, Scotland in 1647.

== Biography ==
Hector MacAlester became Chief of Clan MacAlister in 1636. During the Wars of the Three Kingdoms, he took no part in the wars with the James Graham, 1st Marquess of Montrose and Alasdair Mac Colla Chiotaich MacDomhnaill. However, many of his clan fought in the campaign.

On his way to join the besieged Royalist garrison at Dunaverty Castle in 1647, he was captured by Covenanter Archibald Campbell, 1st Marquess of Argyll and swiftly hanged with his sons at Whinny Hill, Kinlochkerran. Margaret, his wife, arrived shortly after the hanging and yelled curses at Archibald Campbell for his actions.

His grandson Alexander MacAlister, succeeded as Chief of Clan MacAlister.

== Family ==
He married Margaret Campbell, daughter of Colin Campbell, 1st of Kilberry and Helen Wood; they had known issue:

- Godfrey, 7th of Loup, hanged with his father at Whinny Hill, Kinlochkerran in 1647.
- Elizabeth, married Alasdair Mac Colla Chiotaich MacDomhnaill, son of Coll Chiotaich Mac Gillespick MacDomhnaill.
- Barbara, married Archibald Oig Campbell, son of Archibald Campbell, 5th of Inverawe and Christiane Carswell.
- Coll, hanged with his father at Whinny Hill, Kinlochkerran in 1647.

== Citations ==
Preceded by Goraidh Mac Eachann MacAlasdair	Chief of Clan Macalister; 1636–1647	Succeeded by Alexander MacAlister
