= Domhnall of Islay =

Fourteenth-century Scottish nobleman

Domhnall Mac Domhnaill (died 1318?), also known as Domhnall of Islay and Domhnall of the Isles, was a fourteenth-century Scottish nobleman. He appears to have been a member of Clann Domhnaill. First attested in the first decade of the fourteenth century, Domhnall appears to be last recorded in the second decade upon his death. Domhnall's attestations suggest that he was a claimant to the chiefship of Clann Domhnaill, and may have possessed the chiefship.

== Uncertain parentage ==
Domhnall may have been a son of Aonghus Mór mac Domhnaill. As such he may have been a younger brother of Alasdair Óg, and an older brother of Aonghus Óg. Another possibility is that he was a cousin of Aonghus Mór's sons. As such, Domhnall could have been a son of Aonghus Mór's younger brother, Alasdair Mór. Alternately, it is also possible that Domhnall was a son of Alasdair Og or Aonghus Og.

No extant traditional genealogical source specifically accords Aonghus Mór and Alasdair Óg with a son named Domhnall. The fifteenth-century manuscript National Library of Scotland Advocates' 72.1.1 (MS 1467), on the other hand, accords Alasdair Mór a son with this name. Nevertheless, Domhnall appears to have had a brother named Gofraidh, and whilst Alasdair Óg is otherwise recorded to have had a son by this name, Alasdair Mór is not. (Note: Although a Clann Domhnaill pedigree preserved by National Library of Scotland Advocates' 72.1.1 seems to identify a certain Gofraidh as a son of Alasdair Mór, this man's lineage appears to be missing a generation, and seems to refer to Alasdair Óg instead. If so, the epithet that the pedigree accords this Gofraidh's father—"mhoir"—is actually that of Aonghus Mór.)

== Possible attestations ==
=== Edward Bruce's Gallovdian campaign, 1308 ===
Midway through 1308, Edward Bruce overran Galloway. This campaign seems to be reported by the fourteenth-century texts Chronicle of Lanercost, Gesta Annalia II, and the Bruce. The final clash in this Gallovidian campaign may have been fought near Buittle, on the banks of the River Dee, rather than the Cree as claimed by the Bruce. Specifically, Gesta Annalia II relates that a certain 'Domhnall of the Isles' led a host of Gallovidians to the River Dee where they were defeated by Edward Bruce, and the leader was himself captured. (Note: There are numerous manuscript versions of Gesta Annalia II. One identifies him as 'of Mar', another leaves a blank space after his name, indicating that the scribes were unsure as to the man's identity. According to the Bruce, the English forces were led by Aymer St John and Ingram Umfraville. According to the Chronicle of Lanercost, the leaders of the Bruce forces were Edward Bruce, Alexander Lindsay, Robert Boyd, and James Douglas.) Whilst it is possible that the defeated man mentioned by this source might refer to Domhnall himself, another possibility is that the account instead refers to Dubhghall Mac Dubhghaill.

A later account of the battle, preserved by the fifteenth-century Scotichronicon, confusingly identifies 'Domhnall of the Isles' as leader of the Gallovidian forces, but then includes a verse about the clash in which a 'Domhnall of Islay' is identified as an ally of Edward Bruce. As such, there is reason to suspect that the Bruce-aligned 'Domhnall' mentioned by this source is identical to Domhnall himself, and that the Gallovidian-aligned 'Domhnall' is identical to Domhnall Mac Cana, a Gallovidian who consistently supported the English against the Bruces, and who disappears from record at about this point in history.

The account of Edward Bruce's campaigning against the Gallovidians, given by the Chronicle of Lanercost, states that his forces were partly composed of men from the Isles. The evidence of Domhnall in league with pro-Bruce forces could indicate that Gesta Annalia II was erroneous in placing him and the Islesmen against Edward Bruce's forces. One possibility is that the account given by the Chronicle of Lanercost influenced Gesta Annalia II in its identification of Edward Bruce's foe as from the Isles. (Note: Although there may be reason to suspect that the battle actually dates to the well-attested Gallovidian campaigns of 1307 or 1313, because such a clash in 1308 is not corroborated by administrative sources, the fact that the battle is recounted by sources such as the Chronicle of Lanercost, Gesta Annalia II, the Bruce, and Scotichronicon, appears to affirm its historicity. One explanation for the fact that it is not attested by English records is that it was overshadowed by other events of 1308, such as the loss of Inverurie and the herschip of Buchan.)

=== Robert I's first parliament, 1309 ===
Domhnall is recorded to have been present at Robert I, King of Scotland's first parliament at St Andrews, in March 1309. Domhnall's name appears immediately after that of Alasdair Mac Dubhghaill in a list of men who witnessed a letter from the parliament to the King of France. If Domhnall indeed fought against and captured by Edward Bruce in 1308, Domhnall's subsequent attestation at Robert's parliament could indicate that he had submitted to the king after the defeat. (Note: In 1293, a certain 'Domhnall mac Aonghuis' ("Douenald filius Aneg'") is recorded to have been absent from the inaugural parliament of John, King of Scotland. Although it is conceivable that this name refers to Domhnall himself, it is more likely a scribal error in reference to Aonghus Mór ('Aonghus mac Domhnaill'), who is ordered to render his homage by Easter, 1293.)

=== Royal charter witness, 1308×1314 ===
Domhnall witnessed an undated charter of Robert to Melrose Abbey. The charter evidently dates to some point in 1308×1314, perhaps March 1309.

=== Clann Domhnaill factionalism ===
The attestations of Domhnall suggest that he was a contestant to the Clann Domhnaill lordship, and may have possessed the chiefship.

At an uncertain date, perhaps 1306, 1308, or else in 1314 and/or 1315, Eóin Mac Dubhghaill was directed by the English Crown to bring into the king's peace Domhnall, Gofraidh—a man described as Domhnall's brother—and a certain Eóin Mac Neacail. (Note: There is a possibility that the apparent forenames of Domhnall and Gofraidh actually represent garbled and contracted forms of chiefly surnames. If so, one possibility is that the names refer to the chiefs of Clann Domhnaill—perhaps Aonghus Óg—and Clann Ruaidhrí.)

If the records of the English reaching out to Domhnall date to 1315, it would reveal that the Clann Domhnaill leadership was fractured at the onset of the Bruce campaign in Ireland. Not only had Eóin Mac Dubhghaill been assigned to make overtures to leading Hebrideans—like Domhnall and Gofraidh—but he was placed in command of the English naval forces responsible for retaking the Isle of Man. The very same year, according to the Bruce, Robert had his fleet dragged across the Tarbert isthmus between Knapdale and the Kintyre peninsula at about the very time his brother, Edward, initiated his invasion of Ireland. The poem further claims that the Islesmen were dejected as a result of Robert's action, on account of an old prophecy foretelling that whoever could sail their ships across the peninsula would hold dominion in the Isles that no other would be able to withstand. It is probable that, whilst in the region, Robert collected submissions from competing members of Clann Domhnaill. The king's visit may have also been intended to counter advances made by Clann Dubhghaill. (Note: According to the Bruce, whilst Robert was in the region, a certain John of Lorn resisted the king before his was imprisoned and died in captivity. Although this individual is unlikely to represent Eóin Mac Dubhghaill, it is possible that he is identical to Eóin Mac Neacail, a man who was evidently contemplating siding with Edward II at about this time.)

Although no charters from Robert to members of Clann Domhnaill are extant, undated seventeenth-century indices reveal that leading members of the kindred indeed received grants. Even though none are known to have been gifted to Domhnall, it is very likely that he received some. One possibility is that he gained the bulk of the Clann Domhnaill lordship of Islay and in Kintyre. Certainly, Aonghus Óg received a grant for the former Comyn lordship of Lochaber, and the adjacent regions of Ardnamurchan, Morvern, Duror, and Glencoe; whilst a certain Alasdair of the Isles received the islands of Mull and Tiree, formerly possessed by Clann Dubhghaill.

The royal grants to Aonghus Óg and Alasdair of the Isles could be evidence that these two were competitors for the Clann Domhnaill chiefship. The record of Domhnall's presence at Robert's 1309 parliament could likewise indicate that he represented a rival interest in the kindred. Furthermore, the Bruce states that, when Robert fled English-aligned forces to Dunaverty Castle in 1306, Robert was fearful of treason during his stay. One possibility is that this statement preserves a record of the king's vulnerability to competing regional factions. Although the Bruce specifies that the Clann Domhnaill dynast to whom the king owed his salvation was Aonghus Óg, there is reason to question this claim. If Robert indeed found protection at a Clann Domhnaill fortress—like Dunyvaig Castle—the attestations of Domhnall could indicate that it was he who assisted the king.

=== Death in Ireland, 1318 ===
Domhnall appears to be noted by the continuation of the Annales of Nicholas Trevet. If this fourteenth-century English chronicle is to be believed, Domhnall evidently died in 1318, whilst serving in the Bruce campaign in Ireland, conceivably at the Battle of Faughart.
