= Eoin Dubh mac Alasdair =

Scottish clan chief

Eoin Dubh mac Alasdair (Anglicised: John the Black, son of Alexander) was a son of Ranald mac Alasdair, and was a chief of Clan MacAlister.

Eoin Dubh created his seat at Ardpatrick, South Knapdale. He was succeeded upon his death by his son Charles, who had been appointed Steward of Kintyre in 1483.

== Citations ==
Preceded by Ranald mac Alasdair	Chief of Clan Macalister ?? - ??	Succeeded by Charles Mac Eoin Dubh mac Alasdair
