= Alexanders of Menstrie =

Clan Alexander Origins, (1604)

Ancestral arms of Alexander of Menstrie: Per pale argent and sable, a chevron and in base a crescent, all counterchanged. These were first registered in Workman's Manuscript under the name Alschoner, a variant of Alexander. The arms have been adapted by several branches of the family.

The Alexanders of Menstrie, also known as the House of Alexander, are a sept of Clan MacAlister of Scotland. The family is said to descend from Somerled, Lord of the Isles. The seat of the clan was at Menstrie Castle in Menstrie, Clackmannanshire. Descendants of the Alexanders of Menstrie have become prominent in Ireland, England and the United States.

== History of the clan ==
There have been conflicting origins for this clan, which first became prominent when poet and courtier William Alexander, a great favourite of King James VI, was knighted in 1604. He was given a grant to settle the Colony of Nova Scotia in 1621 and created Viscount of Stirling and Lord Alexander of Tullibody in 1630. Upon the coronation of Charles I in 1633, Alexander was further created Earl of Stirling and Viscount of Canada. On the same occasion he was granted significant lands in British North America, including all of the future province of Canada, the entire territory of Nova Scotia and parts of New England, including Long Island. However, his male line apparently failed upon the death of the fourth earl in 1739. Since then, there have been several attempts by people seeking to claim the titles and their lands, through various pedigrees, but none were successfully proven.

=== Origins ===
In a personal memoir, William Alexander, 1st Earl of Stirling (c. 1567–1640), cited a "misty Highland genealogy" in tracing his family origin, in which he claimed descent from Somerled, Lord of the Isles (died 1164), through his descendant John MacDonald, Lord of the Isles (Eoin Carrach MacDomhnaill, 7th Lord of the Isles) of Clan MacDonald. According to Alexander's family history, John married Princess Margaret Stewart, daughter of King Robert II; their son Alexander MacDonald was the father of Angus, who founded the Clan MacAlister of Loup Castle. Another son of Angus, also Alexander MacDonald, was given a grant of lands of Menstrie in Stirlingshire from the Earl of Argyll and settled there, and his descendants assumed the English name Alexander as a surname.

A similar account is found in The Peerage of Scotland: A Genealogical and Historical Account of all the Peers of the Kingdom (1767), although it stated it was Alexander MacDonald, son of Lord of the Isles and Princess Margaret, who was given the grant for Menstrie from the Argyll family and from whom the family first took its name. It has also been stated that the original family name was Alschoner, a modified form of the patronymic Alexanderson, and that the Alschoners migrated from Angus to Stirlingshire in the 14th century.

However, in his authoritative work The Scots Peerage, Sir James Balfour Paul stated that there was no evidence supporting the "general assertion" that the Alexanders of Menstrie took their name from Alexander of Islay, Earl of Ross, son of Donald of Islay, Lord of the Isles. Balfour Paul states that the Alexander surname is found in many places in Scottish history, particularly in eastern Scotland. The Irish Book of Ballymote, which was written in the late 14th and early 15th centuries, gives twelve generations from Colla Uais, who was one of the founders of the kingdom of Airgíalla in Ireland, to Somerled, Lord of the Isles (died 1164), down to John MacDonald, Lord of the Isles (died 1380) and this is followed through to the pedigree of the "Clan Alexander", but this is in reference to the parent house of the Clan MacAlister.

=== 16th century ===
According to Balfour Paul, the first record of an Alexander of Menstrie was Thomas Alexander of Menstrie in 1505/6, who was one of 17 assessors in a dispute between David Arnot, Abbot of Cambuskenneth and Sir David Bruce of Clackmannan related to division of the property at Cambuskenneth Abbey. How Thomas Alexander acquired Menstrie is unknown, Balfour Paul wrote, though it is certain the land belonged to the Earl of Argyle. In 1518, Thomas Alexander was listed as a tenant in Tullibody near Menstrie.

On 7 April 1526, Colin, Earl of Argyll granted a charter for the lands of Menstrie to Andrew Alexander (probably the son of Thomas) and his wife Catherine Graham in liferent, and their son Alexander Alexander in fee. In February 1527, Alexander Alexander surrendered the lands of Menstrie back to the Earl of Argyll. In 1529, Argyll appointed "Alexander Alsynder de Menstrie" bailie of Argyll's lands in Clackmannanshire. Over the next few years he and his heirs were granted additional lands in Menstrie and in Perthshire, and he was also referred to as "Alexander Alschender" and "Alschoner" of Menstrie. He died in the 1550s and was succeeded by his son William Alexander, who died around 1574. William's younger brother James received a charter of the land of Glencarse in the barony of Alloway from the Earl of Mar. After William's death, his son Alexander succeeded him. Alexander Alexander married Marion Graham and was the father of the first Earl of Stirling. Alexander died in 1580 and his children were entrusted into the care of their great uncle James.

=== 17th century ===
Further lands of Tillicoultry were added in the 17th century. In 1631, Archibald MacAllister of Tarbert visited Sir William Alexander at Menstry, and during this visit MacAllister acknowledged the Earl as his chief, however the Macalisters of Loup were the rightful chiefs.

=== Irish branch ===
Rev. Andrew Alexander moved to Ireland in 1618, settling in Ulster (now Northern Ireland). His son Capt. Andrew Alexander was granted lands of Ballyclose, near Newtown Limavady, County Londonderry, in 1666. However, during the Williamite War in Ireland, Andrew Alexander was attainted for being a Williamite by the ousted king James II in his so-called Patriot Parliament, held in 1689 in Dublin. His grandson Nathaniel Alexander, an alderman of the city of Londonderry, married Elizabeth McClintock of Dunmore, County Donegal, and was the father of James Alexander, who made his fortune as a nabob with the East India Company. He bought Caledon House and was created Earl of Caledon in 1801. Nathaniel Alexander's second son, Robert Alexander of Boom Hall (gifted to him by his younger brother), was the father of Bishop Nathaniel Alexander. Robert Alexander's daughter married Whig politician Sir Robert Ferguson, 2nd Baronet.

Lady Jean Alexander, eldest daughter of the first Earl of Stirling, also settled in Ireland, and in 1623 married Hugh Montgomery, 2nd Viscount Montgomery. Their son, the 3rd viscount, was created Earl of Mount Alexander in the Irish Peerage, in honour of his mother's family.

Field Marshal Sir Sir Harold Alexander was the third son of James Alexander, 4th Earl of Caledon. He was created Earl Alexander of Tunis in 1952.
