= Ardpatrick, Argyll =

Coordinates: 55°46′30″N 5°35′2″W

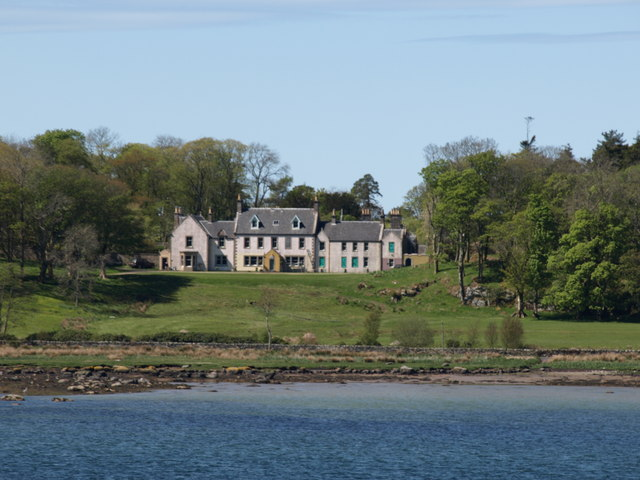
Ardpatrick House, 2010

Ardpatrick (Scottish Gaelic: Àird Phàdraig) is a village at the southwestern extremity of the Knapdale, Argyll, Scotland. The village is built along the north western shore of West Loch Tarbert.

Ardpatrick Point forms a headland at the north of West Loch Tarbert and looks south west to the island of Gigha.

== History ==
A prehistoric standing stone stands in a field near Ardpatrick, known as Achadh chaorann.

The headland of Ardpatrick is according to legend, the landing place of St. Patrick, on his way from Ireland to Iona.

Upon the formation of the Clan MacAlister, becoming independent from Clan MacDonald in 1493, their chief, Iain Dubh (Anglicisation: Black John), created the seat of the clan at Ardpatrick. Ardpatrick House was built in 1769 for Angus MacAlester, 11th of Loup, by John Menelaws and Thomas Menelaws, from Greenock.

== See also ==
- Clan MacAlister
