= Goraidh Mac Eachann MacAlasdair =

Goraidh Mac Eachann MacAlasdair (English: Geoffrey son of Hector, son of Alexander, anglicised Godfrey MacEachan MacAlester, or Gorrie) was born c. 1570-1580s, he became 5th of Loup, Chief of Clan MacAlister in 1587. He died in c. 1636 at Tarbert, Argyll, Scotland.

== Biography ==
Gorrie MacAlester became Chief of Clan MacAlister at a young age in 1587 and was placed under the tutorage of Charles McAlester of Tarbert. During this time, Gorrie would have learned the skills and abilities capable of becoming chief. A dispute arose when Gorrie became romantically linked with a young woman, who Charles wished to link with one of his sons and prevented their union. After Gorrie became aware of the involvement of Charles, Charles fled for his life.

Upon the return of Charles MacAlester in 1598, he was slain by Gorrie. The sons of Charles fled to Askomill House, Kilkerran, Kintyre, the residence of Angus Macdonald, 8th of Dunnyveg. In Gorrie's quest to capture and put to the sword the sons of Charles, he sought the support of Sir James Macdonald, in dispute with his father Angus MacDonald. Askomill House was surrounded by between two or three hundred armed men and upon refusal of the surrender of the Charles's sons, the house was set on fire. James MacDonald who was aware that his father and mother were in the house, refused to let the fire be extinguished and took his father prisoner.

It is unknown whether Gorrie participated in the Battle of Traigh Ghruinneart in 1598 with the members of Clan MacAlister who were sent as reinforcements to help Sir James Macdonald.

Two years later Clan MacAlister attacked the estates of Clan Montgomery on the Isle of Arran, where everything belonging to the Chief John Montgomery of Skelmorlie was seized including £12,000 worth of possessions.

== Family ==
He married a daughter of Allan MacDougall of Raray in 1578 and had the following issue:

- Eachann Mac Goraidh MacAlasdair (Hector), 6th of Loup
- Finovola, married Hector Maclean, 4th Laird of Coll
- Isabel, married Archibald Campbell of Glen Carradale

Preceded by Alasdair Mac Eachann MacAlasdair	Chief of Clan Macalister; 1587 - ??	Succeeded by Eachann Mac Goraidh MacAlasdair
