= Clachan, Kintyre =

Village in Argyll and Bute, Scotland

Coordinates: 55.748°N 5.563°W

Clachan: Scottish Gaelic: An Clachan
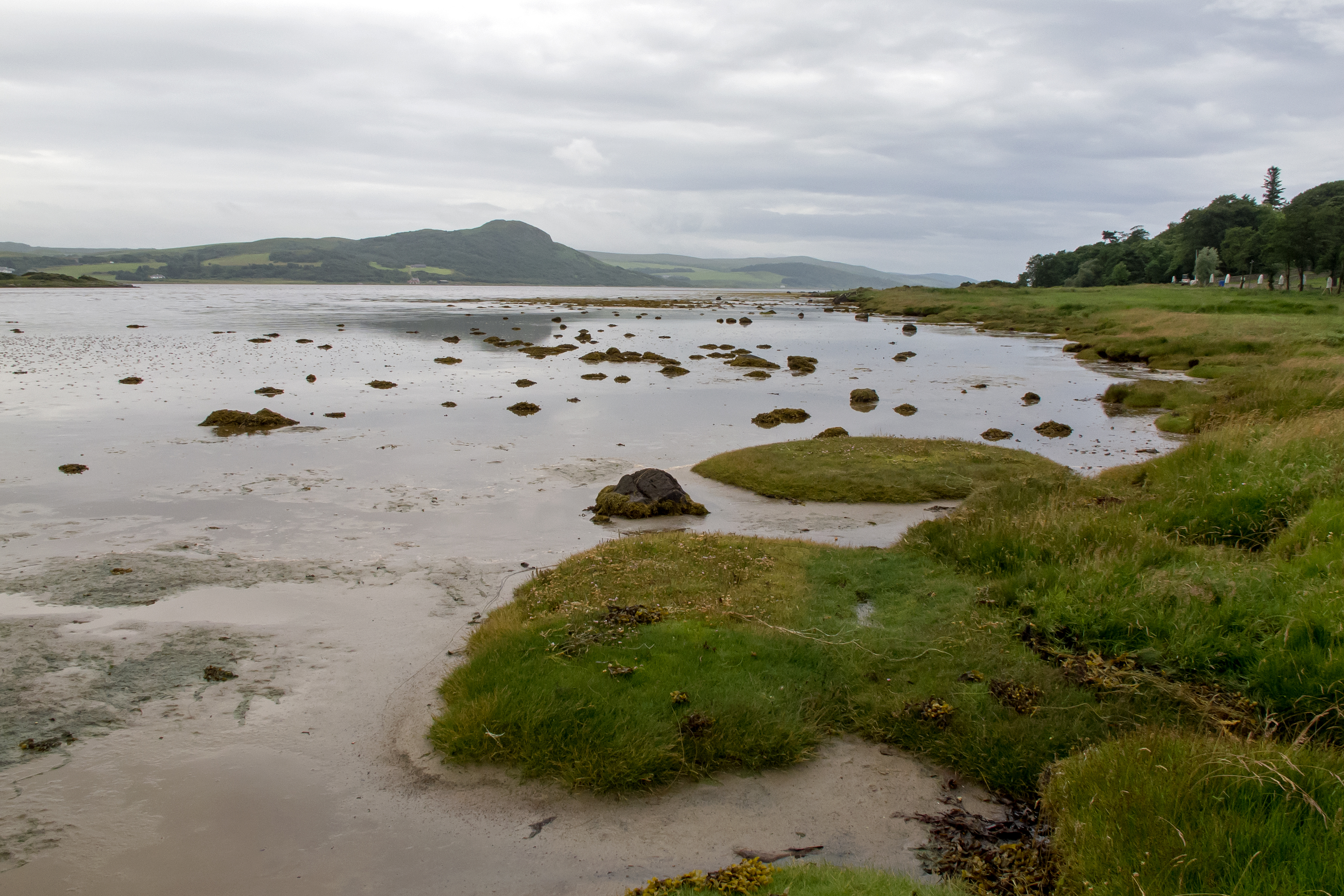
- West Loch Tarbert from Achadh-Chaorann

- Location within Argyll and Bute
- OS grid reference: NR7656
- Council area: Argyll and Bute
- Country: Scotland
- Sovereign state: United Kingdom
- Post town: Tarbert
- Postcode district: PA29 6
- Police: Scotland
- Fire: Scottish
- Ambulance: Scottish
- UK Parliament: Argyll, Bute and South Lochaber
- Scottish Parliament: Argyll and Bute

Clachan is a small village in North Kintyre, Argyll and Bute, Scotland. Clachan is the site of an old church, which was the principal church for the North Kintyre area. The church is surrounded by carved stone statues of the chiefs of the Clan Alasdair. Another group of standing stones (the tallest of which is 3.4 metres), and a burial cist, are found to the south of Clachan, near Ballochroy Farm.

In 1971 it had a population of 108.

The last major battle to be fought in Kintyre took place on the steep slopes of Loup Hill in May 1689. Here, the local forces of MacDonald of Largie, McAlester of Loup and McNeill of Gallichoille, all strong supporters of King James VII, were defeated by a government force.

Clachan is also the site of Balinakill House. It was once the home of Coll McAlester, who led the first large settlement of highlanders in North Carolina at Cross Creek in the Cape Fear River valley in 1739, and later the home of Sir William MacKinnon. The house is now available for hire for various occasions.
