= Alexander MacAlister =

Chief of Clan Macalister

Alexander MacAlister was 8th of Loup, Chief of Clan MacAlister.

MacAlister supported the deposed King James VII of Scotland and fought at the battle of Killiecrankie in 1689, in which the forces of King James VII were victorious against the Williamite forces led by Hugh Mackay, however the leader of the Jacobite army John Graham, Viscount of Dundee was killed. According to the traditional shanachies, he is said to have also brought, apart from his clan, members of the MacLachlans from Morvern and Ardgour. It is not known whether he participated in the later defeats at the battle of Dunkeld or battle of Cromdale.

In 1690, he led a force over to Ireland and fought at the battle of the Boyne in support of King James II of Ireland against King William III of England, in which the forces of King James II were defeated.

His son Hector succeeded him.

== Citations ==
Preceded by Eachann Mac Goraidh MacAlasdair	Chief of Clan Macalister; 1647 - ????	Succeeded by Hector MacAlister
