= Battle of the River Dee =

14th-century battle in Scotland

- Part of First War of Scottish Independence
Date	29 June 1308
Location	near Buittle, Scotland 54°49′N 3°44′W
Result	Crown victory

Belligerents
(Kingdom of Scotland) Scottish Crown	Rebels

Commanders and leaders
Edward Bruce	Donald of Islay or Dungal MacDouall (See § Location and identity of Gallovidian leader)

Strength
Less than 1,200	~1,200

Casualties and losses
Unknown, likely heavy	~200 dead

The Battle of the River Dee or the Battle of the River Cree, was fought on 29 June 1308 during the Scottish Wars of Independence near Buittle, on the banks of the River Dee or River Cree, Galloway, Scotland.

Sir Edward de Brus having been left in command in Galloway, Edward led a campaign in Galloway. Edward had defeated John St John during the Battle of Kirroughtree. He then turned his attention to the stronghold of Buittle Castle and the Balliol lands.

On 29 June 1308, the forces of Edward met a force commanded by Donald of Islay or Dungal MacDouall of Galloway and Sir Ingram de Umfraville and Sir Aymer de St John, on the banks of the River Dee at a ford on the river. The forces of MacDouall were routed with heavy losses.

== Location and identity of Gallovidian leader ==
The battle may have been fought near Buittle, on the banks of the River Dee, rather than the Cree as claimed by the Bruce. Specifically, Gesta Annalia II relates that a certain 'Donald of the Isles' led a host of Gallovidians to the River Dee, where they were defeated by Edward Bruce, and the leader was himself captured. (Note: There are numerous manuscript versions of Gesta Annalia II. One identifies him as 'of Mar', another leaves a blank space after his name, indicating that the scribes were unsure as to the man's identity. According to the Bruce, the English forces were led by Aymer St John and Ingram Umfraville. According to the Chronicle of Lanercost, the leaders of the Bruce forces were Edward Bruce, Alexander Lindsay, Robert Boyd, and James Douglas.) Whilst it is possible that the defeated man mentioned by this source might refer to Donald of Islay, an apparent member of Clan Donald, another possibility is that it instead refers to Dungal MacDouall.

A later account of the battle, preserved by the fifteenth-century Scotichronicon, confusingly identifies 'Donald of the Isles' as leader of the Gallovidian forces, but then includes a verse about the clash in which a 'Donald of Islay' is identified as an ally of Edward Bruce. As such, there is reason to suspect that the Bruce-aligned 'Donald' mentioned by this source is identical to Donald of Islay, and that the Gallovidian-aligned 'Donald' is identical to Donald MacCann, a Gallovidian who consistently supported the English against the Bruces, and who disappears from record at about this point in history. (Note: The account given by Scotichronicon further reports that a knight named Roland, a man who may be identical to the otherwise attested Ronald MacGachan, was killed in the clash. It further relates that an island fortress was captured by Edward's force, and that Donald MacCann was thereby captured. The capture of Donald MacCann may mark the point at which the MacCanns submitted to Robert.)

The account of Edward Bruce's campaigning against the Gallovidians, given by the Chronicle of Lanercost, states that his forces were partly composed of men from the Isles. The evidence of Donald of Islay in league with pro-Bruce forces could indicate that Gesta Annalia II was erroneous in placing him and the Islesmen against Edward Bruce's forces. One possibility is that the account given by Chronicle of Lanercost influenced Gesta Annalia II in its identification of Edward Bruce's foe as from the Isles. (Note: It is well known that Angus Og Macdonald, then Lord of the Isles, supported King Robert Bruce throughout his campaign to claim Scotland and often supplied King Robert with galleys, warriors and galloglass. After the defeat of Dungal MacDouall in 1308, Sir Edward Bruce was named Lord of Galloway by King Robert. Although there may be reason to suspect that the battle took place in the context of the well-attested Gallovidian campaigns of 1307 or 1313, because such a clash in 1308 is not corroborated by administrative sources, the fact that the battle is recounted by sources such as the Chronicle of Lanercost, Gesta Annalia II, the Bruce, and Scotichronicon, appears to affirm its historicity. One possible reason that English records may have overlooked the battle is that it was overshadowed by other events of 1308, such as the loss of Inverurie and the herschip of Buchan.)
