= Loup House =

Castle in Argyll and Bute, Scotland

Coordinates: 55.766847°N 5.544196°W

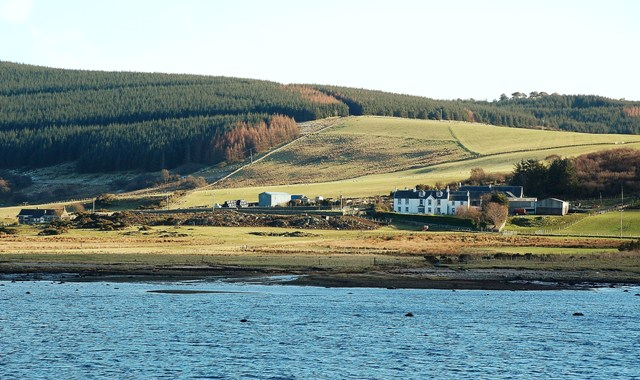
Loup House

Loup House is a manor house north of Clachan on the Kintyre peninsula of Argyll, Scotland. The estate was once home to the chiefs of Clan MacAlister, and the chief still takes the name "MacAlester of Loup". Sir William Mackinnon purchased the estate in 1867.

== Castle ==
A fortified dwelling or castle previously existed upon the site, however it is not known when it was constructed.
