= Ardpatrick House =

Country house in Argyll and Bute, Scotland

Coordinates: 55.7746°N 5.5842°W

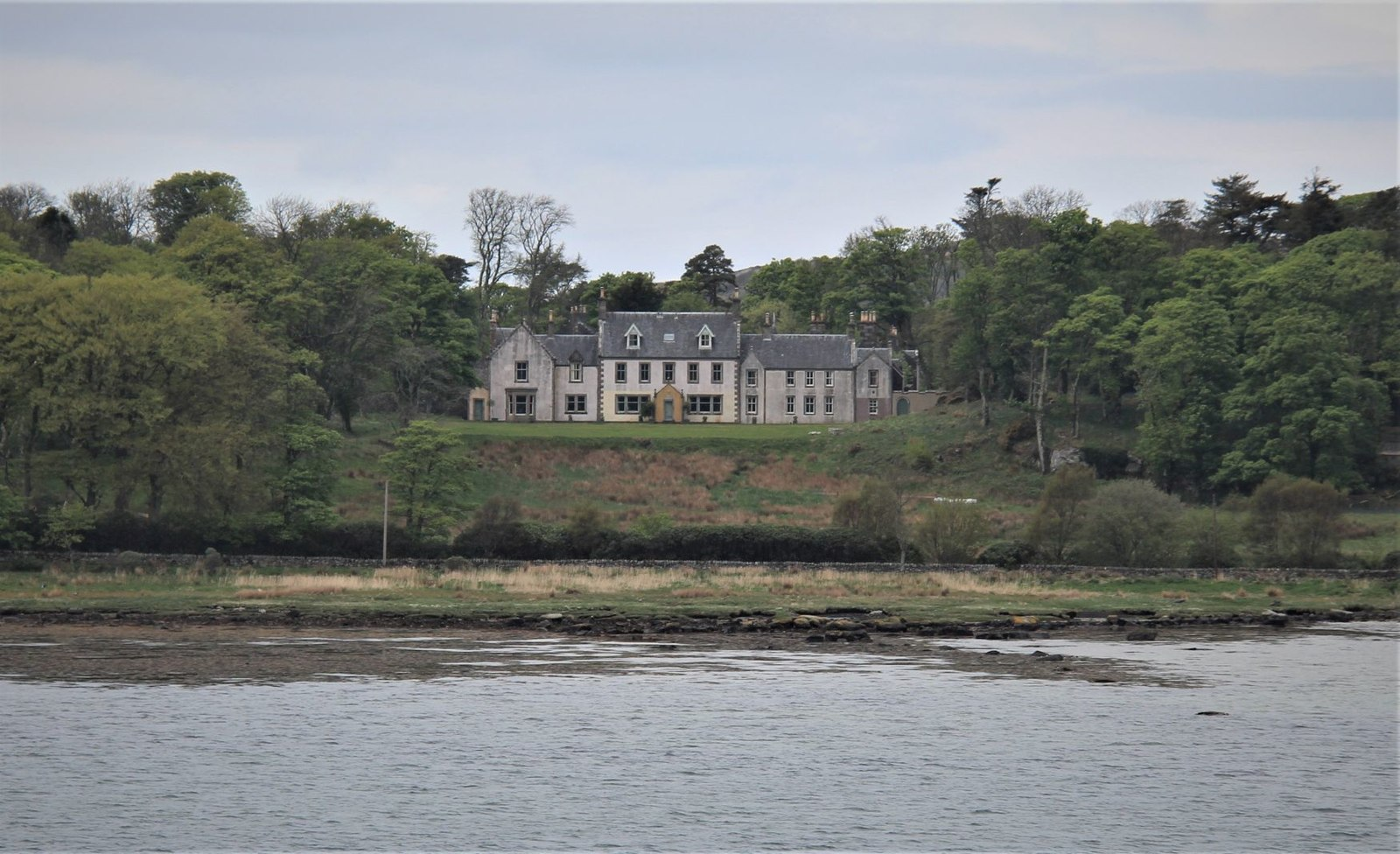
- The house in 2019
- Interactive map of Ardpatrick House

Ardpatrick House is a category-B-listed 18th-century country house in Ardpatrick, South Knapdale, Argyll and Bute, Scotland.

== History ==
A fortified dwelling or castle previously existed upon the site, however it is not known when it was constructed. Upon the formation of Clan MacAlister, becoming independent from Clan MacDonald in 1493, the chief, Iain Dubh (Anglicisation: Black John), created the seat of the clan at Ardpatrick.

The present house was built in 1769 for Angus MacAlester, 11th of Loup, by John Menelaws and Thomas Menelaws, from Greenock. The estate of Ardpatrick, including the cottage of Auchachoan was sold by Alexander MacAllister of Loup in 1796 to Walter Campbell of Skipness, who bought it for his son Colin Campbell.

The south wing was added in 1864-65 by John Honeyman and is dominated by a crow-stepped gable with a corniced canted gable at ground level.

Ardpatrick was the seat of the Campbells of Ardpatrick until 1920. It was then the property of the Stewart family until 1947 when it was sold to Mrs Kenneil.

It was advertised for sale in 2004 when it was described as having.4 reception rooms, 13 bedrooms, 4 bathrooms and a separate flot. The estate comprising 1,113 acres (450 ha) included 3 secondary houses, 7 cottages and a flat, native and commercial woodland, a 30 acre island, farm, rough shooting and stalking. It was sold in 2006 to Caledonian Trust, an Edinburgh based property company. In 2020, Caledonian Trust entered into an agreement to sell the estate to two private individuals.
