= Owen MacEoin Dubh MacAlister =

Owen MacEoin Dubh MacAlister was a son of Alasdair MacEoin Dubh MacAlister, 1st of Loup, Chief of Clan MacAlister. He was killed in battle in Antrim, Ireland in 1571.

== Biography ==
Became Chief of Clan MacAlister, 2nd of Loup, upon the death of his father. Owen was an esteemed galloglass warrior, more esteemed than Sorley Boy MacDonnell. As a reward for his and his warriors service and loyalty to the MacDonnell clan in Antrim, Ireland, Sorley Boy MacDonnell gifted Kinbane Castle to him. Owen was killed in 1571 during a skirmish with the Carrickfergus garrison, fighting alongside Sorley Boy.

Preceded by Alasdair Mac Aonghas MacAlasdair	Chief of Clan Macalister ?? - 1571	Succeeded by Eachann Mac Owen MacAlister
