= Domhnall mac Raghnaill =

Hebridean noble

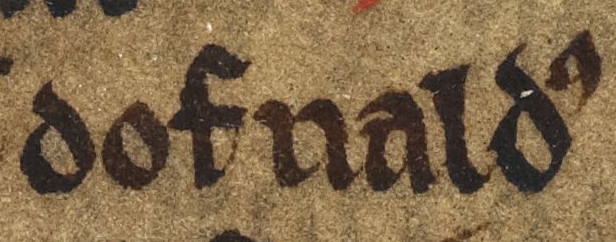
- Domhnall's apparent name as it appears on folio 47v of British Library Cotton MS Julius A VII (the Chronicle of Mann): "Dofnaldus"
- Successor: Aonghus Mór
- Noble family: Clann Somhairle
- Issue: Aonghus Mór, Alasdair Mór
- Father: Raghnall mac Somhairle

Domhnall mac Raghnaill was a Hebridean noble in the late 12th and early 13th centuries. He is the eponymous progenitor of Clan Donald (Clann Dhòmhnaill, "Children of Donald"). For this reason some traditions accumulated around him in the later Middle Ages and early modern period. His vast impact on culture and in the centuries remains today. Despite his role as the historical figurehead of one of the world's most famous kindreds and surnames, there is almost no contemporary evidence yielding certain information about his life.

His place in the genealogical tradition of the MacDonalds is the only reason for believing in his existence, a genealogical tradition that not all historians have accepted. Beyond his actual existence, there is little that is certain. Three entries in Irish annals may discuss him, though he is never named; a praise poem surviving from the early modern period may be descended from a poem originally written for him; a miracle in a Manx chronicle may or may not have Domhnall as its subject; and a doubtful charter surviving from a similarly late era was allegedly issued by him.

== Origins ==
Domhnall was, reputedly, the son of Raghnall (fl. 1192), son of Somhairle (died 1164). The 17th-century History of the Macdonalds by Hugh MacDonald of Sleat claimed that Domhnall's father Raghnall had married a daughter or sister of the early-14th-century hero Thomas Randolph, Earl of Moray. Sellar suggested that this tradition may have derived from a garbled version of reality. Perhaps, Sellar argued, his mother was a daughter of William fitz Duncan. The latter was another famous earl of Moray, but one who lived in the 12th rather than the 14th century.

In a charter to Paisley Abbey Domhnall's father Raghnall is given a wife named Fonia (Fionnghuala?), though there is no direct proof that this was the name of Domhnall's mother. Raghnall, carrying the legacy of his own father Somhairle, was a powerful Argyll and Hebridean magnate who, depending on context, bore the titles 'King of the Isles', 'Lord of Argyll and Kintyre', and 'lord of the Hebrides' (Inchegal). His father's legacy was such that he became the ancestor figure of both Clann Ruaidhrí and Clan Donald.

== Possible evidence of life ==
=== Annals of Ulster ===
There are no certain contemporary notices of Domhnall, and Domhnall's existence is not explicitly attested in any reliable contemporary source datable to any particular year. However, in 1212, Domhnall may have been one of the "sons of Raghnall" who suffered some kind of military defeat at the hands of the men of the Isle of Skye. The Annals of Ulster, reporting for the year 1209, recorded that:

A battle was fought by the sons of Raghnall, son of Somhairle, against the men of Skye, wherein slaughter was inflicted upon them.

A similar report from the same source has the "sons of Raghnaill" join in a raid on the Irish city of Derry led by Tomás Mac Uchtraigh, brother of Alan, Lord of Galloway. Under the year 1212 it related that:

Tomás Mac Uchtraigh, with the sons of Raghnall, son of Somhairle, came to Derry of St. Colum-Cille with six and seventy ships and the town was greatly destroyed by them and Inis-Eogain was completely destroyed by them and by the Cenél Conaill.

Two years later, a similar raid by Tomás is mentioned by the same source, though the only "son of Raghnall" reported as present that time was Domhnall's older brother, Ruaidhrí mac Raghnaill.

=== Domhnall mac Raghnaill, Rosg Mall ===
A recently rediscovered poem—though from a 17th-century manuscript written by Niall MacMhuirich—was addressed to one Domhnall mac Raghnaill, Rosg Mall ("Domhnall mac Raghnaill, of the Stately Gaze"). It is possible that this may refer to the same Domhnall mac Raghnaill, a claim made by its recent editor. The poem gives little information. Besides associating him with Lennox, a quatrain addressed him as:

Ó Ghothfruigh ó hÁmhlaibh Fhinn,	Descendant of Gofraidh, descendant of Amhlaibh Fionn;,
a ghallmhaoir ó thuinn go tuinn,	his Gall stewards from sea to sea;
fleasga donna a ndiaidh an Ghoill,	following the Gall are stout youths;
do chloinn Bhriain is Cholla is Chuinn.	of the progeny of Brian and Colla and Conn.

Gall is a word that originally meant "Foreigner" or "Norseman" (later "Lowlander"), and might be meant to refer to someone from the region of Innse Gall, i.e. from the Hebrides. It is not clear who Gofraidh or Amhlaibh Fionn are, but they may refer to some of the Norse–Gaelic rulers of Mann and Dublin, possibly Amhlaibh Conung and Gofraidh Crobhán.

=== Miracle from the Manx chronicle ===
The Chronicle of the Kings of Man related a story that may have involved Domhnall. In 1249, according to the text, following the death of Haraldr Óláfsson, King of Mann, the new ruler Haraldr Guðrøðarson persecuted one of the old king's favourite vassals. This persecuted vassal, described as an "aged man", was named as Dofnaldus, i.e. Domhnall. Domhnall and his young son were subsequently imprisoned. Owing to the intervention of St Mary, Domhnall and his son managed to escape, and brought their thanks and story to the Abbey of St Mary of Rushen, the monastic house at which the Chronicle was kept.

=== Possible charter ===
There is a charter allegedly issued by Domhnall to Paisley Abbey, found in the cartulary of that abbey. In this charter Domhnall is given no title, instead merely described by his genealogy: Douenaldus filius Reginaldi filii Sumerledi, "Domhnall, son of Raghnall, son of Somhairle". This charter is thought by some historians to be spurious, mainly because the witness list and wording of the charter are, in the words of Alex Woolf, "suspiciously similar" to those in a genuine charter of Domhnall's son Aonghus Mór. Presumably, the explanation is that the monks of Paisley Abbey at some later stage may have thought it in their interest to replicate Aonghus Mór's charter in order to add the authority of the founder of Clan Donald to their land rights.

== Death ==
In 1247 Maurice fitz Gerald, Justiciar of Ireland, invaded the territory of Maol Seachlainn Ó Domhnaill, King of Tír Chonaill, defeating and killing this Irish king at the Battle of Ballyshannon. According to the Annals of Loch Cé, one of Maoilsheachlainn's allies who died at Ballyshannon was a Mac Somhairle, a "Descendant of Somhairle":

Mac Somhairle, king of Argyll, and the nobles of the Cenel-Conaill besides, were slain.

The Irish historian Seán Duffy suggested that this "Mac Somhairle" was Domhnall mac Raghnall. Duffy's main argument is that the 18th-century Book of Clanranald relayed a tradition that Domhnall had been invited by the Irish at Tara to come "to take the headship of the Western Isles and the greater part of the Gaels".

McDonald believed that this "Mac Somhairle" referred to Donnchadh mac Dubhghaill, while Sellar thought that the clear favourite for this "Mac Somhairle" should be Domhnall's older brother Ruaidhrí. Alex Woolf more recently offered an extended case for the latter view, arguing on a number of grounds that Ruaidhrí is by far the best candidate.

Assuming that Domhnall is not the "dead man at Ballyshannon", the date of Domhnall's death cannot be fixed. MacDonald tradition placed it in 1289, a tradition usually rejected by modern historians as falling far too late. R. Andrew McDonald suggested that Domhnall's death must have taken place before 1263, when King Haakon collected the allegiance of Aonghus Mór in the Hebrides. Alex Woolf argued that it very likely must have occurred before February 1256, when Domhnall's son Aonghus Mór made a grant to Paisley Abbey is his own name as "Lord of Islay", suggesting at the very least that Domhnall had retired.

== Legacy ==
Domhnall's main legacy is being the eponymous founding figure of the famous MacDonald kindred of Islay. Early modern MacDonald tradition thought of Domhnall as a "Lord of the Isles", like his descendants. One such tradition related that King Alexander II of Scotland sent a messenger to Domhnall, requesting that he hold the Isles from Alexander rather than the "King of Denmark"; Domhnall was said to have responded that his predecessors

Had their rights of the Isles from the crown of Denmark, which were renewed by the present king thereof.

This anachronistic portrayal of the struggle between King Haakon IV of Norway and the Scottish crown for overlordship of the western seaboard of Scotland, giving Domhnall such a senior role, does not fit with the contemporary evidence. When it was written down, Denmark ruled Norway and the MacDonalds were well established as the rulers the Isles. However, during most of his life Domhnall was probably subordinate to his older brother, Ruaidhrí mac Raghnaill, and as Alex Woolf has said "there is little or no explicit contemporary evidence that Domhnall was a significant figure during his lifetime".

Nevertheless, Domhnall appears to have left his son Aonghus Mór a lordship of respectable size centred on Islay, while his reputedly younger son Alasdair Mór appears to have been left lands in Kintyre. According to a praise-poem written for this son, the realm the latter inherited from Domhnall included "every house from Mull to Kintyre" (gach teach ó Mhuile go Maoil).
