= Clan MacAlister =

Scottish clan

- MacAlasdair
- Crest: A dexter hand holding a dagger in pale, all proper
- Motto: Fortiter (Boldly)
- Slogan: Per mare per terras (By sea and by land)

Profile
- Region: Highland
- District: Kintyre
- Plant badge: Heath

Chief
- William St John Somerville McAlester of Loup and Kennox
- The Chief of the Name and Arms of MacAlister (Mac Iain Duibh)
- Seat: Kennox House
- Historic seat: Tarbert Castle
Septs of Clan MacAlister
Alastair, Alexander, Alison, Alistair, Allison, Allister, Lester, Loub, Louby, Loup, Loupe, Luih, MacAlaster, MacAlester, MacAlister, MacAllaster, MacAllister, MacAllister, McSporan, McSporran, Sanders, Sanderson, Saunders, Saunderson
Clan branches
MacAlister of Tarbet
MacAlister of Glenbarr
Alexanders of Menstrie
MacAlister of Antrim
Allied clans
Clan Donald
Clan Stewart
Rival clans
Clan Campbell
Clan MacDougall

Clan MacAlister is a Highland Scottish clan and the earliest branch to split off from Clan Donald. The clan claims descent from Alasdair Mòr, a younger son of Domhnall mac Raghnaill, the progenitor of Clan Donald.

Clan MacAlister played an active role in regional conflicts across the Hebrides and Ulster, maintaining strategic alliances while frequently feuding with rival families, including Clan Campbell. By the late 15th century, the clan seat was formally established at Loup in Kintyre, which served as their ancestral stronghold until the early 19th century, when debts forced the sale of the estate in favor of property in the Scottish Lowlands. Unlike many neighboring Highland clans, Clan MacAlister did not officially join the Jacobite rising of 1745, which allowed the chief to preserve their ancestral status and landholdings.

Clan MacAlister has a chief that is recognized by the Court of the Lord Lyon, and the Lord Lyon King of Arms, who is the heraldic authority in Scotland.

== History of the clan ==
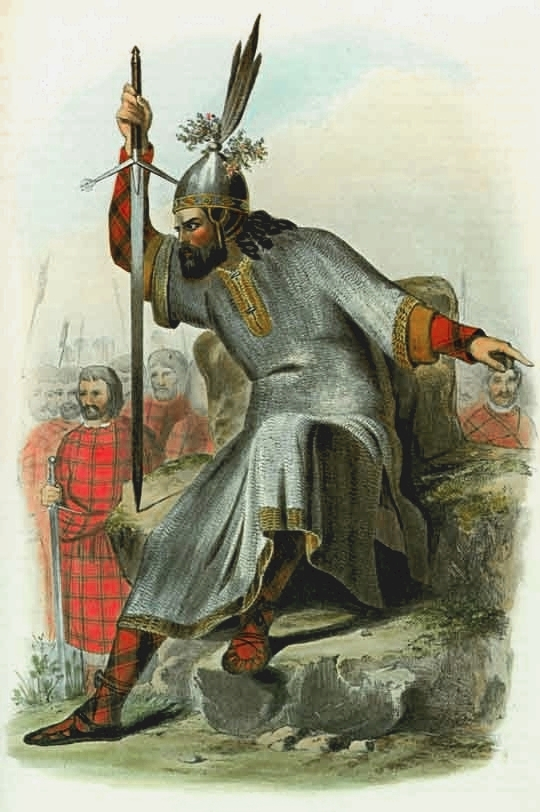
R.R. McIan's Victorian era romanticised depiction of a Macdonald, lord of the Isles.

=== Origins ===
Clan MacAlister was originally a branch of Clan Donald—one of the largest Scottish clans. The eponymous ancestor of Clan Donald is Domhnall, son of Raghnall, son of Somhairle. Traditional Clan Donald genealogies, created in the later Middle Ages, give the clan a descent from various legendary Irish figures. Modern historians, however, distrust these traditional genealogies, and consider Somhairle, son of Gille Brighde to be earliest ancestor for whom there is secure historical evidence. Somhairle, himself, was a 12th-century leader, styled "king of the isles" and "king of Argyll"; yet there is no reliable account for his rise to power.

=== Confusion and the clan's founder ===
Today, Clan MacAlister claims to descend from Alasdair Mòr, son of Domhnall, founder of Clan Donald. There has, however, been confusion as to who really was the clan's founder. This is because within a generation there lived two prominent Alasdairs (an uncle and nephew). Both of these men left many sons, however, their immediate posterity are not clearly connected with definite area. The lack of charter evidence clouds the true history of the clan; as does the fact that for about two hundred years, the descendants of both men did not form an organised clan of their own.

Alasdair Mòr first appears on record in 1253, when is recorded as witnessing a charter by his brother, Aonghas Mór a Íle, to the Paisley Abbey. According to Angus and Archibald Macdonald, he must have been a prominent man, being the only recorded brother of the Aonghas Mór. A. and A. Macdonald state that he was recorded in the Irish Annals, in 1299, as being a man noted for "hospitality and excellence". In that year he was slain in a conflict with Alasdair of Argyll and the MacDougalls. According to the traditional shanachies, Alasdair Mòr had at least five sons: Domhnall, Gofraidh, Donnchadh, Eoin and Eachann. He was succeeded by Domhnall.

==== Younger sons of Alasdair Mòr ====
By the early 14th century, descendants of Alasdair Mòr had settled in Stirlingshire. Domhnall's son, Gilbert de Insula, son of Domhnall, received a charter for the lands of Glorat in the parish of Campsie in 1330. He is traditionally regarded as the ancestor of the Alexanders of Menstrie, who were created Earls of Stirling in 1633. Little is recorded of Gofraidh's descendants beyond references in MS 1467. A. and A. Macdonald could not find any other definite piece of information about the descendants of Gofraidh. According to A. and A. Macdonald, Donnchadh, third son of Alasdair Mòr, possessed lands in Glenorchy, but his branch appears to have lost them by 1343, when King David II granted the estate of Donnchadh's deceased son, Eoin, to Alexander MacNaughtane. Traditional seanchaidh accounts link Alasdair Mòr's youngest son, Eachann, to Siothach an Dronan, who migrated to Ireland and founded Clan Sheehy (MacSithigh) of Munster. By 1552, this family was prominent in Munster and Leinster as gallowglass mercenaries in the service of the O'Neills.

==== Successors of Alasdair Mòr ====
Domhnall, son of Alasdair Mòr, and his son Alasdair both swore fealty to Edward I of England in 1291. Alasdair was succeeded by his son Raghnall, who campaigned in Ulster in 1366 during the O'Neill conflicts. The succession of the subsequent chiefs is poorly documented; Raghnall was succeeded around 1400 by an Alasdair, who was in turn succeeded by Eoin Dubh. From Eoin Dubh, modern chiefs derive their Gaelic patronymic, Mac Iain Duibh. A. and A. Macdonald state that this title caused historical confusion with Clann Eoin Duibh, the descendants of another Eoin Dubh who was the eldest son of the forfeited Hebridean magnate Alasdair Og.

=== 15th century ===
Eoin Dubh was succeeded by Charles, who in 1481 was appointed by King James III to the Stewartry of Kintyre for life. Along with this royal appointment, Charles received a fen farm grant of 40 merklands across North and South Kintyre, including holdings at Dunaverty, Edyne, Kildovy, and Kilmichell. There is no mention of Loup and A. Macdonald stated that the lands were probably already in his possession, and had likely been in his family's possession for quite some time.

=== 16th century ===
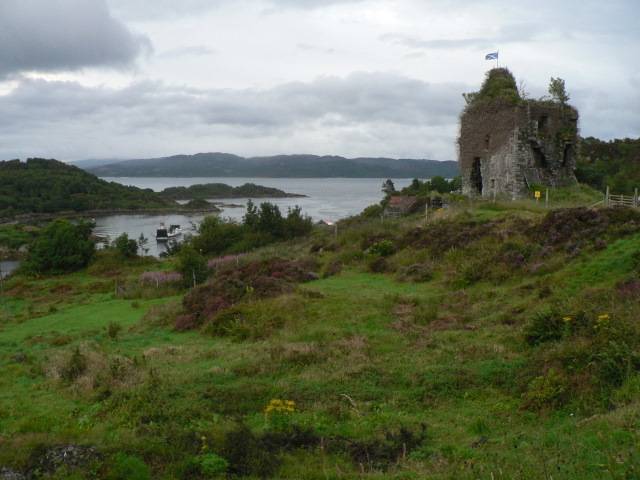
Tarbert Castle was associated with the MacAlisters of Tarbert.

Charles was succeeded by his son, John, whose existence is recorded solely through the patronymic of his own son, Angus John Dowson of Loup. In 1515, Angus was among the Argyll chieftains granted royal protection by the Duke of Albany as "familiars and servitors" of Colin, Earl of Argyll. Angus was succeeded by Alexander MacAlister, who joined the Macleans and Clan Donald South in invading the Campbell territories of Rosneath, Lennox, and Craignish in 1529. He was later denounced as a rebel for his failure to find security for his future good behaviour.

During the 15th and 16th centuries, MacAlister clansmen acquired land on the nearby islands of Arran and Bute, including a 1506 grant of Longilwenach to Donald MacAlister, whose descendants established a significant local presence. Although the chiefs of Clan MacAlister held no property in Buteshire themselves, the actions and feuds of these island-based clansmen frequently embroiled the chiefship in regional legal and political troubles.

Following the forfeiture of the Lordship of the Isles in 1493, Clan MacAlister sought protection under the MacDonnells of Dunnyveg, as well as the Earls of Argyll and Hamilton. Between 1540 and 1572, the clan actively supported Sorley Boy MacDonnell's military campaigns in Ulster and according to A. and A. Macdonald, there is reason to believe that Clan MacAlister gave him some of his most strenuous support. Around 1571–1572, "Owen Mc Owen duffe Mc Alastrain, called the Lord of Loop" (believed to be a son of Chief Alexander MacAlister) was slain fighting English forces in Ireland. Following the death of Chief John in 1572, his son Alexander succeeded to the chiefship, received a charter from the Earl of Argyll in 1573, and was subsequently ordered by an Act of Parliament to deliver hostages to ensure peaceable behavior.

In 1587, Alexander MacAlister of Loup was recorded in the General Band of 1587, in which Highland chiefs were held accountable by the Government for their tenants. In 1590, the clan rendered a bond of dependence and service to Lord John Hamilton; shortly afterwards a similar bond was given by the Tutor of Loup and clan members also Lord John Hamilton. A. and A. Macdonald state that Clan MacAlister was in no way dependent on the Hamiltons in Kintyre, yet those MacAlisters that settled in Arran and Bute had done so in the lands where the Hamiltons were lords. In 1591, Godfrey MacAlister of Loup received a charter from the Earl of Argyll.

In 1598, a serious quarrel broke out between Godfrey MacAlister of Loup, who had just reached the age of majority, and his former tutor and guardian. It is unknown what the reasons for the quarrel were, yet what is known is that MacAlister of Loup had the former tutor murdered. The sons of the murdered man then fled to Askomull House which was the Kintyre residence of Angus Macdonald of Dunyvaig. The historians A. and A. Macdonald stated that Macdonald of Dunyvaig was the tutor's sons' clan superior. MacAlister of Loup was however aided by Sir James Macdonald, younger of Dunyvaig and surrounded the house with several hundred armed men.

=== 17th century ===
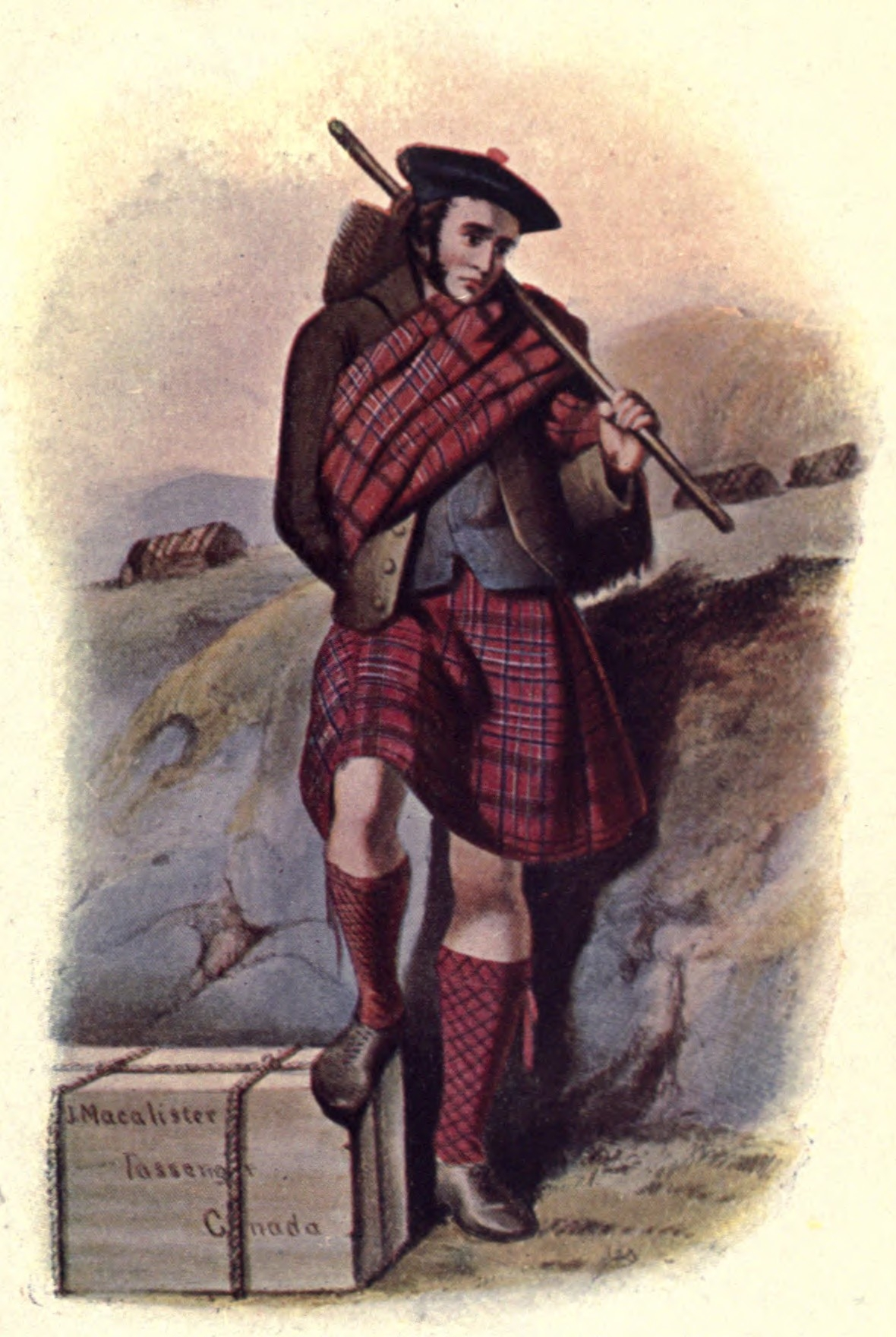
R.R. McIan's Victorian era romanticised depiction of a sorrowful MacAlister clansman about to emigrate to Canada during the Highland Clearances.

In 1603, Archibald MacAlister, heir of Tarbert, joined Campbell of Auchinbreck in a 1200 men raid on Bute, ravaging the lands of Marion Stewart and Ninian Stewart, Sheriff of Bute. The leaders were declared rebels after failing to answer a Privy Council summons. In 1605, the Privy Council ordered Archibald MacAlister of Loup and his tutor, John MacAlister, to produce their land titles under threat of forfeiture; A. and A. Macdonald state that MacAlister of Loup complied and successfully secured formal titles for his lands from the Earl of Argyll.

In 1614, Alexander MacAlister betrayed his superior, the Earl of Argyll, by siding with the rebel Angus Og MacDonald at Dunyveg Castle; he was subsequently convicted of treason and hanged. Following a quiet period, conflict re-emerged in 1623 through Godfrey MacAlister of Tarbert, son of the Tarbert chief. Godfrey conducted extensive raids against Lowland landowners and became embroiled in a bitter dispute. A. and A. Macdonald made note of a serious quarrel between Godfrey MacAlister of Tarbet and Walter MacAulay of Ardincaple, chief of Clan MacAulay. Both Tarbert and Ardincaple claimed to be depute to the Admiral of the Western Seas. This feud forced various supporters to post thousands of merks in bonds of caution to prevent further violence. A. and A. Macdonald were unsure of the outcome of this particular quarrel, stating: "As often happens regarding Highland quarrels and delinquencies, the records leave us enquiring wonderingly, and failing to answer the question, how this matter was settled, if it was settled at all".

In 1631, Archibald MacAlister of Tarbet visited William Alexander, 1st Earl of Stirling and acknowledged him as his chief. This was despite the fact the MacAlisters of Loup are today considered the chiefs of the clan. In 1689, a French ship which had sailed from Ireland reached Kintyre and was taken by MacAlister of Loup and Angus Campbell of Kilberry. The two lairds put the ship under guard and wrote to Argyll, who was attending the Convention of the Estates, asking for instructions as to what to do with it. According to A. and A. Macdonald, there is evidence to suggest that members of Clan MacAlister, possibly under their chief Alexander MacAlister, 8th of Loup, took part in the Battle of Killiecrankie.

=== 18th century to present ===
The arms of Somerville-McAlester of Loup and Kennox, listed by John Burke in 1835.

In the years spanning from 1689 to 1704 there is little to no record of the clan. However, in the year 1704, during the first parliament of Queen Anne, Alexander MacAlister of Loup and Archibald MacAlister of Tarbert are recorded as Commissioners of Supply for Argyll. By 1706, Tarbert had ceased to be a part of the family of the MacAlisters of Tarbert, as the estate into the possession of a Maclean. Alexander MacAlister of Loup was succeeded by his son, Godfrey, who was in turn succeeded by his son. During this period, the chiefly line of the clan severed all ties with Kintyre; the family mansion of Ardpatrick House was sold to Walter Campbell of Islay, after which Loup also passed out of the hands of the chiefly family.

Charles, 12th of Loup married the daughter and heiress of William Somerville of Kennox in 1792. In consequence, he assumed the name and arms of Somerville along with his own and the seat of the family was since then located in the Scottish Lowlands at Kennox, in Ayrshire. He died in 1847 and was succeeded by his son, Charles. Charles was succeeded by his son, Charles. Charles Somerville McAlester of Loup and Kennox died in 1903 and was succeeded by his son, Charles Godfrey Somerville McAlester of Loup and Kennox. Today the chiefly line has also lost possession of their Kennox lands. The current chief of the clan is William St John Somerville McAlester of Loup and Kennox who lives in England. The current chief is a member of the Standing Council of Scottish Chiefs. Today there is a clan centre located at Glenbarr Abbey.

== Clan profile ==
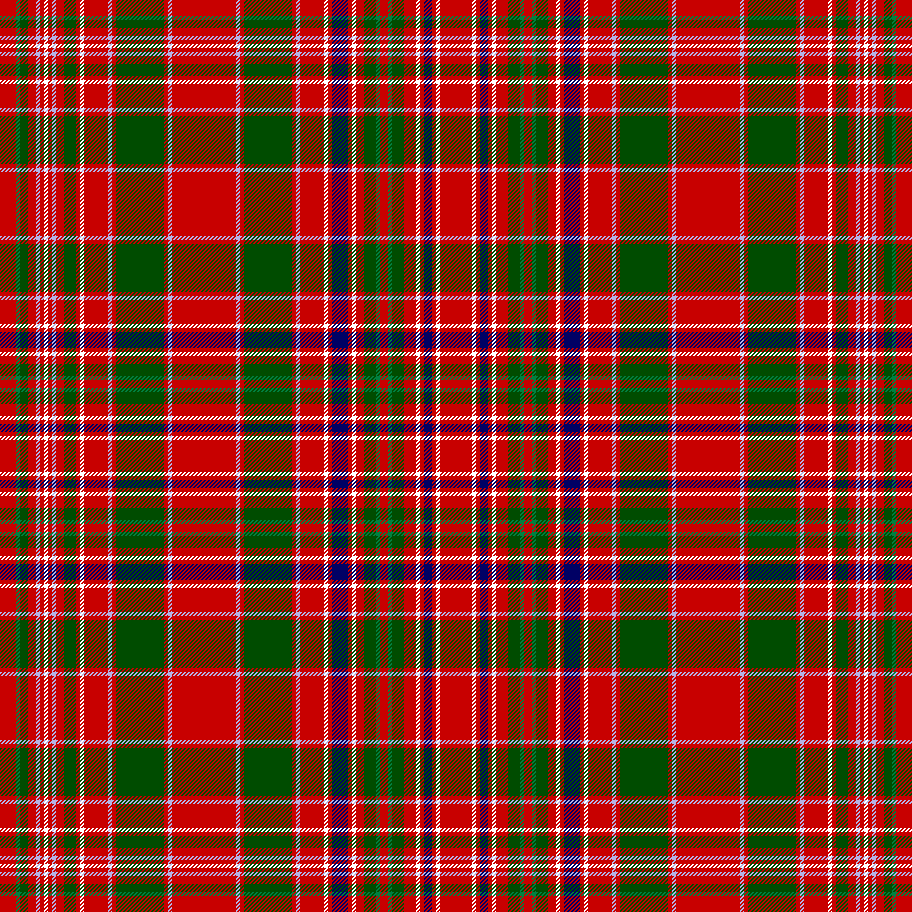
This particular MacAlister tartan dates from the early 19th century.

- Clan chief: The current chief of the clan is William St John Somerville McAlester of Loup and Kennox, Chief of the Name and Arms of MacAlister. The chief was recognised as such by the Lord Lyon King of Arms, in 1991. The Gaelic designation of the chiefs of Clan MacAlister is Mac Iain Duibh in reference to Eoin Dubh, from whom the MacAlisters of Loup claim to descend.
- Chiefly arms: The current chief's coat of arms is blazoned: Or, an eagle displayed gules armed sable surmounted on the breast of a galley of the first within a bordure of the third charged with three cross crosslets fitchée argent. The supporters: (on a compartment entwined with an escrol bearing the second motto) dexter, a bear pierced in the back with an arrow all proper; sinister, an eagle proper. The motto: fortiter; and on the compartment: per mare per terras. The mottoes translate from Latin as "boldly" and "by sea and land". The crest: a dexter arm in armour erect, the hand holding a dagger in pale all proper.
- Clan member's crest badge: The crest badge suitable for members of the clan contains the chief's heraldic crest and motto. Motto: fortiter. Crest: a dexter arm in armour erect, the hand holding a dagger in pale all proper.
- Clan badge: According to Robert Bain, the plant badge of the clan is heath.
- Tartan: There are several tartans attributed to the surname MacAlister. Contemporary accounts of Flora Macdonald suggest that the MacAlisters wore the Macdonald tartan at that time. The tartan pictured right dates from the 19th century and was approved as a clan tartan by the chief in 1845. Another approved tartan is the 'MacAlister dress' tartan. It is a modern tartan that was approved by the clan chief in 2005. It is also the official tartan of the MacAlister Clan Society of North America.
- Branches of the clan: The principal cadet of the MacAlisters of Loup were the MacAlisters of Tarbet. Several members from this branch were for a time, constables of Tarbert Castle on Loch Fyne. Another branch of the clan are the MacAlisters of Glenbarr, who trace their descent from Eoin Dubh.

== McAlister Genealogy Resources ==
- Clan McAlister of America (CMA) is a non-profit organization whose mission is searching for, preserving, and sharing McAlister (of whatever spelling) genealogy and history from around the world. The public website (and member-only document repository) currently identifies over 350 historical McAlister Family Lines covering over 100,000 individuals. CMA also collaborates with FamilyTreeDNA in a robust “McAlister DNA Project,” viewable on the CMA web site, using Y-DNA, mitochondrial DNA, and autosomal DNA to identify familial connections.

== Sources ==
- Bain, Robert (1983). MacDougall, Margaret O (ed.). The Clans and Tartans of Scotland. Heraldic advisor Stewart-Blacker, P. E. Glasgow: Collins. ISBN 0-00-411117-6.
- Burke, John (1835). A Genealogical and Heraldic History of the Commoners of Great Britain and Ireland. Vol. 3. London: Henry Colburn.
- Eyre-Todd, George (1923). The Highland clans of Scotland; their History and Traditions. Vol. 1. New York: D. Appleton.
- Fox-Davies, Arthur Charles (1929). Armorial Families: A Directory of Gentlemen of Coat-Armour. Vol. 2 (7th ed.). London: Hurst & Blackett Ltd.
- Johnston, T. B.; Robertson, James A. (1899). Dickson, William Kirk (ed.). Historical Geography of the Clans of Scotland (3rd ed.). London and Edinburgh: W. & A. K. Johnston.
- McAndrew, Bruce A (2006). Scotland's Historic Heraldry.
- Macdonald, Angus; Macdonald, Archibald (1900). The Clan Donald. Vol. 2. Inverness: The Northern Counties Publishing Company, Ltd.
- Macdonald, Angus; Macdonald, Archibald (1900). The Clan Donald. Vol. 3. Inverness: The Northern Counties Publishing Company, Ltd.
- Maclauchlan, Thomas; Wilson, John (1875). Keltie, John Scott (ed.). A History of the Scottish Highlands, Highland Clans and Highland Regiments. Vol. 2. Edinburgh: A. Fullarton & Co.
- Way, George; Squire, Romilly (2000). Clans & Tartans. Glasgow: HarperCollins. ISBN 0-00-472501-8.
- Woolf, Alex (2007). From Pictland to Alba, 789–1070. Edinburgh: Edinburgh University Press. ISBN 978-0-7486-1233-8.
