= Alasdair Mór =

Scottish nobleman

Alasdair Mór mac Domhnaill was a younger son of Domhnall mac Raghnaill—the eponymous ancestor of Clan Donald. He first appears on record in 1253, when it is recorded as witnessing a charter by his brother, Aonghus Mór, to Paisley Abbey. According to the 19th century Clan Donald historians Angus and Archibald Macdonald, Alasdair Mór must have been a prominent man as he is the only recorded brother of Aonghus Mór. He is recorded in the Annals of Connacht, in the year 1299, as being a man noted for being a "generous and bounteous man". In that year he was slain in a conflict with Alasdair of Argyll and the MacDougalls. He is said to have had at least five sons: Dòmhnall, Gòraidh, Donnchadh, Eoin and Eachann. Alasdair Mòr was succeeded in the representation of his clan by Dòmhnall. Today he is considered to be the eponymous ancestor of Clan MacAlister.
