= Domhnall mac Alasdair =

Domhnall's name as it appears on folio 1v of National Library of Scotland Advocates' 72.1.1: "domnall mac alasdair mhic domnaill".

Domhnall mac Alasdair was a son of Alasdair Mór mac Domhnaill, and a member of Clann Domhnaill. Domhnall is attested by the fifteenth-century manuscript National Library of Scotland Advocates' 72.1.1 (also known as 1467 MS and 1450 MS). He may be identical to Domhnall of Islay. The latter's attestations suggest that he was a contestant to the Clann Domhnaill lordship, and may have possessed the chiefship.
