= Kennox House =

House in North Ayrshire, Scotland

Coordinates: 55.670993°N 4.569871°W

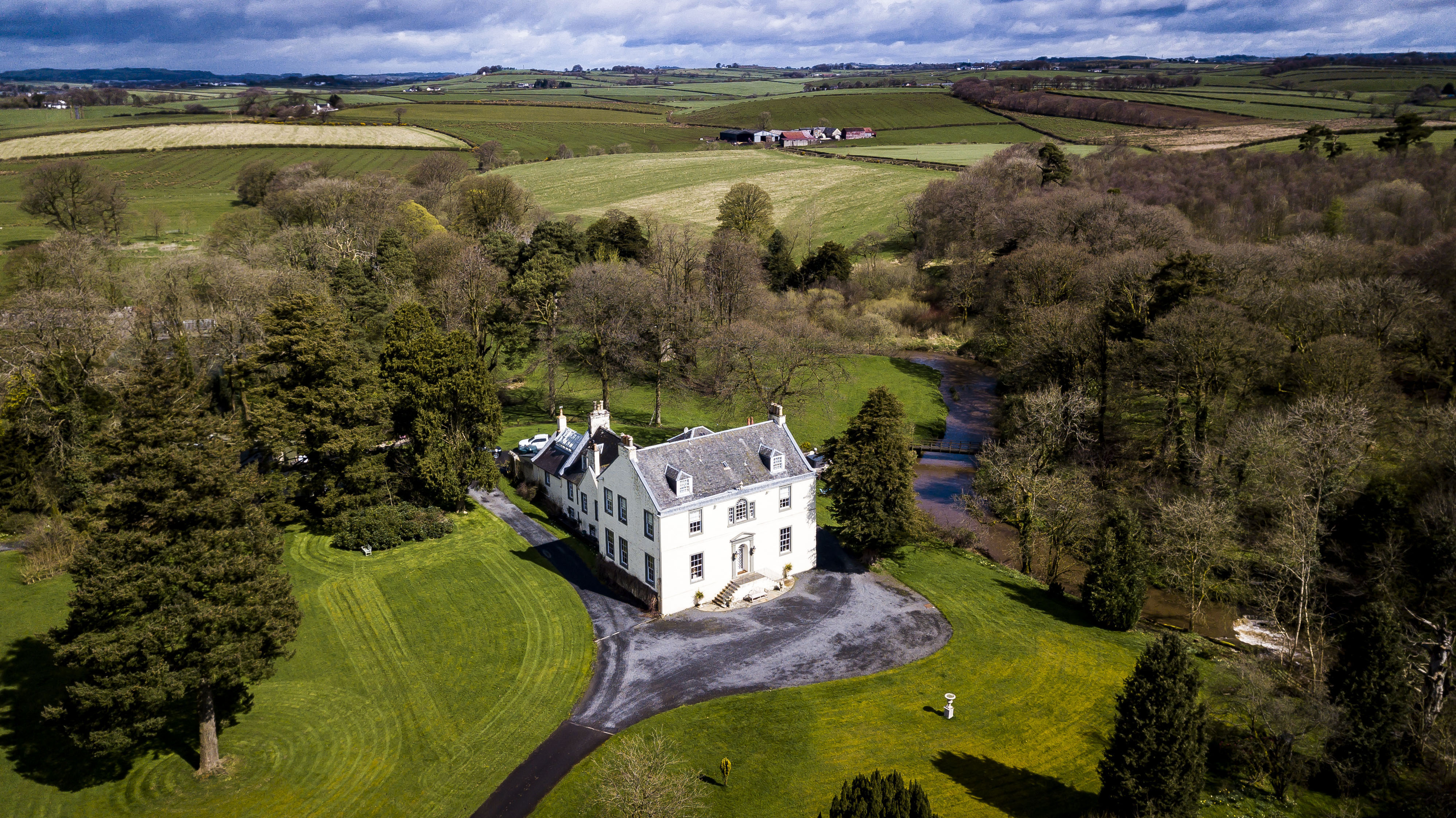
Aerial view of Kennox House

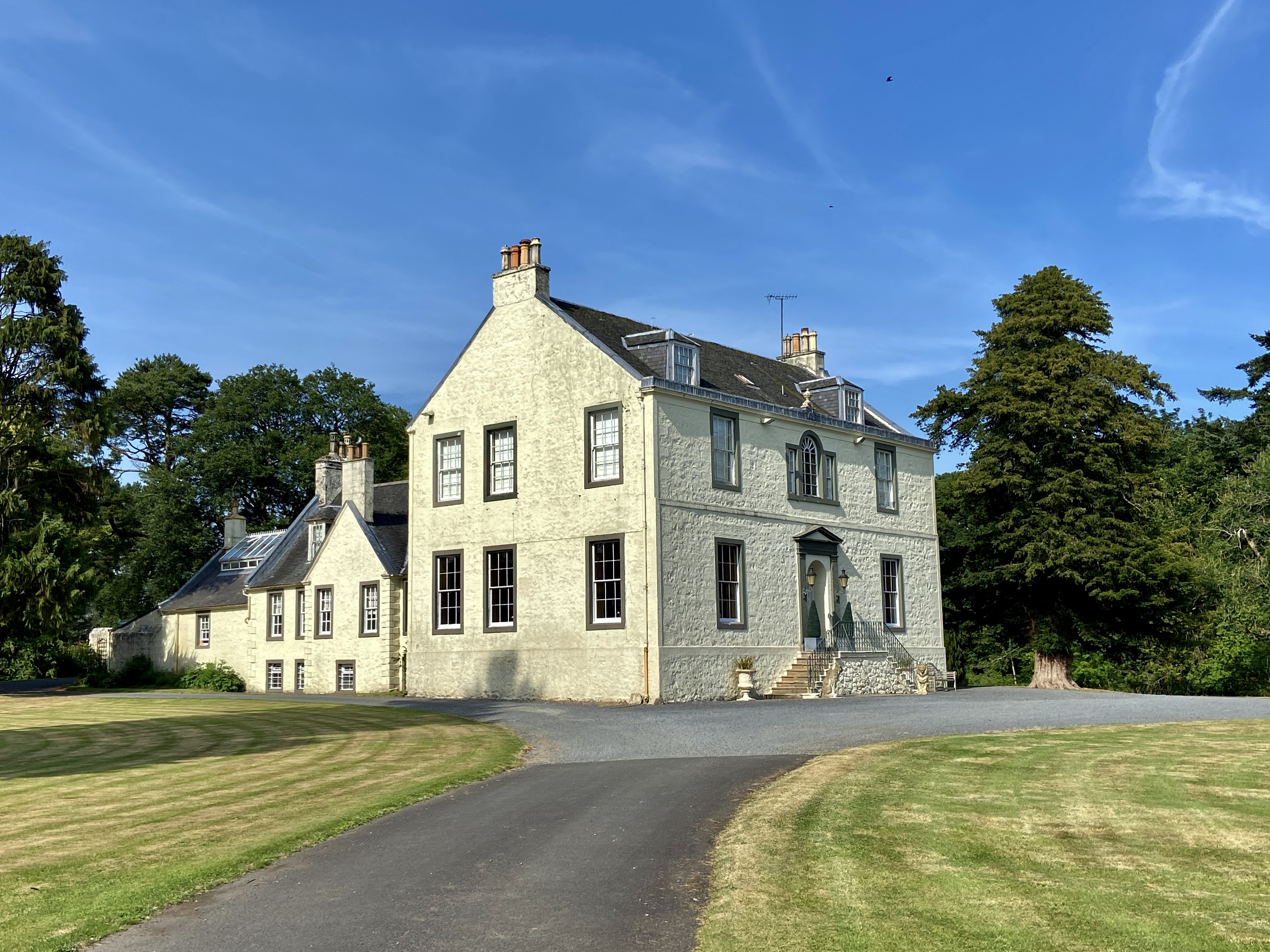
A view of Kennox House built c1700 in East Ayrshire, Scotland

Kennox House is situated on Kilwinning Road between Stewarton to Torranyard in North Ayrshire, Parish of Dunlop, Scotland. The house overlooks the Glazert Burn, which runs into the Annick Water at Watermeetings.

== History ==
=== Crivoch House ===
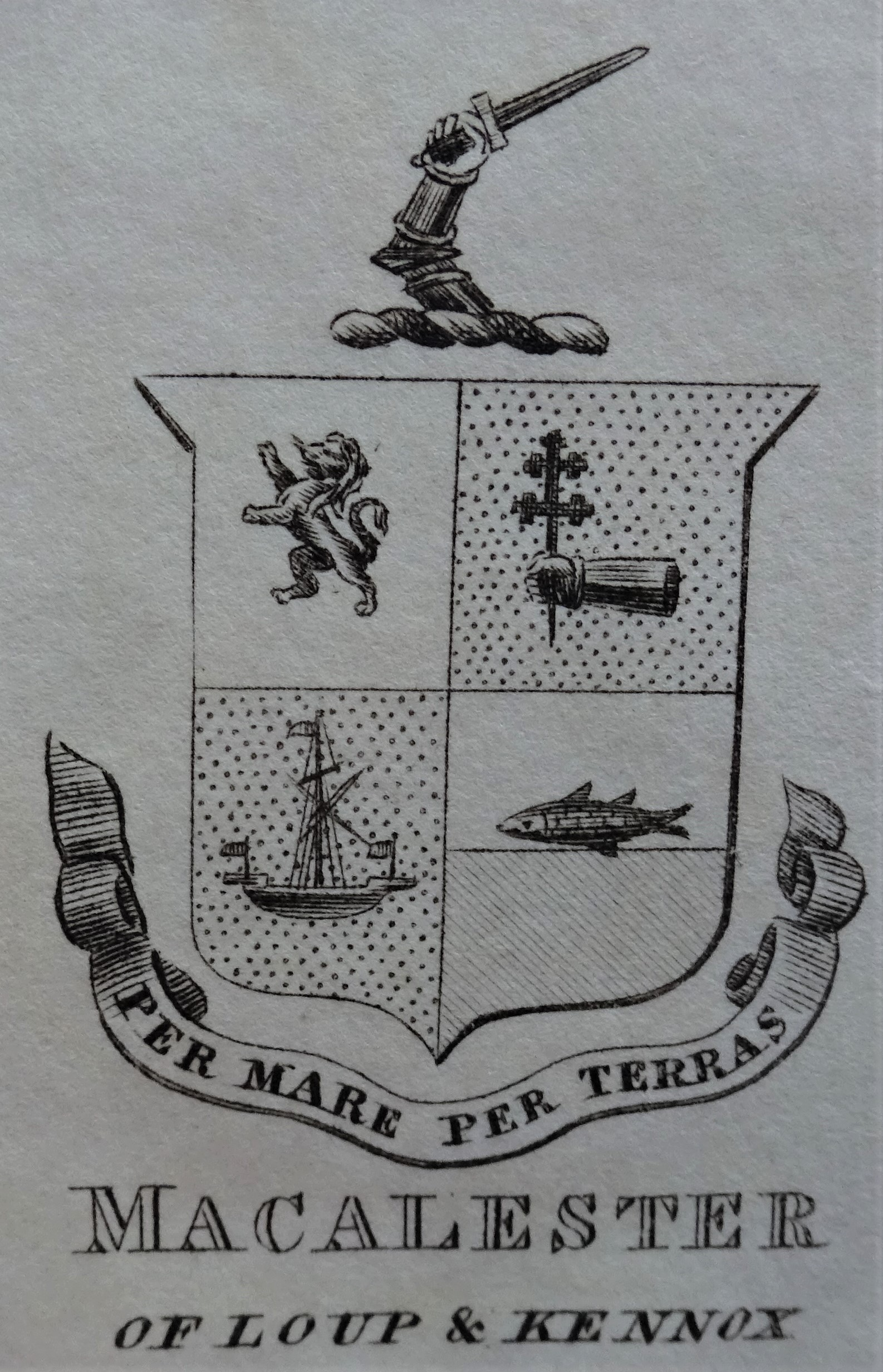
Macalester of Loup and Kennox coat of arms.

Kennox house was originally called Crivoch and a house nearby still retains that name. Sir Neil Montgomery of Lainshaw married Elizabeth Cunninghame of Aiket and one of their sons, John of Cockilbie, had a son named John of Crivoch in the mid-17th century. He may have lived at Crivoch before it was purchased by the Somervilles. The letters of Sir David Cunningham of Auchenharvie to his cousin the laird of Robertland preserved in the National Archives of Scotland detail his efforts to purchase some of these lands (NAS GD237/25/1-4) He sold some of them in turn to James Douglas of Chesters in 1642 (RGS, ix, (1634–1651), no.1189) In 1691 the Hearth Tax records show the Lands of Crivoch with twelve families and the largest dwelling, that of Mistress Miller, possessing four.

Etymology
The name 'Glazert' may come from the Celtic, glas in Gaelic meaning grey or green and dur meaning water.

=== The Somervilles and MacAlisters ===
In around 1700 John Somerville of the Kennox Estate in Lanarkshire purchased the Bollingshaw (now Bonshaw) Barony and built Kennox House (also Kenox in 1832 and Kennoch in 1792) on the lands of Montgomerie - Crevoch. John Somerville married Janet, eldest daughter and heiress of Alexander Montgomerie of Assloss House (previously Aslois, Sloss or Asloace) near Kilmarnock. The family sold Assloss in 1725.

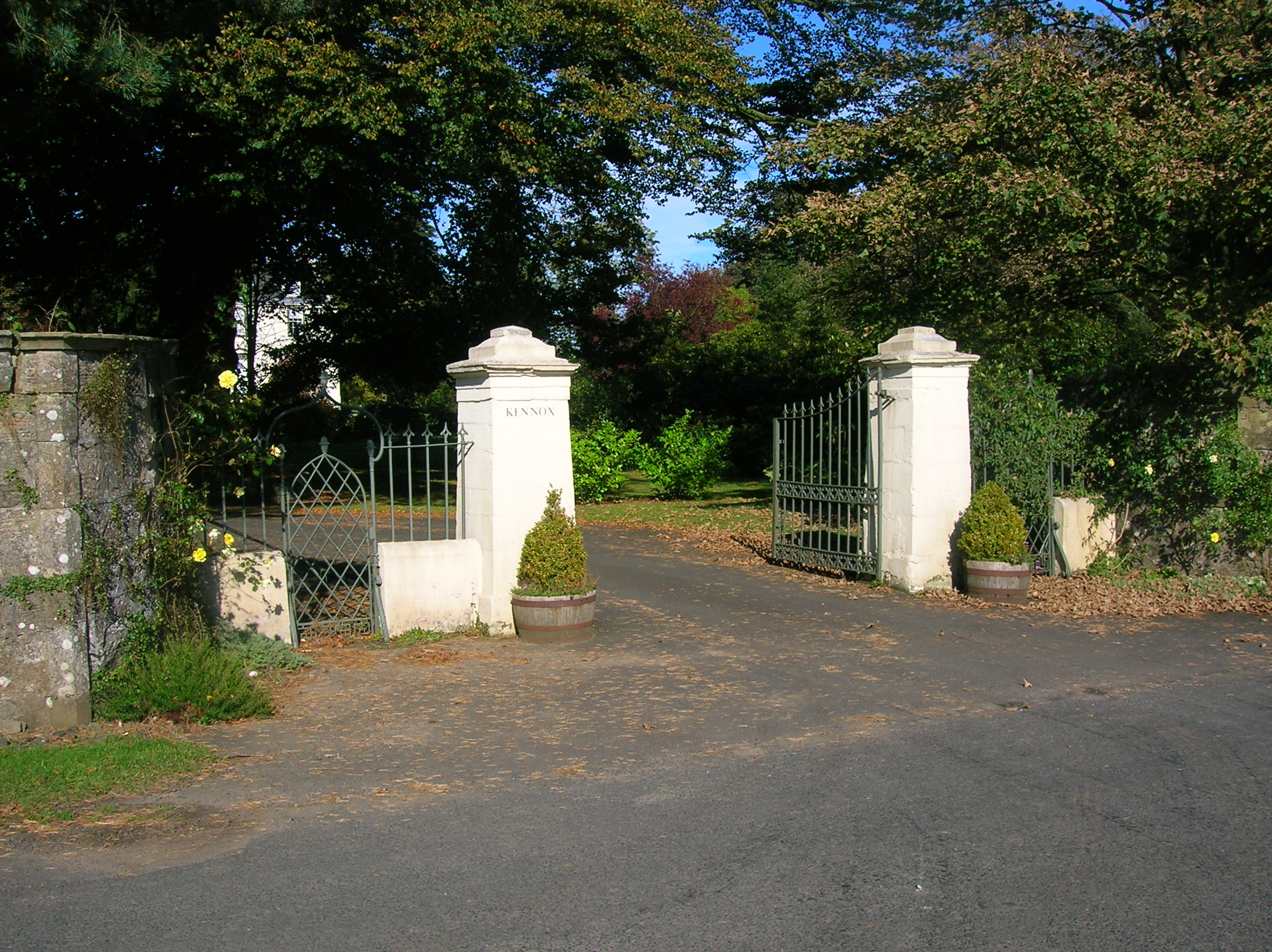
The gates and remains of the old lodges at Kennox House in 2007.

William Somerville succeeded to the Kennox property in 1743 and married Lilias Porterfield of Hapland. A daughter, Janet, married Charles McAlester, 12th of Loup, in 1792, only son of Angus McAlester of Loup, Chief of the Clan MacAlister, who died in 1797. He assumed the name and arms of Somerville along with his own. He died in 1847 and was succeeded by his son, Charles.

Patterson records that the McAlester's were Jacobites and had lost their estates and money after 1745, however this marriage restored their fortunes and, as stated, 'Somerville' has been retained in the patronym and coat of arms. Charles was succeeded by his son, Charles. Charles Somerville McAlester of Loup and Kennox died in 1903 and was succeeded by his son, Charles Godfrey Somerville McAlester of Loup and Kennox.

Colonel Charles McAlester, Laird of Loup and Kennox, became Deputy Lieutenant of Ayrshire, and Commandant of the first regiment of Ayrshire Local Militia. It is recorded that when the regiment was disbanded he kept the banners, instruments and other items at Kennox, saying that "if anyone had a better claim" he would release the items to them.

Captain Charles Somerville McAlester married Williamina P. Pollok - Morris of Craig House. She died aged 27 in 1872 and is buried in Saint Maurs - Glencairn church with her parents and not with her husband. This arrangement is rather unusual and may have been a family tradition judging by the other married daughters buried here with the family. Kennox is not even in the same Parish as Craig House.

Charles Somerville McAlister and Janet had four children. They bequeathed the part of the Barony of Bollingshaw named Chapelton to their younger son James, who never married and died in 1857. Charles the father died in 1847 and his eldest son, also called Charles Somerville McAlester, born in 1828 and married to Mary Brabazon, inherited the Kennox estate. It is recorded by Dobie that the older Charles was an eccentric and was one of the last of the country squires of old in his attitudes and behaviour.

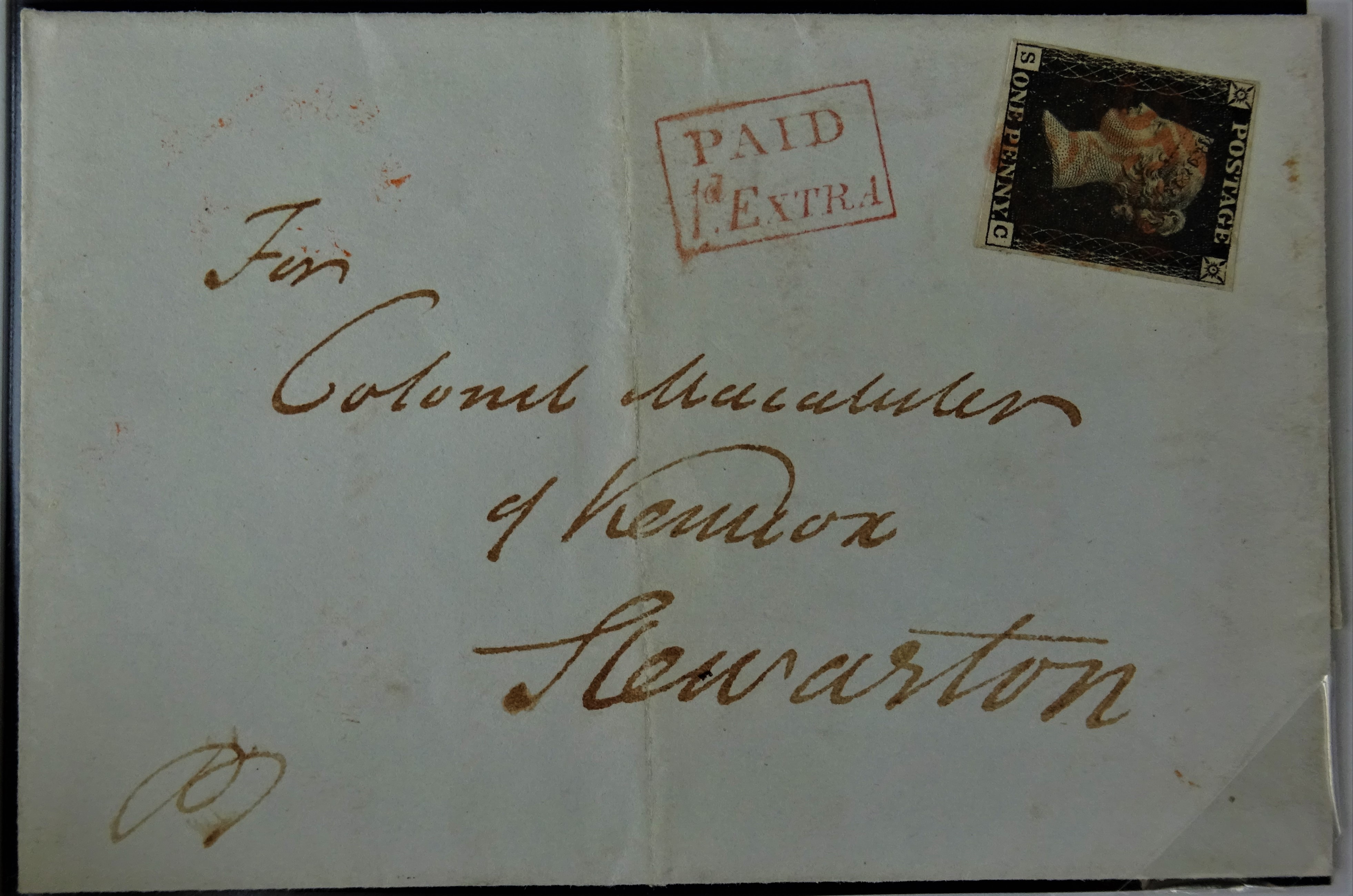
A letter of 1840 written to Colonel Mcallister

The current chief of the clan is William St John Somerville McAlester of Loup and Kennox who lives in England. The current chief is a member of The Standing Council of Scottish Chiefs. Today (2010) there is a clan centre located at Glenbarr Abbey.

=== Kennox estate ===
The estate consisted of the lands of Crevoch - Lindsay, Crevoch - Montgomerie, part of the lands of Bonshaw and the lands of Fairlie - Crevoch, including the chapel lands and the glebe. These chapel lands would have been held in mortmain until after the reformation. The old cottage beyond the site of the old mill was known as Crevoch and a building of that name is placed in this area in Timothy Pont's map of 1604. Fairlie - Crevoch is situated near Cunninghamhead and a Fairlie - Crevoch Mill existed on the Annick Water near Ramstane (1860 OS), however this had been known as Scroaggy or Scroaggie Mill until after the 'Kennox' Crevoch mill fell into disuse.

James Somerville obtained Chapelton, however we know from Dobie that James McAlister, nephew of the aforementioned James, was the owner in 1874. This James McAlister, the nephew of James Somerville, also never married. Chapelton had been re-acquired into the Bollingshaw Barony for him by his father, Charles McAlister.

== Micro history ==
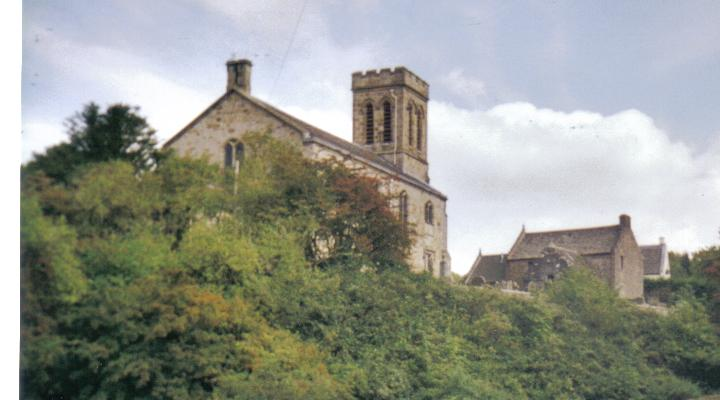
A view of Dunlop Church and Clandeboye Hall in 2006.

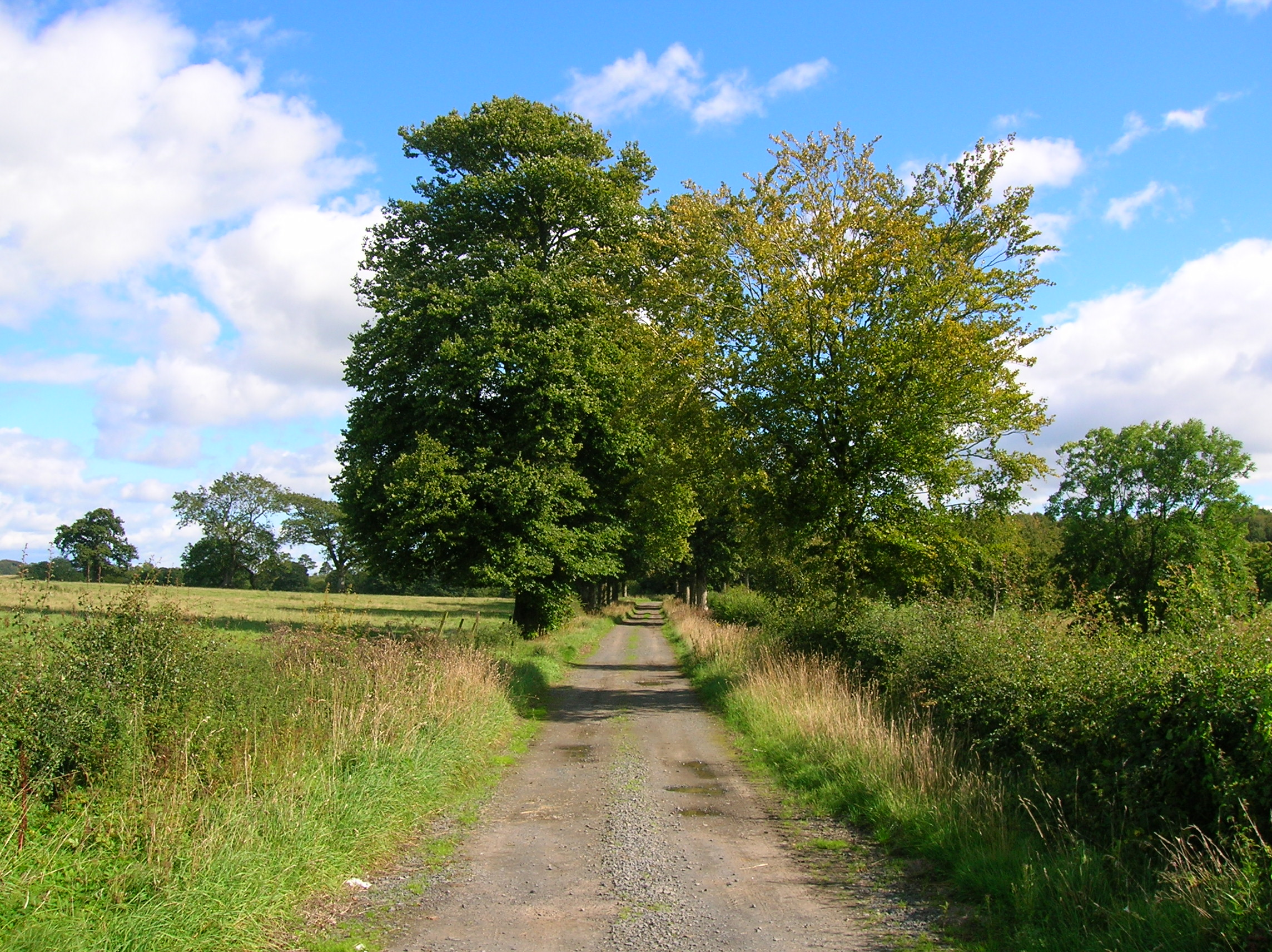
The old entrance to the stables and house from near Gallowayford.

Major McAlester of Kennox, then a heritor of Dunlop church, obtained the 1792 bell and Miss McAlester and Mr.Charles G. S. McAlester returned it to the Kirk Session in 1935 to honour the centenary of the present church.

Charles Somerville MacAllister was one of the stewards at the great banquet held after the Eglinton Tournament.

Colonel and Mrs MacAllister attended the famous 1839 Eglinton Tournament in what is now Eglinton Country Park and were allotted a seat in the Grand Stand.

The Glazert burn, previously Glazart has otters and the rare freshwater mussel (source of freshwater pearls) as witnessed by broken shells found scattered on the river bank.

=== The Kilmarnock Glenfield Ramblers ===
Over many years this society paid several visits to Kennox and on one visit in 1930 they were told by McAlister, the Laird of Loup and Kennox, that the nearby name Gallowayford is derived from the Gallows which permanently stood beside the ford on the Glazert. It was also noted that an ancient Yew tree grew in the grounds which challenged the Loudoun Castle yew in size and antiquity. A very fine specimen of a Hornbeam was also noted.

== The Kennox estate saw pit ==
Kennox possesses one of the few surviving, although long unused, Saw pits, clearly marked on the first edition of the OS map. These pits were used for cutting local timber into planks, stobs and other forms of timber for fencing, building, etc. The site is next to the Glazert Water (Glassard in 1779) which runs through the estate. An early OS map shows a track running from the saw pit up across the leat and towards the entrance to Bickethall.

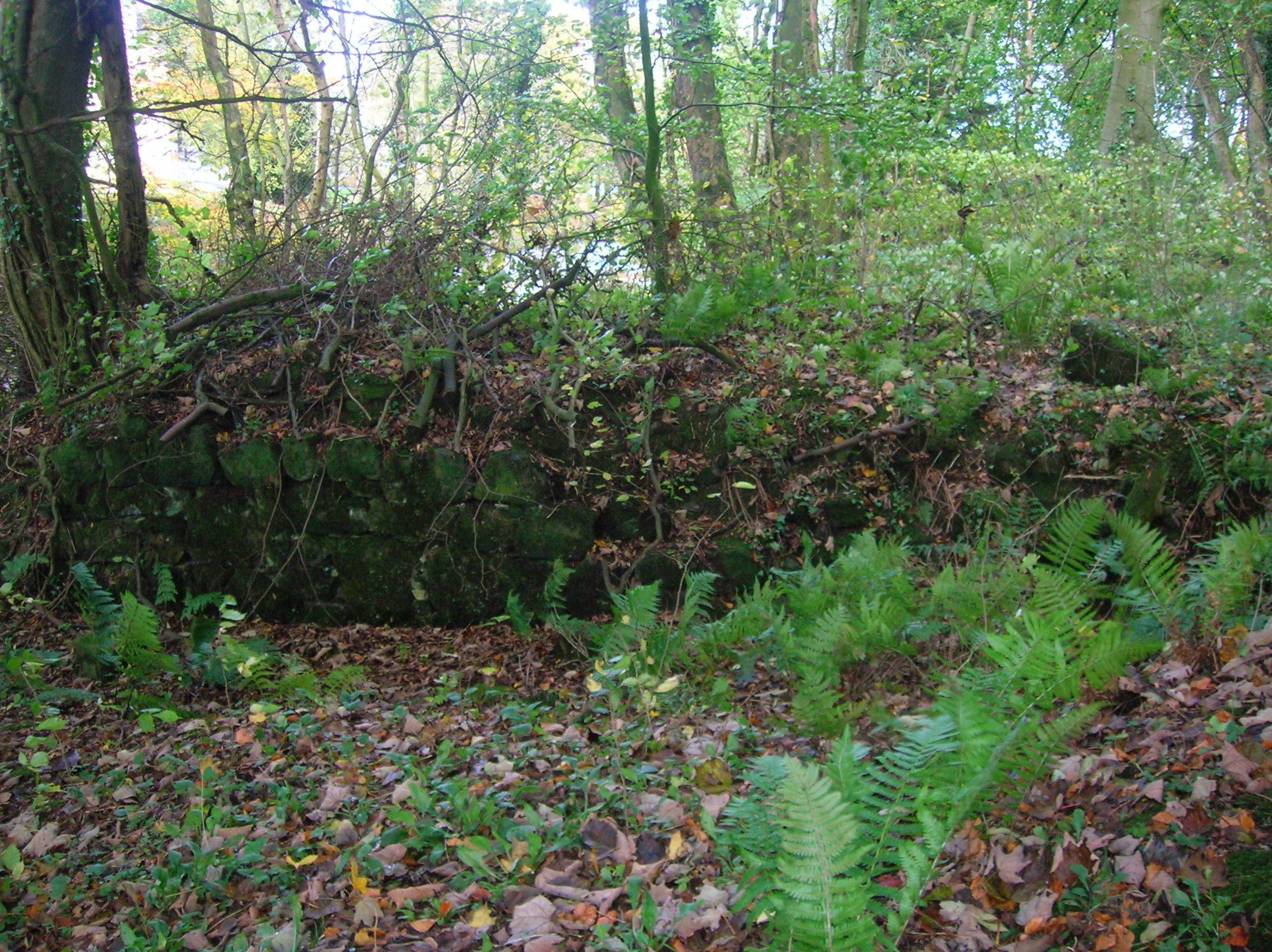
The main surviving retaining wall of the pit with the collapsed wall in the foreground.

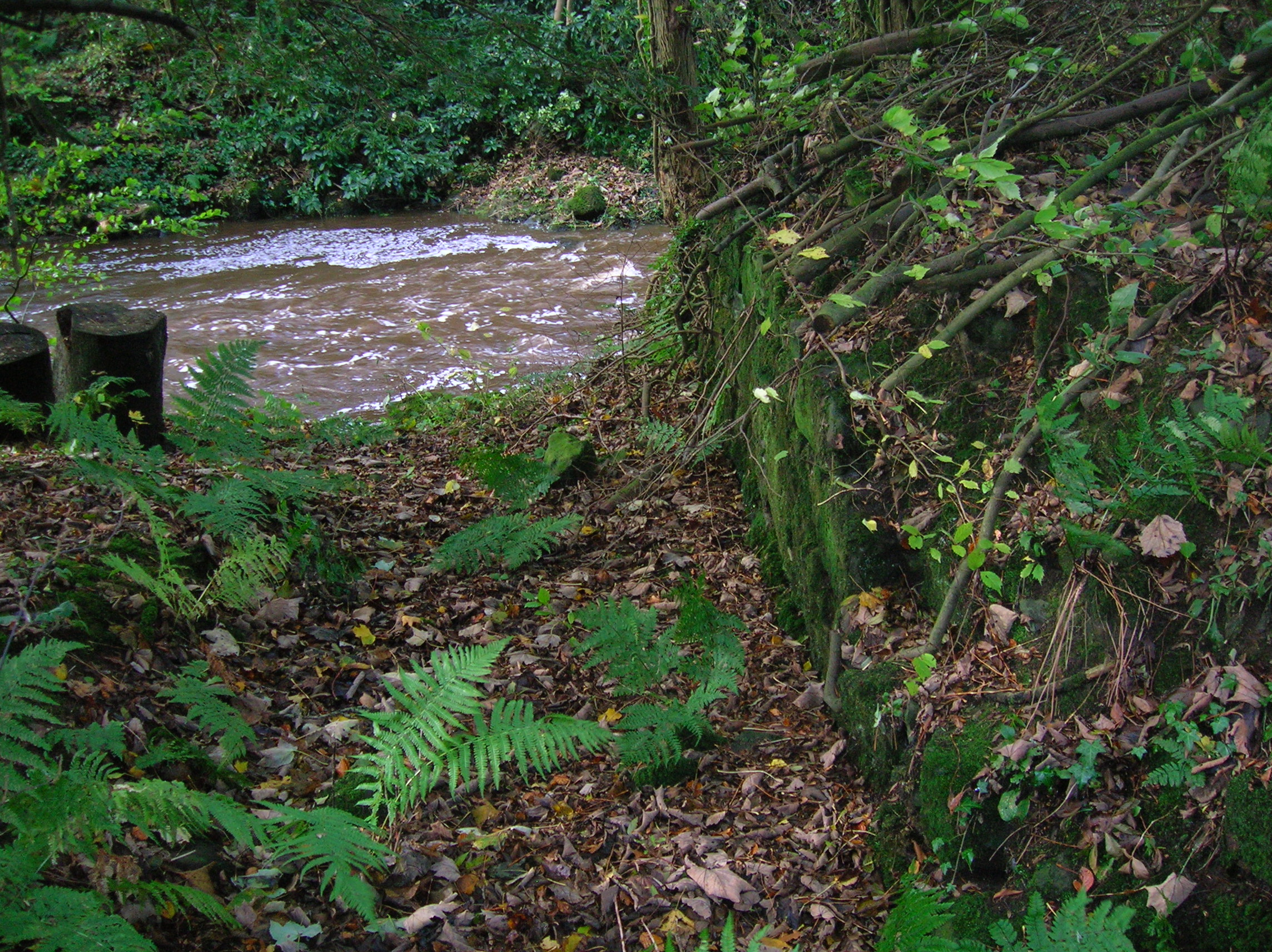
Looking along the pit towards the Glazert Water.

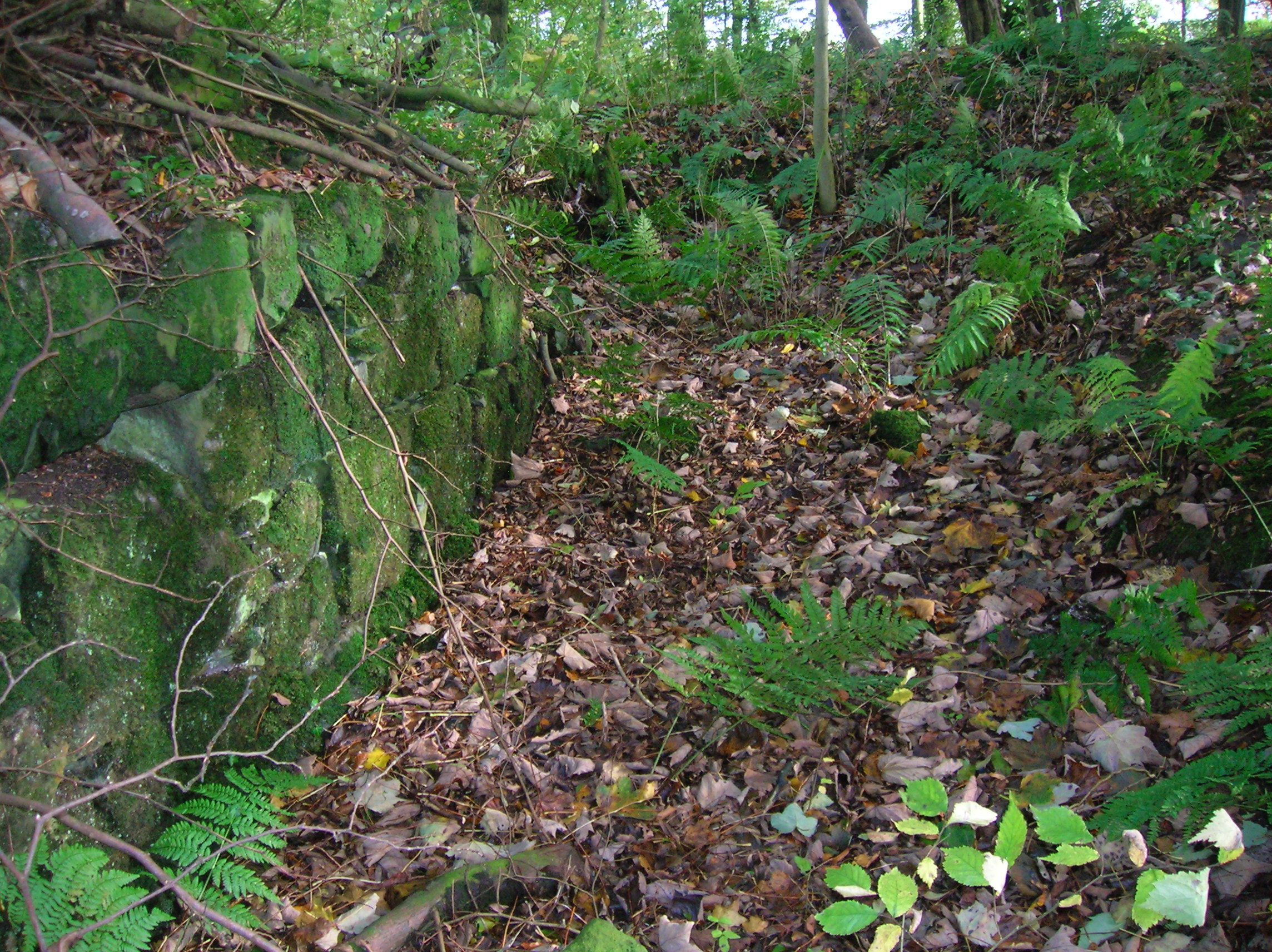
Looking up the pit towards the 'closed off' end.

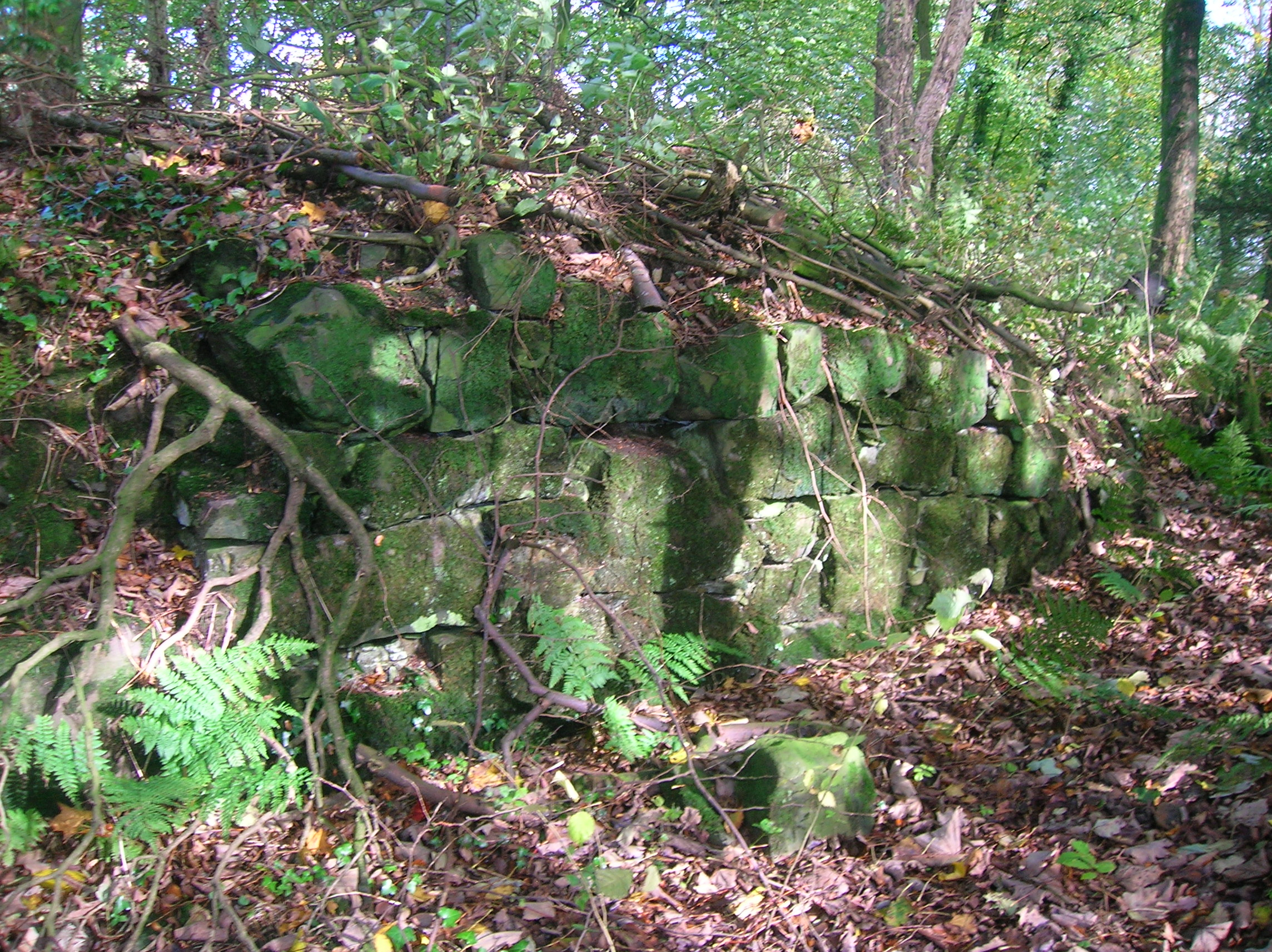
Detail of the stonework on the surviving retaining wall.

== See also ==
- Chapeltoun
- Corsehill
