= Garmoran =

Area of Highland, Scotland

Coordinates: 56°45′N 5°47′W

Garmoran is an area of western Scotland. It lies at the south-western edge of the present Highland Region. It includes Knoydart, Morar, Moidart, Ardnamurchan, and the Small Isles.

== History ==
The medieval lordship of Garmoran was ruled by the MacRuaris, descendants of Somerled, and later formed part of the Lordship of the Isles. Castle Tioram, at the entrance to Loch Moidart, was one of the residences of the lords of Garmoran.

In 1284 when his son the prince died, Alexander III called Ailin mac Ruaidhri, the ruler of Garmoran, (along with all the Earls and Barons of Scotland) to make them accept Margaret, Maid of Norway as the heir. Ailin had died by 1296, by which time he had fathered two illegitimate sons, Ruaidhri and Lachlan, and Christina, his sole legitimate heir. However, when Christina succeeded to the extensive estates of her father she resigned a large proportion of them to Ruaidhri.

In 1343, King David II issued a charter to Raghnall Mac Ruaidhrí, granting him the islands of Uist, Barra, Eigg and Rhum (Ywest ... Barra ... Egghe ... Romme) and eight pennylands of Garmoran (Garw Morwarne), which were defined as 'Moidart (Mudeworth), Morar (Mordhowor), Arisaig (Aresaig) and Knoydart (Cundeworth) with their pertinents'.

In October 1346, Raghnall Mac Ruaidhrí was assassinated at Elcho Nunnery near Perth as the result of a quarrel with Uilleam III, Earl of Ross. Raghnall was the "last chieftain of the MacRuaris" and Amie mac Ruari, who married John of Islay, Lord of the Isles, was his sole heir. John of Islay later divorced her although the "unvarying tradition" of the Gàidhealtachd recorded in the late 19th century was that Amie had given her husband no grounds for doing so and lived on her own on her estates until her death. The divorce annulled John of Islay's rights to her lands, although he managed to procure a royal charter to them in which her name is not even mentioned. Their son Ranald successfully petitioned for the return of much of the Macruairi lands including Garmoran. He became the progenitor of Clan Macdonald of Clanranald and Clan MacDonell of Glengarry.
