= Raghnall Mac Ruaidhrí =

Scottish magnate (died 1346)

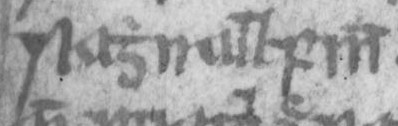
- Raghnall's name as it appears on folio 1v of National Library of Scotland Advocates' 72.1.1 (MS 1467): "Raghnall finn".
- Predecessor: Ruaidhrí Mac Ruaidhrí
- Successor: Áine Nic Ruaidhrí
- Died: October 1346; Elcho Priory
- Noble family: Clann Ruaidhrí
- Father: Ruaidhrí Mac Ruaidhrí

Raghnall Mac Ruaidhrí (died October 1346) was an eminent Scottish magnate and chief of Clann Ruaidhrí. (Note: Since the 1980s, academics have accorded Raghnall various patronyms in English secondary sources: Raghnall Mac Ruaidhrí, Raghnall Mac Ruaidhri, Raghnall MacRuaidhrí, Ranald mac Ruairidh, Ranald Macruairi, Ranald MacRuairi, Ranald MacRuairidh, Ranald MacRuari, Ranald macRuari, Ranald MacRuaridh, Ranald Macruaridh, Ranald MacRuarie, Reginald MacRuairidh, and Reginald MacRuari.) Raghnall's father, Ruaidhrí Mac Ruaidhrí, appears to have been slain in 1318, at a time when Raghnall may have been under age. Ruaidhrí himself appears to have faced resistance over the Clann Ruaidhrí lordship from his sister, Cairistíona, wife of Donnchadh, a member of the comital family of Mar. Following Ruaidhrí's demise, there is evidence indicating that Cairistíona and her powerful confederates also posed a threat to the young Raghnall. Nevertheless, Raghnall eventually succeeded to his father, and first appears on record in 1337.

Raghnall's possession of his family's expansive ancestral territories in the Hebrides and West Highlands put him in conflict with the neighbouring magnate William III, Earl of Ross, and contention between the two probably contributed to Raghnall's assassination at the hands of the earl's adherents in 1346. Following his death, the Clann Ruaidhrí territories passed through his sister, Áine, into the possession of her husband, the chief of Clann Domhnaill, Eóin Mac Domhnaill I, Lord of the Isles, resulting in the latter's consolidation of power in the Hebrides as Lord of the Isles.

== Clann Ruaidhrí ==
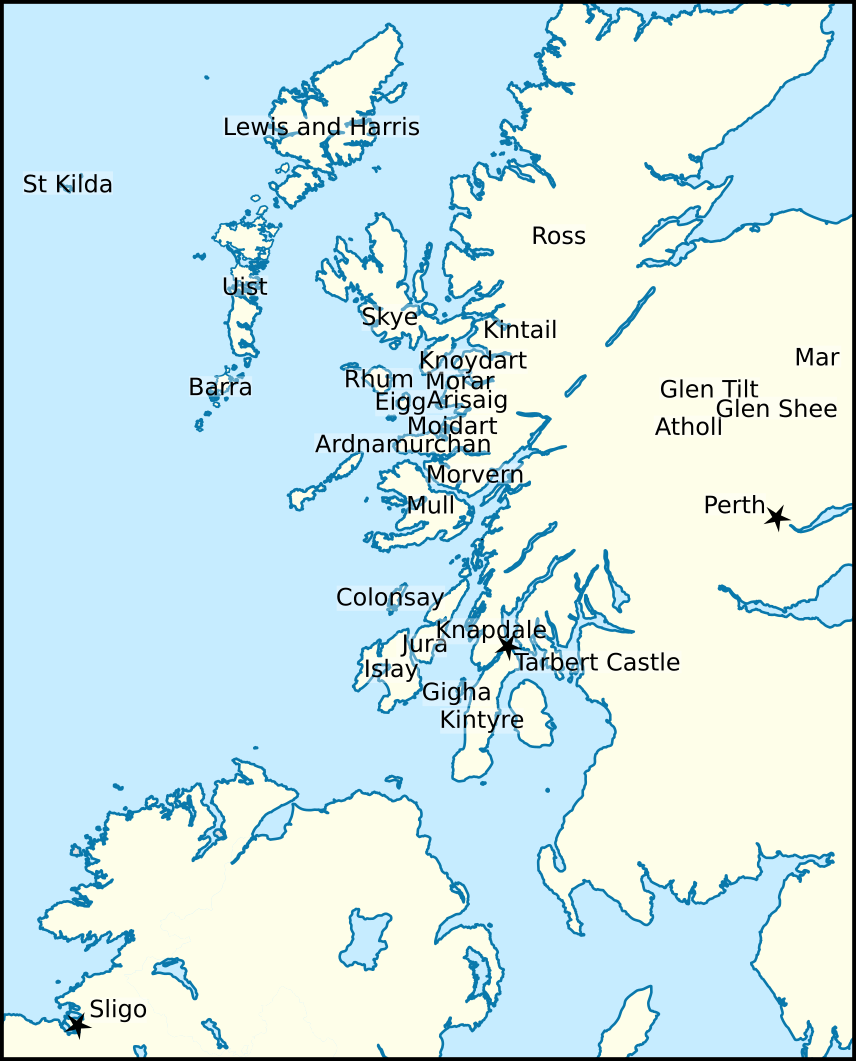
Locations relating to the life and times of Raghnall.

The fifteenth-century National Library of Scotland Advocates' 72.1.1 (MS 1467) accords Raghnall with an epithet meaning "white". He was an illegitimate son of Ruaidhrí Mac Ruaidhrí, grandson of the eponymous ancestor of Clann Ruaidhrí. The identity of Raghnall's mother is unknown. Raghnall's father controlled a provincial lordship which encompassed the mainland territories of Moidart, Arisaig, Morar, and Knoydart; and the island territories of Rhum, Eigg, Barra, St Kilda, and Uist. This dominion, like the great lordships of Annandale and Galloway, was comparable to the kingdom's thirteen earldoms. There is reason to suspect that the rights to the family's territories were contested after Ruaidhrí's death. In fact, Ruaidhrí himself was illegitimate, and only gained formal control of the lordship after his legitimate half-sister, Cairistíona, resigned her rights to him at some point during the reign of Robert I, King of Scotland. (Note: Cairistíona's claims to the Clann Ruaidhrí inheritance apparently posed a potential threat to Ruaidhrí and Raghnall. For example, Cairistíona was the wife of Donnchadh, the member of the comital kindred of Mar. This family was closely related to the Bruce kindred: Robert I's first wife, Iseabail, was a daughter of Domhnall I, Earl of Mar; and a sister of Robert I was married to Domhnall I's son and successor, Gartnait. The parentage of Cairistíona's husband is uncertain. One possibility is that she was a younger son of Uilleam, Earl of Mar. Another possibility is that Donnchadh was instead a son of Uilleam's son, Domhnall I. In any case, Cairistíona had a son, Ruaidhrí, who potentially could have sought royal assistance in pursuance of his mother's claims. The fact that the latter had been bestowed the name Ruaidhrí could indicate that he was not only named after his maternal grandfather, but that he was regarded as a potential successor to the Clann Ruaidhrí lordship. Certainly, Cairistíona resigned her claims with the condition that, if her brother died without a male heir, and her like-named son married one of her brother's daughters, Cairistíona's son would secure the inheritance.)

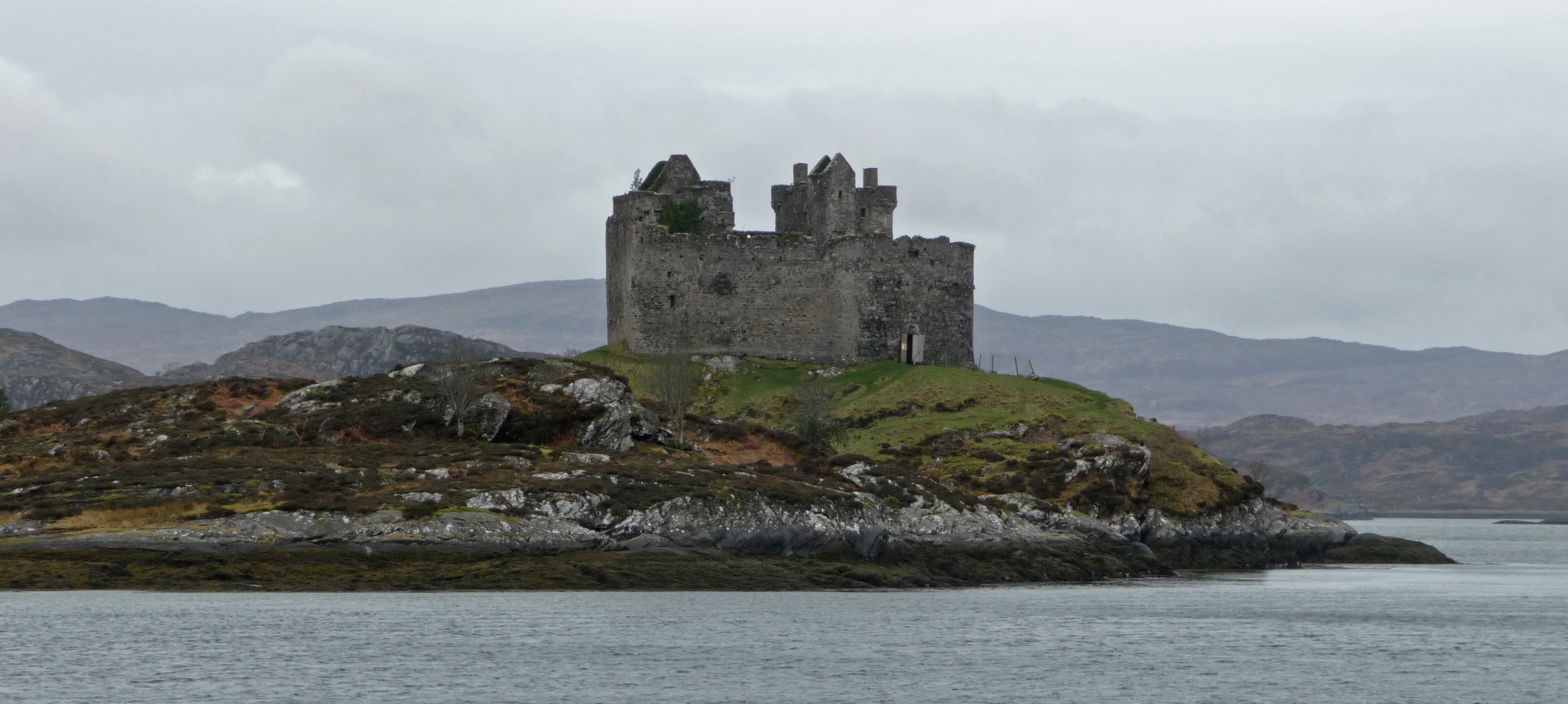
Now-ruinous Castle Tioram may have once been a principal stronghold of Clann Ruaidhrí. (Note: The island the fortress sits upon is first recorded in a charter of Raghnall's aunt, Cairistíona. The castle itself is first recorded in a later charter of Eóin Mac Domhnaill I, Lord of the Isles to his son, Raghnall Mac Domhnaill. The latter's mother was Áine Nic Ruaidhrí, Raghnall's sister. The fact the island is mentioned in Cairistíona's charter could be evidence of the castle's existence at the time. Even if it had not been constructed by this date, the island must have been significant enough to be worthy of mention alongside other Clann Ruaidhrí territories. The seventeenth-century Sleat History states that the castle was constructed by Áine. Certainly, Castle Tioram served as the seat of Áine's Clann Raghnaill descendants for centuries.)

Raghnall's father appears to be identical to the Clann Ruaidhrí dynast—styled "King of the Hebrides"—who lost his life in the service of the Bruce campaign in Ireland in 1318. At the time, Raghnall may well have been under age, and it is apparent that Cairistíona and her confederates again attempted to seize control of the inheritance. Although she is recorded to have resigned her claimed rights to a certain Artúr Caimbéal at some point after Ruaidhrí's death, it is clear that Raghnall succeeded in securing the region, and was regarded as the chief of Clann Ruaidhrí by most of his kin. (Note: One possibility is that the scheme between Cairistíona and Artúr had been undertaken in the context of a marital alliance between her and the latter's family, the Caimbéalaigh (the Campbells). Robert I is known to have granted the constableship of the former Clann Dubhghaill stronghold of Dunstaffnage Castle to a certain Artúr Caimbéal. The identity of this constable is uncertain, however, as there was a father and son who bore this name. Whilst the constableship may have been awarded to the senior-most Artúr, Cairistíona's transaction appears to have involved his son, and it is possible that the latter was intended to marry her. Whatever the case, the elder Artúr seems to be the founding ancestor of the Strachur branch of the Caimbéalaigh.)

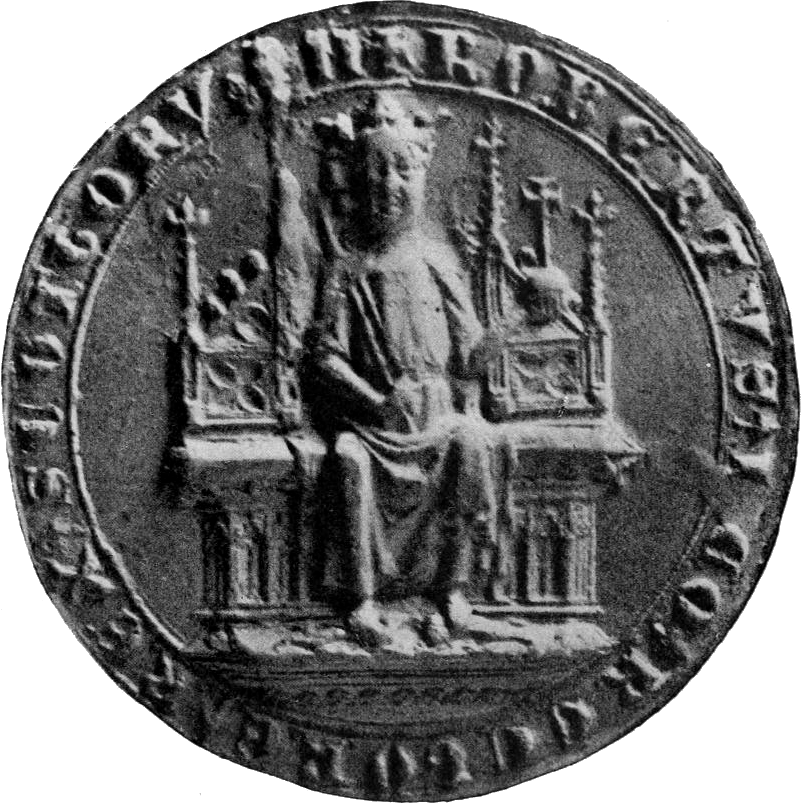
The seal of Robert I, an embattled monarch who partly owed his survival to efforts of Raghnall's aunt, Cairistíona Nic Ruaidhrí. The king may have forfeited Raghnall in 1325 after Cairistíona attempted to deny Raghnall his inheritance.

In 1325, a certain "Roderici de Ylay" suffered the forfeiture of his possessions by Robert I. Although this record could refer to a member of Clann Domhnaill, another possibility is that the individual actually refers to a member of Clann Ruaidhrí, and that the record evinces contrasting relations between Clann Ruaidhrí and the Scottish Crown in the 1320s and 1330s. If this record indeed refers to a member of Clann Ruaidhrí, the man in question may well have been Raghnall himself. If so, the forfeiture could have stemmed from resistance advanced by Raghnall to counter Cairistíona's attempts to alienate the Clann Ruaidhrí estate from him and transfer it into the clutches of the Caimbéalaigh. Alternately, the forfeiture could have been ratified in response to undesirable Clann Ruaidhrí expansion into certain neighbouring regions, such as the former territories of the disinherited Clann Dubhghaill.

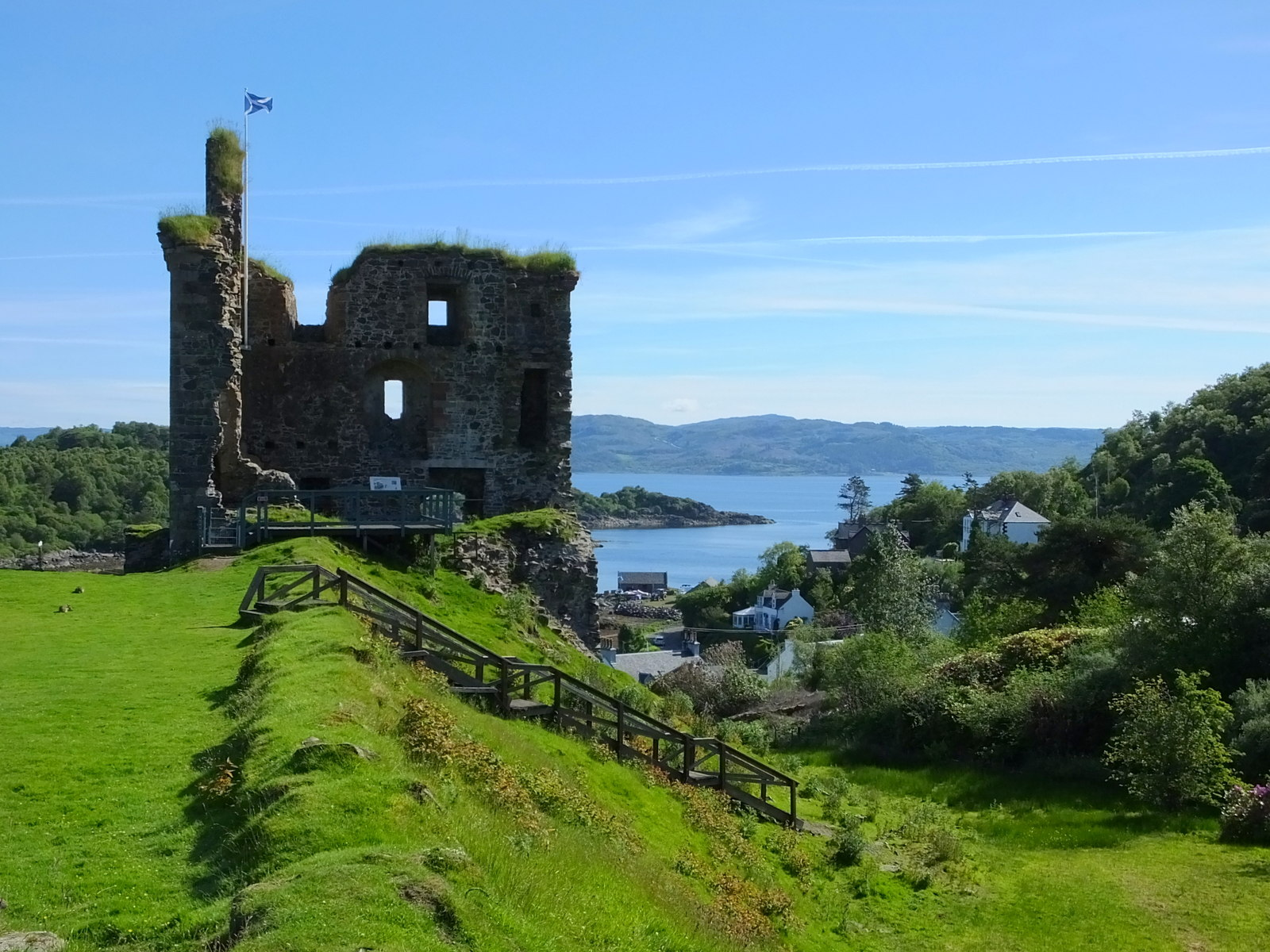
Now-ruinous Tarbert Castle underwent extensive enhancements in 1325–1326, and evidently ranked as one of the most dominant Scottish castles at the time. A royal visit to the castle in 1325 may have concerned the apparent forfetiure of Raghnall in the same year. Much of the castle's visible remains date to work undertaken in the 1320s and about 1500.

Although Cairistíona's resignation charter to Artúr is undated, it could date to just before the forfeiture. The list of witnesses who attested the grant is remarkable, and may reveal that the charter had royal approval. The witnesses include: John Menteith, Domhnall Caimbéal, Alasdair Mac Neachdainn, Eóghan Mac Íomhair, Donnchadh Caimbéal (son of Tomás Caimbéal), Niall Mac Giolla Eáin, and (the latter's brother) Domhnall Mac Giolla Eáin. (Note: John Menteith could be identical to either the father or son who bore the name.) These men all seem to have been close adherents of Robert I against Clann Dubhghaill, and all represented families of power along the western seaboard. An alliance of such men may well have been an intimidating prospect to the Clann Ruaidhrí leadership.

The forfeiture could have been personally reinforced by Robert I, as he seems to have travelled to Tarbert Castle—an imposing royal stronghold in Kintyre—within the same year. (Note: The brothers Niall Mac Giolla Eáin and Domhnall Mac Giolla Eáin, along with another brother, Eóin Mac Giolla Eáin, are associated with the castle at about this time.) There is reason to suspect that the establishment of the Caimbéalaigh constabulary of Dunstaffnage formed part of a plan to create a new western sheriffdom based at Tarbert. Although the king had previously allowed the succession of Raghnall's father in the first decade of the century, it is evident that by the early 1320s the Scottish Crown was allowing and assisting in the expansion of families such as the Caimbéalaigh at the expense of families like Clann Ruaidhrí. In fact, it may have been at the Scone parliament of 1323—perhaps at the same time that work on Tarbert Castle was authorised—that the constabulary was granted to the Caimbéalaigh, along with lands in Benderloch, Ardnastaffnage, Inverawe, and other places in Lorn. This royal grant may well have overturned previous grants of former Clann Dubhghaill possessions to members of Clann Ruaidhrí. (Note: Strife between regional factions may account for the order passed by parliament in 1318 that forbade noblemen to prosecute disputes "arising from the war". Such disputes may have concerned families like Clann Ruaidhrí and Clann Domhnaill against the Stewarts, Menteiths, and the Caimbéalaigh.)

== Career ==
This Raynald menyd wes gretly,
For he wes wycht man and worthy.
And fra men saw this infortown,
Syndry can in thare hartis schwne,
And cald it iẅill forbysnyng,
That in the fyrst off thare steryng
That worthy man suld be slayne swa,
And swa gret rowtis past thaim fra.

— excerpt from the Orygynale Cronykil of Scotland depicting the royal army's consternation at the assassination of Raghnall ("Raynald") by adherents of the William III, Earl of Ross.

Unlike the First War of Scottish Independence, in which Clann Ruaidhrí participated, Raghnall and his family are not known to have taken part in the second war (from 1332–41). In fact, Raghnall certainly appears on record by 1337, when he aided his third cousin, Eóin Mac Domhnaill I, Lord of the Isles, in the latter's efforts to receive a papal dispensation to marry Raghnall's sister, Áine, in 1337. (Note: Early modern tradition preserved by the seventeenth-century Sleat History, claims that Raghnall's sister (described as "Algive", daughter of "Allan, son of Roderick Macdougall") cohabited with Eóin for nine or ten years.) At the time, Raghnall and Eóin were apparently supporters of Edward Balliol, a claimant to the Scottish throne who held power in the realm from 1332 to 1336. By June 1343, however, both Raghnall and Eóin were reconciled with Edward's rival, the reigning son of Robert I, David II, King of Scotland, and Raghnall himself was confirmed in the Clann Ruaidhrí lordship by the king. (Note: Although the expansive Clann Ruaidhrí territories are often regarded as a single "Lordship of Garmoran", this title is a modern construct, and the region of Garmoran was actually just one of several mainland territories ruled by the kindred. In fact, the notice of the king's grant of lands to Raghnall in 1343 preserves the earliest instance of the place name ("Garw Morwarne"). In 1336, Edward granted Eóin a large swathe of territory in Argyll and the Hebrides for undertaking to oppose Edward's enemies. Specifically, the grant included the islands of Colonsay, Gigha, Islay, (half of) Jura, Lewis and Harris, Mull, Skye, and the mainland territories of Ardnamurchan, Kintyre, Knapdale, and Morvern. This allotment, therefore, included regions formerly held by apparent supporters of David II, Clann Dubhghaill and Clann Ruaidhrí. Whatever the case, the subsequent eclipse of the Balliol regime, and the return of David II to the throne, rendered Eóin's extensive grant redundant.)

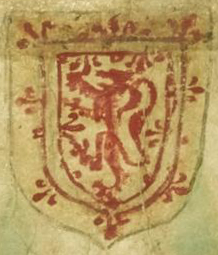
Image a

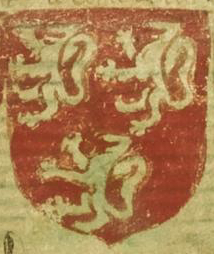
Image b

The arms of Edward Balliol (image a) and the Earl of Ross (image b) depicted in the fourteenth-century Balliol Roll.

At about this time, Raghnall received the rights to Kintail from William III, Earl of Ross, a transaction which was confirmed by the king that July. There is reason to suspect that the king's recognition of this grant may have been intended as a regional counterbalance of sorts, since he also diverted the rights to Skye from Eóin to William III. It is also possible that Clann Ruaidhrí power had expanded into the coastal region of Kintail at some point after the death of William III's father in 1333, during a period when William III may have been either a minor or exiled from the country. Whatever the case, the earl seems to have had little choice but to relinquish his rights to Kintail to Raghnall.

Bitterness between these two magnates appears to be evidenced in dramatic fashion by the assassination of Raghnall and several of his followers at the hands of the earl and his adherents. Raghnall's murder unfolded at Elcho Priory in October 1346, and is attested by numerous sources, such as the fifteenth-century Scotichronicon, the fifteenth-century Orygynale Cronykil of Scotland, the fifteenth-century Liber Pluscardensis, and the seventeenth-century Sleat History. At the time of his demise, Raghnall had been obeying the king's muster at Perth, in preparation for the Scots' imminent invasion of England. Following the deed, William III deserted the royal host, and fled to the safety of his domain. What is known of William III's comital career reveals that it was local, rather than national issues, that laid behind his recorded actions. The murder of Raghnall and the earl's desertion—a flight which likely left his king with a substantially smaller fighting-force—is one such example. David II was captured, only days later, in battle against the English—a fact that may explain how William III was able to escape censure for the slaying. Although William III was later to pay dearly for his disertion, his part in the murder evinces his determination to deal with the threat of encroachment of Clann Ruaidhrí power into what he regarded as his own domain. Despite this dramatic removal of William III's main rival, the most immediate beneficiary of the killing was Eóin, the chief of Clann Domhnaill, a man who was also William III's brother-in-law.

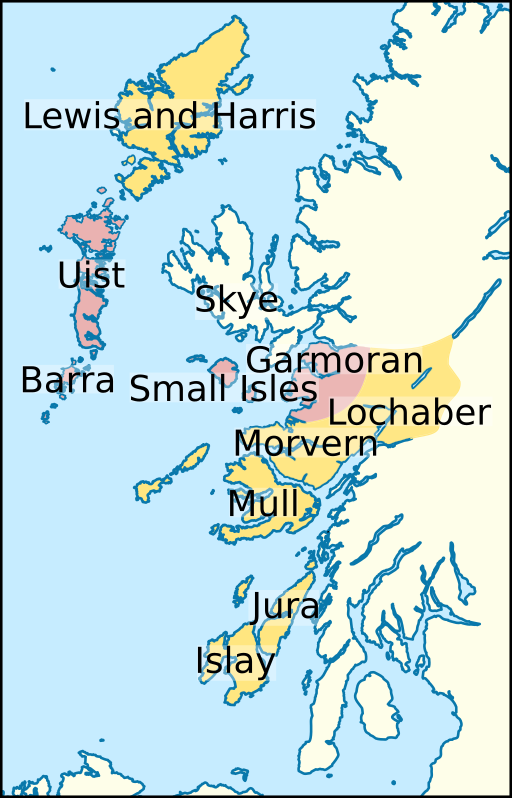
The extent of the Clann Domhnaill Lordship of the Isles in 1343 (yellow). The Clann Ruaidhrí territories (red) were absorbed within this lordship after Raghnall's death in 1346.

Following Raghnall's death, control of the Clann Ruaidhrí estate passed to Eóin by right of his wife. Although Áine appears to have been either dead or divorced from Eóin by 1350, the Clann Ruaidhrí territories evidently remained in Eóin's possession after his subsequent marriage to Margaret, daughter of Robert Stewart, Steward of Scotland. (Note: Negotiations concerning the marriage between Eóin and Margaret may have commenced not long after Raghnall's demise, and could have involved the Steward's recognition of Eóin's continued possession of the Clann Ruaidhrí lands. According to the Sleat History, Eóin abandoned Áine "by the consent of his council and familiar friends".) David himself died in 1371, and was succeeded by his uncle, Robert Stewart (as Robert II). In 1371/1372, the recently crowned king confirmed Eóin's rights to the former Clann Ruaidhrí territories. The following year, Robert II confirmed Eóin's grant of these lands to Raghnall Mac Domhnaill—Eóin and Áine's eldest surviving son—a man apparently named after Raghnall himself. (Note: The grant of the former Clann Ruaidhrí territories to Raghnall Mac Domhnaill may well have been in compensation for his exclusion from the chiefship of Clann Domhnaill, which fell to the eldest son of Eóin and Margaret. Raghnall Mac Domhnaill went on to become the eponymous ancestor of the Clann Raghnaill branch of Clann Domhnaill.)

Raghnall seems to have had a brother, Eóghan, who received a grant to the thanage of Glen Tilt from the Steward. The transaction appears to date to before 1346, at about the time members of Clann Ruaidhrí were operating as gallowglasses in Ireland. This could in turn indicate that the Steward was using the kindred in a military capacity to extend his own power eastwards into Atholl, where he appears to have also made use of connections with Clann Donnchaidh. (Note: The Steward's charter to Eóghan identifies him as a brother of Raghnall "of the Isles". Although it is possible that this Eóghan represents yet another son of Eóin, and that this Raghnall represents Raghnall Mac Domhnaill, the fact that the latter was probably only a teenager at the time, coupled with the fact Eóghan is not described as a son of Eóin, suggests that the charter does not concern Clann Domhnaill at all. Certainly, leading members of Clann Ruaidhrí are known to have styled themselves de Insulis. A particular Gaelic ballad concerning the legendary Diarmaid Ó Duibhne may further cast light on Clann Ruaidhrí following Raghnall's death. The poem itself appears to have been composed around Glen Shee in about 1400 by a certain Ailéan Mac Ruaidhrí, a man who could have been a descendant of Eóghan. The Irish version of the poem is centred in Sligo, a region where Clann Ruaidhrí gallowglasses are known to have settled in the fourteenth century.) If certain fifteenth-century pedigrees are two be believed, Raghnall had at least one illegitimate son, and his descendants continued to act as leaders of Clann Ruaidhrí. (Note: The fact that Clann Ruaidhrí continued on into later centuries is evidenced by the fifteenth-century executions of Alasdair Mac Ruaidhrí and Eóin Mac Artair, chieftains said to have commanded one thousand men apiece. These two may have been continuing a feud that stemmed from Cairistíona's contested inheritance and connections with the Caimbéalaigh.)

== Ancestry ==
Ancestors of Raghnall Mac Ruaidhrí

16. Raghnall mac Somhairle (died 1191/1192 – c.1210/1227)
8. Ruaidhrí mac Raghnaill (died 1247?)
4. Ailéan mac Ruaidhrí (died ×1296)
2. Ruaidhrí Mac Ruaidhrí (died 1318?)
1. Raghnall Mac Ruaidhrí (died 1346)
