= Loch Shiel =

Freshwater loch in Scotland

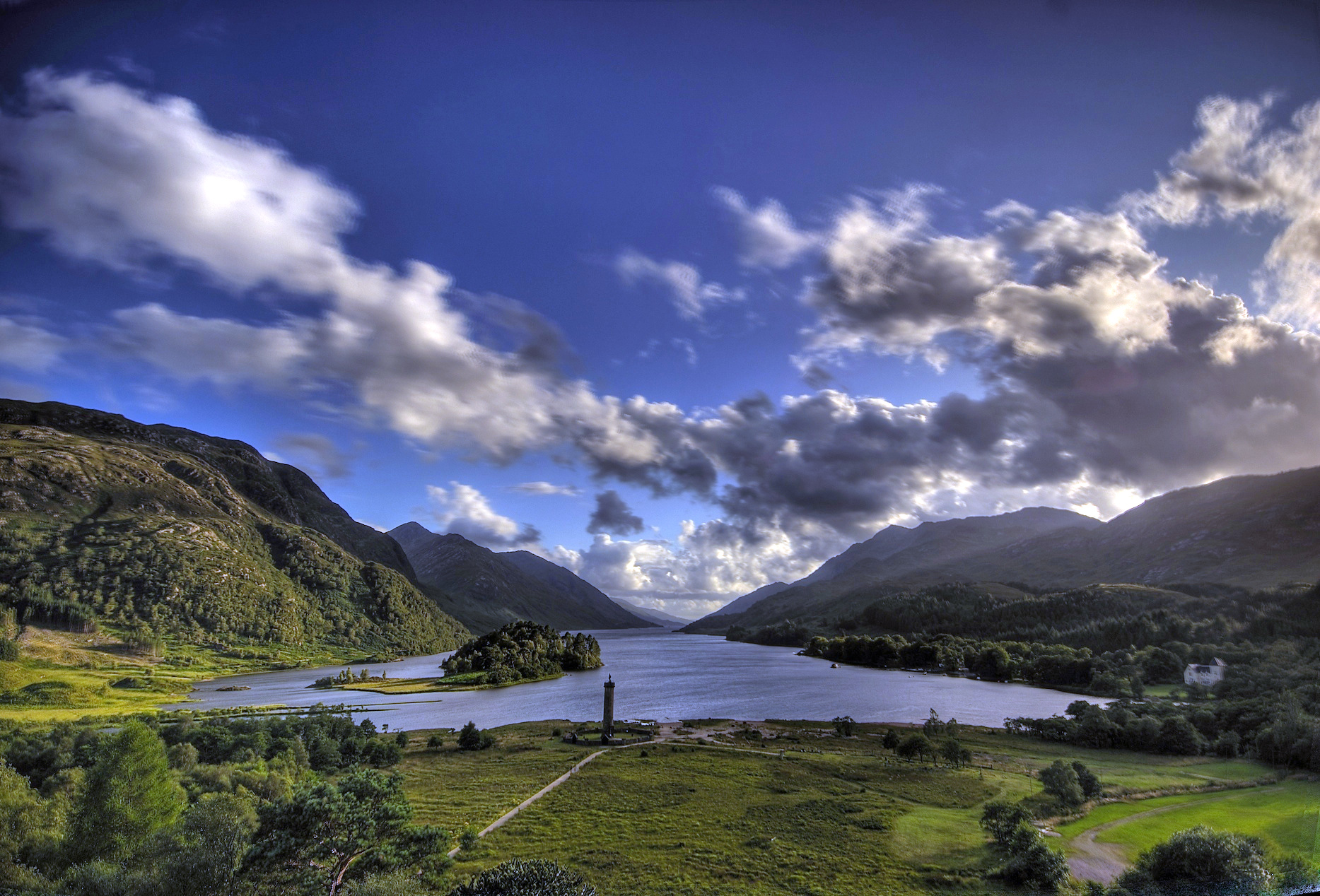
- Loch Shiel and Glenfinnan monument

- Location within Highland
- Location: NM79737179
- Coordinates: 56.785556°N 5.586667°W
- Type: freshwater loch
- Primary inflows: River Finnan, Callop River, River Polloch
- Primary outflows: River Shiel
- Max. length: 28.16352 km (17.50000 mi)
- Max. width: 1.6 km (0.99 mi)
- Surface area: 1,993 ha (4,920 acres)
- Average depth: 132.8 ft (40.5 m)
- Max. depth: 419.948 ft (128.000 m)
- Water volume: 28,502,786,367.04 ft^{3} (807,109,029.000 m^{3})
- Residence time: 1.37 year
- Shore length^{1}: 76 km (47 mi)
- Surface elevation: 4 m (13 ft)
- Settlements: Glenfinnan, Ardshealach, Acharacle
- ^{1} Shore length is not a well-defined measure.

See Glen Shiel for the much smaller Loch Shiel in Lochalsh.

Loch Shiel (Scottish Gaelic: Loch Seile) is a deep freshwater loch situated 20 kilometres (12 mi) west of Fort William in Lochaber, Scotland. At 28 kilometres (17 1/2 mi) long it is the 4th longest loch in Scotland, and is the longest to have retained a natural outflow without any regulation of its water level, being 120 m (393 ft) deep. Its nature changes considerably along its length, being deep and enclosed by mountains in the north east and shallow surrounded by bog and rough pasture in the south west, from which end the 4 km River Shiel drains to the sea in Loch Moidart near Castle Tioram.

The surrounding highlands are picturesque but relatively rarely climbed as none quite reaches the 3,000 ft (910 m) required for Munro status. A number of the hills are classified as Corbetts, including Beinn Resipol, Sgùrr Ghiubhsachain and Sgorr Craobh a' Chaorainn on the southern side of the loch; and Beinn Odhar Bheag on the northern side. The area is well wooded compared to the many Highland areas that have suffered from overgrazing. The view of the loch looking south from the Glenfinnan monument, showing wooded hillsides with bare summits rising steeply from a fjord-like loch, has become one of the most famous images of the Scottish Highlands.

Loch Shiel is less than 10 metres above sea level, and was formed at the end of the last ice age when glacial deposits blocked what was formerly a sea loch.

== Nature and conservation ==
Loch Shiel National Scenic Area
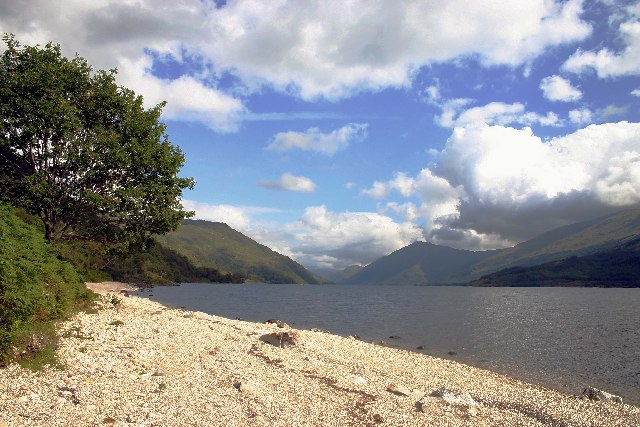
- Looking north east along the loch.
- Interactive map of Loch Shiel National Scenic Area
- Location: Highland, Scotland
- Area: 130 square kilometres (50 sq mi)
- Established: 1981
- Governing body: NatureScot

Loch Shiel is a Special Protection Area (SPA) due to its importance for breeding black-throated divers, and the area surrounding the loch is also designated as an SPA due to the presence of breeding golden eagles. Other bird species living around the loch include white-tailed sea eagles, red-throated divers, peregrine falcons, Eurasian sparrowhawks, common kestrels, ospreys and hen harrier. Several species of duck are also present, including little grebes, goosanders, red-breasted mergansers, mallards, goldeneyes and tufted ducks. Fish in the loch include salmon, sea trout and brown trout. Fishing rights are controlled by the Lochaber Fisheries Trust, who issue permits for fishing from Acharacle at the south west end of the loch.

There are areas of remnant Caledonian Forest on the islands of the loch such as Eilean Camas and Eilean Ghleann Fhoinainn, as well as at Meall na h-Airigh at the northern end of the loch. There are also areas of oak and alder woodlands (see Celtic rain forest) on the shoreline of the loch which are designated as a Special Area of Conservation by NatureScot, who noted that overgrazing and invasive species were threats to the area. The shoreline of the loch is also home to a population of otters.

Claish Moss, to the south of the loch, is one of the best examples of a raised bog in Britain. The bog has developed over the past 8,000 years, with pollen grains preserved by the peat forming a record of the bog's plant life since the bog first began to form. The bog is designated as an SAC, and was also formerly a national nature reserve, but was de-designated in 2011 due to poor access for visitors.

The loch gives its name to Loch Shiel National Scenic Area, one of 40 such areas in Scotland, which are defined so as to identify areas of exceptional scenery and to ensure its protection via the planning system by the restriction of certain forms of development. The Loch Shiel NSA covers 13,045 ha, and extends to the summits of the hills on either side of the loch, as well as the hills surrounding Glen Hurich and the monument at Glenfinnan.

== History ==
A ruined medieval chapel found on the largest island, Eilean Fhianain, is dedicated to St. Finan, and may stand on the site of a cell thought to have been built on the island by the saint in the seventh century. The chapel is thought to have been built by Alan MacRuaridh, a chief of Clan Ranald; the clan used the island as a burial place until the end of the sixteenth century. The island continues to be used for burials, and is a Scheduled Ancient Monument.

Acharacle, at the south of the Loch, is the site of the 1140 battle in which Somerled defeated the Norse to found the ruling dynasty of Lord of the Isles. During these times, the loch had strategic importance as a communications route through the mountains, as the short River Shiel was easily navigable in ancient times, however is no longer navigable as the depth drops to less than a foot. In the medieval period the loch formed the boundary between the provinces or lordships of Moidart to the west, Ardgour to the east, and Sunart in the south.

Castle Tioram on the tidal island Eilean Tioram in Loch Moidart, is located so as to control access to Loch Shiel, and thus to Lochaber and the Great Glen, from the sea. The castle appears to have originally been a principal stronghold of Clann Ruaidhrí. According to early modern tradition, preserved by the seventeenth-century Sleat History, the castle was erected by Áine Nic Ruaidhrí (fl. 1318–50), and certainly served as the seat of the latter's Clann Raghnaill descendants for centuries.

Alasdair mac Mhaighstir Alasdair, the poet and Scottish Gaelic tutor of Bonnie Prince Charlie, was born and raised in the area. At the start of the Jacobite rising of 1745, the prince disembarked at Loch nan Uamh and was rowed the length of Loch Shiel in order to raise his standard at Glenfinnan. After the defeat of the rising at Culloden a number of prominent Jacobites, including Cameron of Lochiel, hid on the small island of Eilean Mhic Dhomnuill Dhuibh in Loch Shiel.

In 1842, during the Highland Clearances when tenants were cleared off the land to make way for sheep farming, the women of Loch Shiel apparently drove off the eviction party. The women were apparently armed with shearing hooks and aprons filled with stones.

== Transport ==
Prior to the construction of the A861 road the loch served as a main transport route in the area, linking the communities at the south end of the loch to the West Highland railway line at Glenfinnan. The regular service carrying mail and passengers was operated by David MacBrayne's between 1953 and 1967, ceasing with the construction of the new road between Lochailort and Kinlochmoidart. The West Highland railway line and the A830 road both pass the northern end of the Loch Shiel at Glenfinnan, while the A861 road also runs close to the lochside for about 4 km at the southern end. There are no public roads that run the full length of the loch: a forestry track runs along the southern side between Polloch and Glenfinnan, while no tracks or paths exist on the northern side. Cruises on the loch are available from Glenfinnan, Acharacle and Polloch.

== Gallery ==
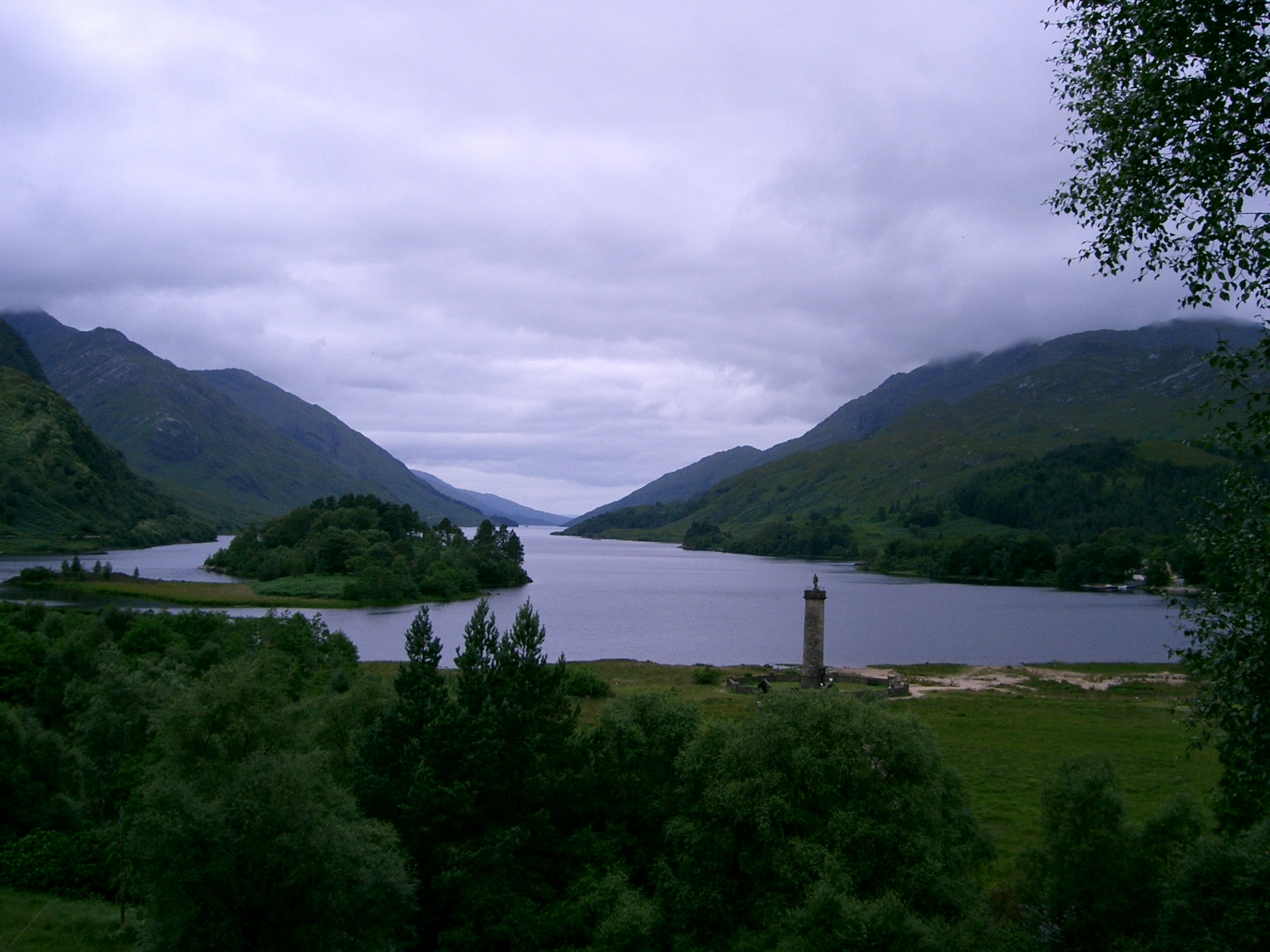

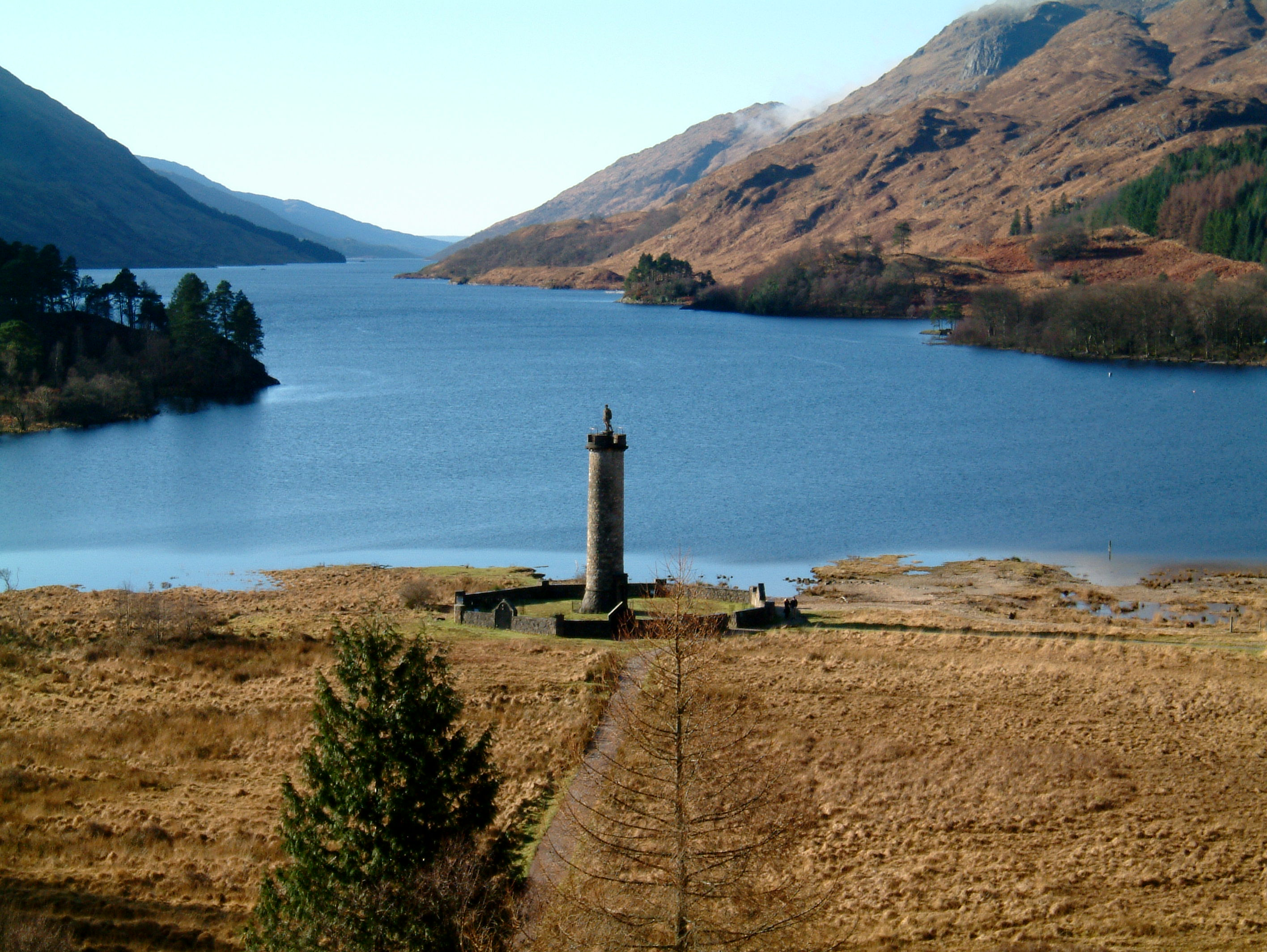
Glenfinnan bay

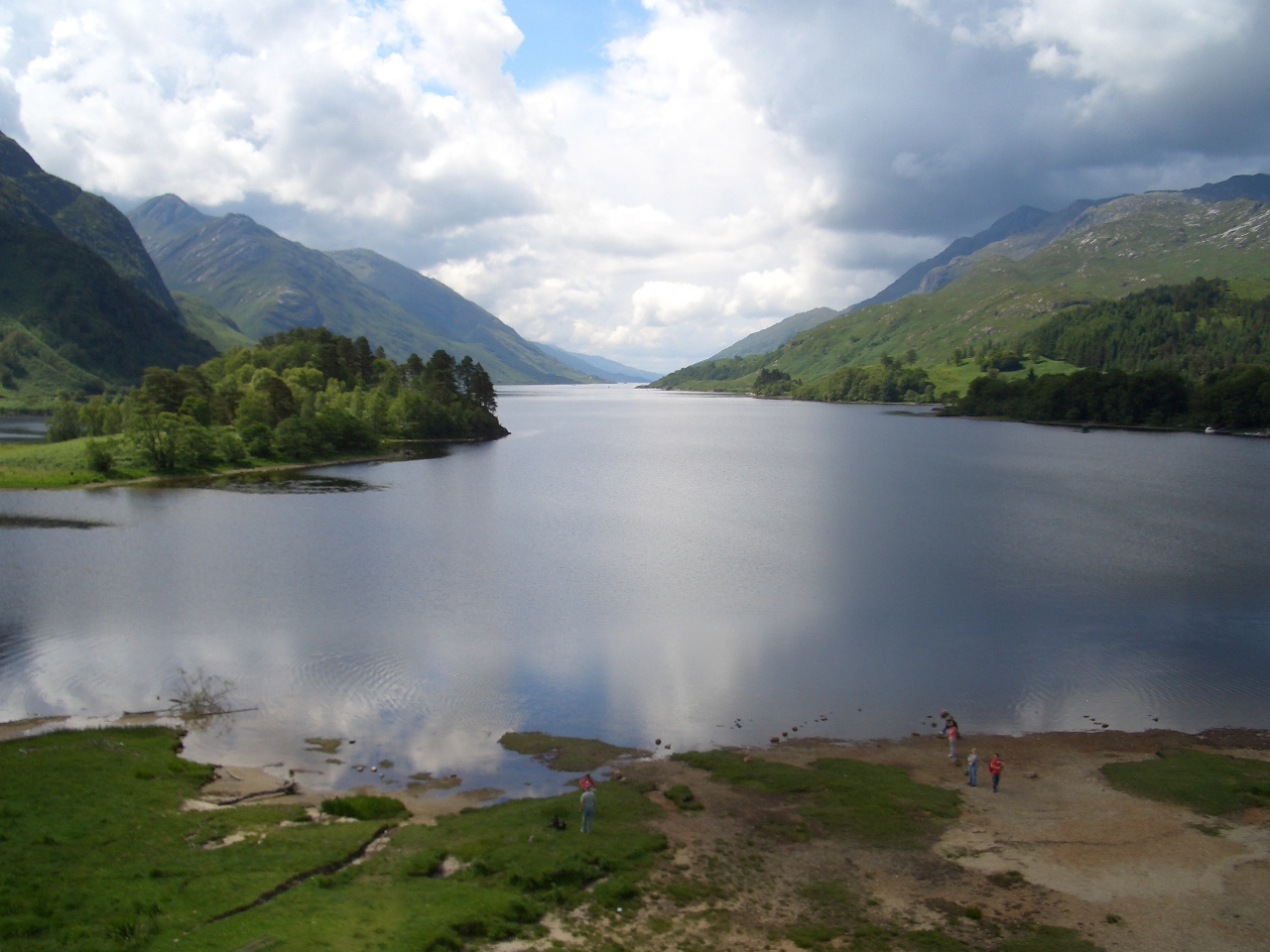
View from the top of the Glenfinnan Monument

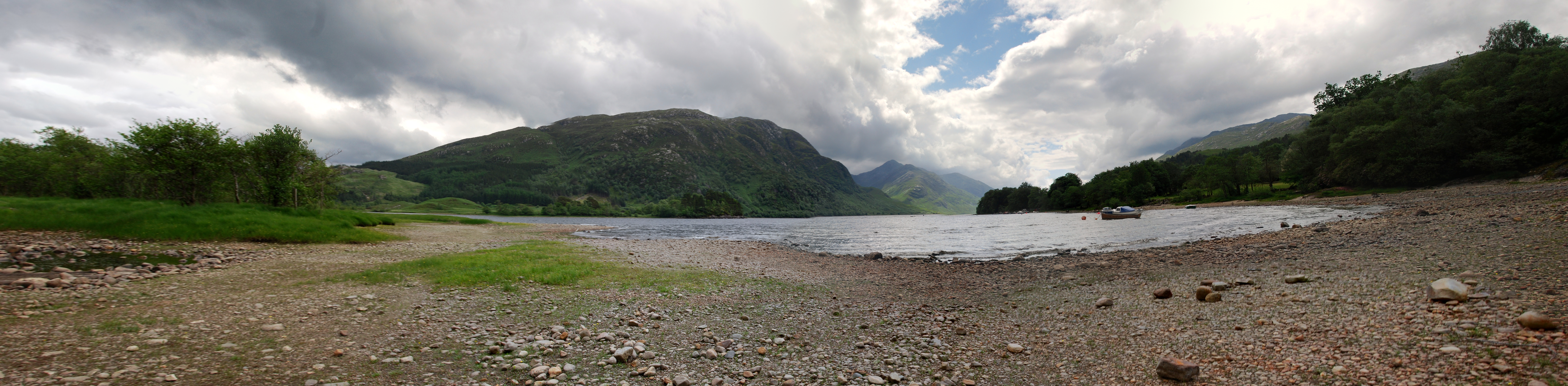
Loch Shiel Panorama, June 2010

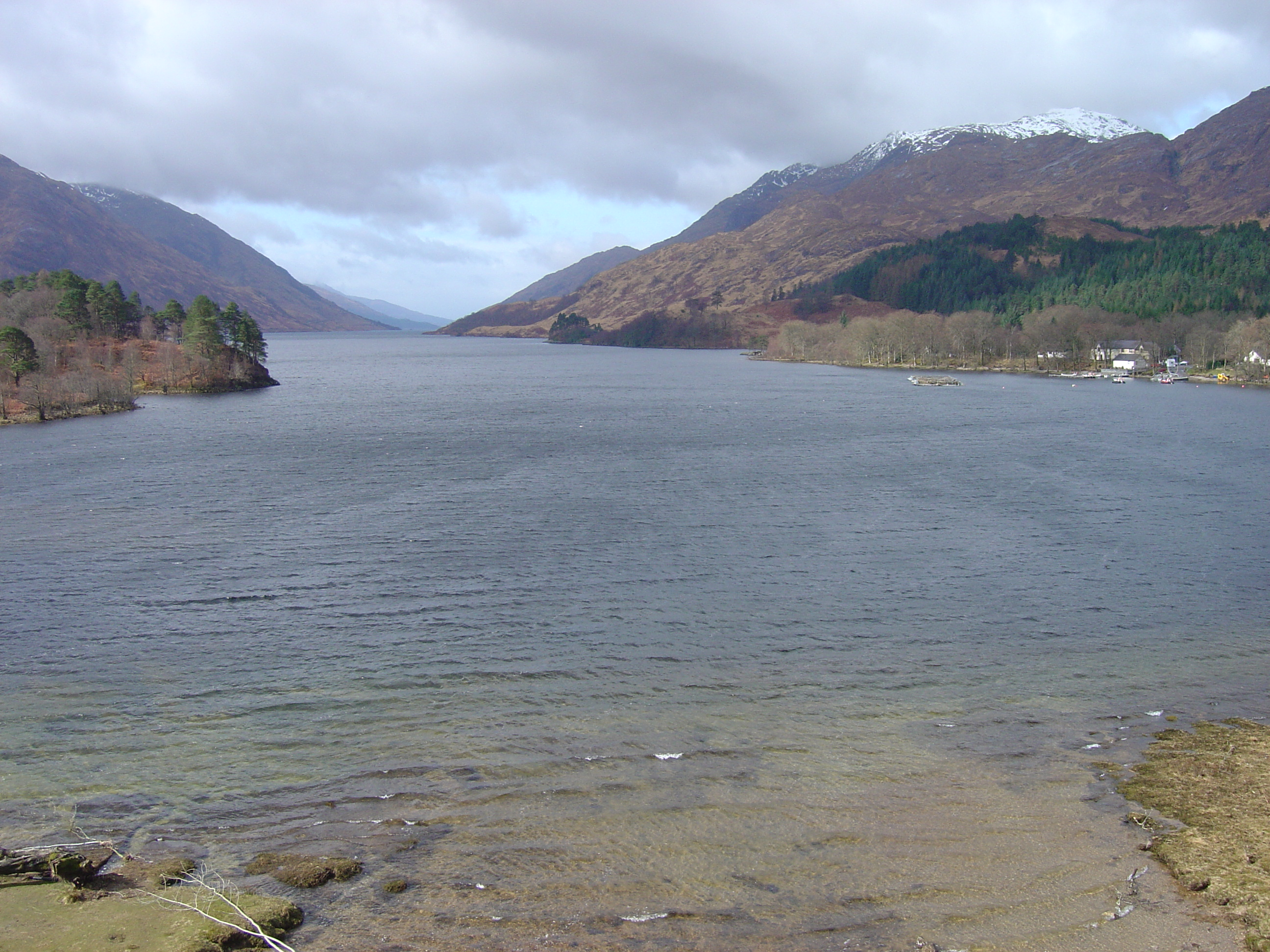
Photo taken at the shore of Loch Sheil behind the monument of the Unknown Highlander, April 2006

== See also ==
- Claish Moss
- Glenfinnan Viaduct
