= Lex Brown =

Lex Brown may refer to:

- Lex Brown (businessman), Scottish businessman
- Lex Brown (artist) (born 1989), American artist
- Alexis Brown (born 2001), American long jumper
