= Beinn Odhar Bheag =

Mountain in Scotland

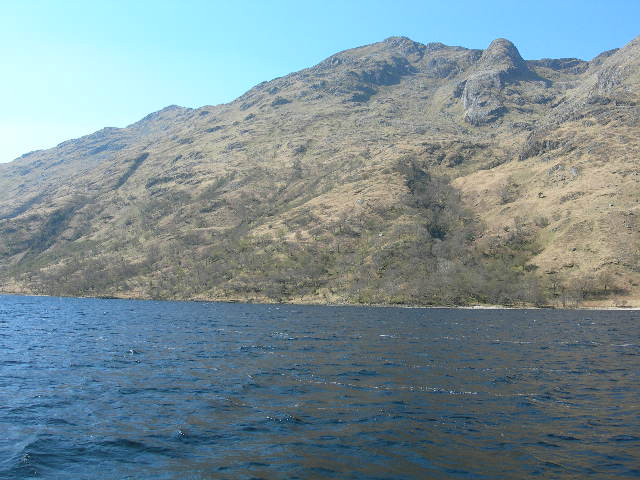
- Beinn Odhar Beag from Loch Shiel

Highest point
- Elevation: 882 m (2,894 ft)
- Prominence: 524 m (1,719 ft)
- Listing: Corbett, Marilyn
- Coordinates: 56°50′32″N 5°31′57″W

Geography
- Location: Lochaber, Scotland
- Parent range: Northwest Highlands
- OS grid: NM846778
- Topo map: OS Landranger 40

Beinn Odhar Bheag (882 m) is a mountain in the Northwest Highlands of Scotland, south of the village of Glenfinnan in Moidart, Lochaber. It shares the distinction of being the highest point in Moidart with Rois-bheinn, whose summit has the same elevation.

A rugged peak, Beinn Odhar Bheag towers over the western shore of Loch Shiel. Climbing routes on the mountain are rough, with many bogs on its lower slopes and few paths to its summit.
