= Lex Brown (businessman) =

Scottish businessman

- Born: Maybole, Ayrshire
- Died: 11 February 2022
- Occupation: Businessman

Lex Brown (born Maybole, Ayrshire) was a Scottish businessman. A former decorated RAF helicopter pilot, he came to public attention after buying Tioram Castle, in Moidart, for £300,000 in 1997.

There followed years of high-profile conflicts with Historic Scotland, Highland Council and other interested parties, including a public inquiry in 2002 and an appeal to the Scottish Government in 2006. Following a change of personnel at Historic Scotland., Brown renewed discussions with HS of his plans to reroof and live in Castle Tioram, though these are still at an early stage.

Brown was mostly brought up overseas, in Egypt and Ghana, where his father worked as a civil engineer. His Gaelic-speaking, west highland mother endowed Brown with a respect for his highland heritage.

After 20 years in the armed forces, Brown farmed on Loch Lomondside before making a fortune in the air cargo and oil exploration business.

Brown died peacefully on 11 February 2022 following a long illness and leaves a wife and two daughters. He was 76

== See also ==
- Bronson Conrad
