= Polloch =

Coordinates: 56.76062°N 5.6165°W

- Location within the Lochaber area
- Population: 16
- OS grid reference: NM790690
- Council area: Highland
- Country: Scotland
- Sovereign state: United Kingdom
- Post town: Glenfinnan
- Postcode district: PH37 4
- Police: Scotland
- Fire: Scottish
- Ambulance: Scottish

Polloch is a remote and picturesque hamlet, located at the north shore of the River Polloch, in an inlet that flows into Loch Shiel, in Inverness-shire, Scottish Highlands and is in the Scottish council area of Highland.
