= Christina of the Isles =

14th-century Scottish noblewoman

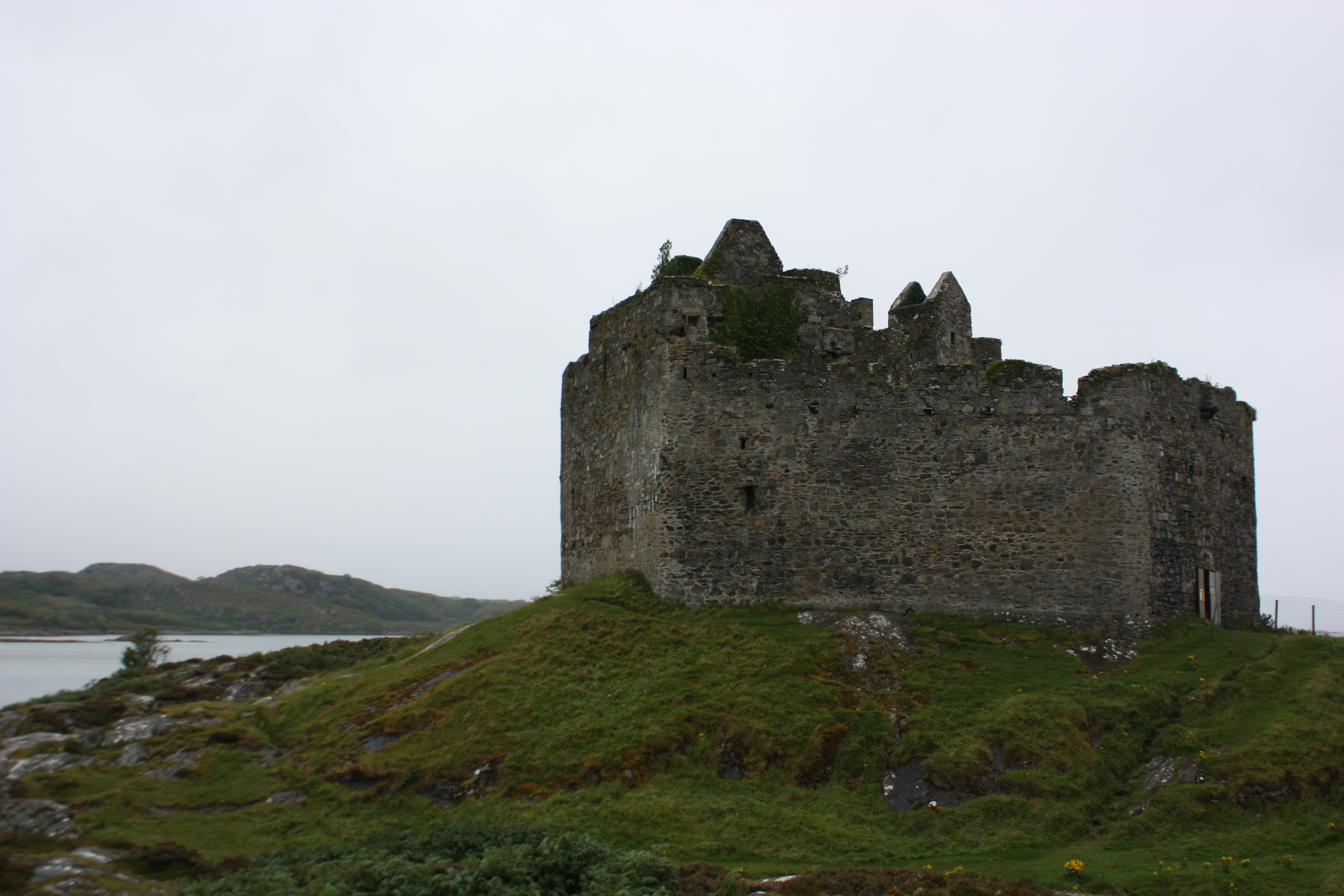
- Now-ruinous Castle Tioram may well have been a Clann Ruaidhrí stronghold. The island the fortress sits upon—"insula sicca"—is first recorded in a charter of Christina. (Note: The castle itself is first recorded in a later charter of Eóin Mac Domhnaill I, Lord of the Isles to his son, Raghnall Mac Domhnaill. The latter's mother was Áine Nic Ruaidhrí, Christina's niece, and a member of Clann Ruaidhrí. The fact the island is mentioned in Christina's charter could be evidence of the castle's existence at the time. Even if it had not been constructed by this date, the island must have been significant enough to be worthy of mention alongside other Clann Ruaidhrí territories. The seventeenth-century Sleat History states that the castle was constructed by Áine. Certainly, Castle Tioram served as the seat of Áine's Clann Raghnaill descendants for centuries.)
- Predecessor: Ailéan mac Ruaidhrí
- Successor: Ruaidhrí Mac Ruaidhrí
- Noble family: Clann Ruaidhrí
- Spouse: Donnchadh
- Issue: Ruaidhrí
- Father: Ailéan mac Ruaidhrí
- Mother: Isabella?

Christina of the Isles (fl. 1290–1318) was a fourteenth-century Scottish noblewoman. (Note: Since the 1960s, academics have accorded Christina various personal names in English secondary sources: Cairistíona, Christian, Christiana, Christina, Christine, and Cristina. She has been accorded various patronyms: Cairistíona d. Ailéan, Christian macRuari, Christian MacRuarie, Christiana MacRuairi, Christiana macRuairi, Christiana MacRuairidh, Christina Mac Ruairidh, Christina MacRuairi, Christina MacRuairidh, Christina MacRuairie, Christina MacRuari, Christina macRuari, Christina Macruari, Christina MacRuaridh, and Christina Macruarie. Christina has also been accorded various toponyms: Christian of Garmoran, Christian of Mar, Christian of the Isles, Christiana MacRuairi of Mar, Christiana MacRuairi of the Isles, Christiana MacRuairidh of the Isles, Christiana of Garmoran, Christiana of Mar, Christiana of the Isles, Christina MacRuairi of the Isles, Christina MacRuairidh of the Isles, Christina MacRuairie of Garmoran, Christina macRuari of the Isles, Christina MacRuaridh of the Isles, Christina of Garmoran, Christina of Mar, Christina of the Isles, Christine MacRuairi of the Isles, Christine of the Isles, and Cristina of Mar.) She was the daughter of Ailéan mac Ruaidhrí and a leading member of Clann Ruaidhrí. Although Ailéan had two sons, Lachlann and Ruaidhrí, both appear to have been illegitimate, whereas Christina was legitimate, and possibly a daughter of Ailéan's wife, Isabella.

A fourteenth-century source states that Christina assisted Robert I, King of Scotland during the First War of Scottish Independence, when he was a fugitive and hunted by the forces of Edward I, King of England. Another fourteenth-century source declares that, when Robert mounted a counteroffensive following Edward II's demise, the Scottish king received critical assistance from an unnamed kinswoman, a woman who may have been Christina herself. Christina's support of the Bruce cause may have stemmed from her marriage to Donnchadh, who was a member of the comital kindred of Mar, a family closely related to the Bruces. It is also possible that Christina was influenced by her maternal ancestry, since there is reason to suspect that her mother was a sister of Robert's mother.

Although Christina was the canonically legitimate heir of her father, it is likely that her brothers possessed control of their family's wide-ranging territories. According to an undated charter, Christina resigned her rights to Ruaidhrí on the condition that her son possessed a stake in the inheritance. At some point following Ruaidhrí's apparent demise in 1318, Christina attempted to transfer most of the Clann Ruaidhrí lordship into the hands of Artúr Caimbéal, in what may have been a marriage alliance with the Caimbéalaigh (the Campbells). Despite this contract with Artúr, which may have had royal approval, it is apparent that Christina's nephew, Ruaidhrí's son Raghnall Mac Ruaidhrí, was able to succeed as chief of Clann Ruaidhrí. The recorded royal forfeiture of a certain "Roderici de Ylay" may refer to Raghnall, and could be evidence of him countering Christina's attempt to alienate the family lands. Further violent repercussions of Christina's contract with the Caimbéalaigh may have been felt well into the next century, since James I, King of Scotland is recorded to have executed two chieftains who may have been continuing the feud.

== Family ==
Christina was a daughter of Ailéan mac Ruaidhrí, who was a son of Ruaidhrí mac Raghnaill, Lord of Kintyre, eponym of Clann Ruaidhrí. Ailéan had two sons: Lachlann and Ruaidhrí. Whilst Christina was legitimate, her brothers were evidently illegitimate.

Ailéan is attested as late as 1284, when he attended a government council at Scone. He certainly disappears from record by 1296, and seems to have died at some point before this date. Ailéan's widow was Isabella, a woman who may well have been Christina's mother. At some point between the deaths of Ailéan and Alexander III, King of Scotland, Isabella married Ingram de Umfraville. If Christina was still a child at the time, it is possible that she was raised by Ingram.

In February 1293, the Scottish parliament supported a claim of Ingram and Isabella concerning a grant of one hundred merks of land in tenancy (forty merks of which were located in the sheriffdom of Carrick). It was agreed that these rights—from the tocher of Isabella's marriage to Ailéan—were to be retained by the couple unless Ailéan's heirs were able to recover them. The same year, the Scottish Crown created several new sheriffdoms in the western reaches of the realm. One of the new shrievalties was the sheriffdom of Skye, a jurisdiction that not only encompassed Clann Ruaidhrí territories, but was placed under the authority of the Earl of Ross.

== Supporter of the Bruce cause ==
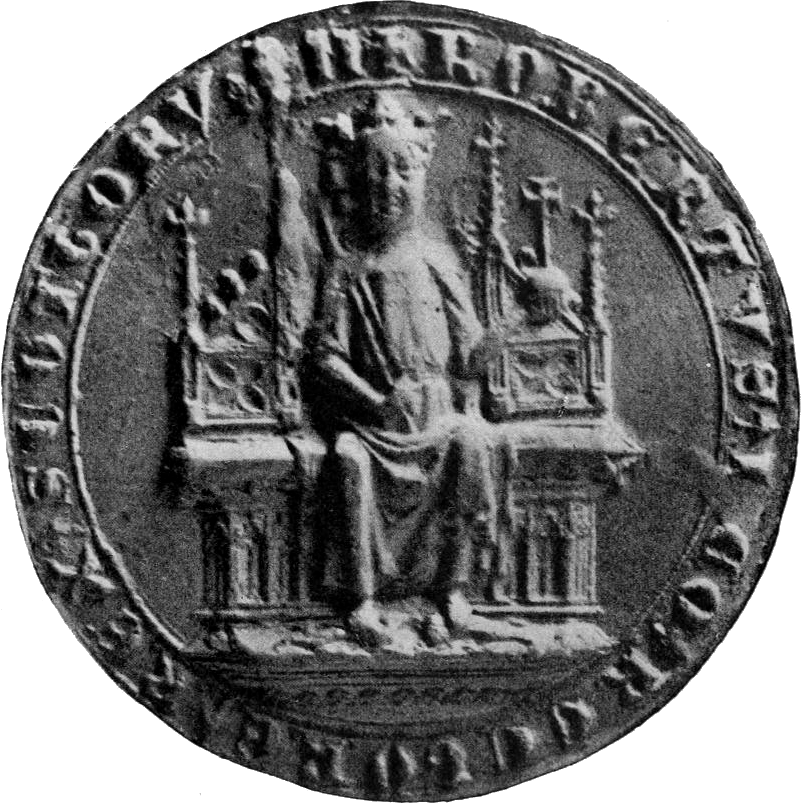
The seal of Robert I.

In 1296, Edward I, King of England invaded and easily conquered the Scottish realm. Like most other Scottish landholders, Lachlann and Christina rendered homage to the triumphant king later in August.

In February 1306, Robert Bruce VII, Earl of Carrick, a claimant to the Scottish throne, killed his chief rival to the kingship, John Comyn of Badenoch. Although the former seized the throne (as Robert I) in March, the English Crown immediately struck back, defeating his forces in June. By September, Robert was a fugitive, and appears to have escaped into the Hebrides. (Note: There is reason to suspect that Robert I had been fostered by a family in either Ireland or the west coast of Scotland. Candidates include Clann Domhnaill and Clann Ruaidhrí.)

According to the fourteenth-century Gesta Annalia II, Christina played an instrumental part in Robert's survival at this low point in his career, sheltering him along Scotland's western seaboard. (Note: Christina is further stated to have aided the king by the fifteenth-century Liber Pluscardensis.) The fourteenth-century Chronicle of Lanercost and the fourteenth-century Guisborough Chronicle relate that Robert indeed utilised military support drawn from Ireland and the Hebrides. Certainly, Edward I thought that Robert was hidden somewhere amongst the islands on the western seaboard. There is, therefore, reason to suspect that Christina made a significant material contribution to the Bruce cause with funds, ships, and men.

One possible way in which Christina and her husband were maritally related with Robert I. Women are italicised.

Uilleam; E of Mar
Donnchadh | Christina | Domhnall I E of Mar | Robert Bruce VI; E of Carrick
Ruaidhrí | Gartnait; E of Mar | unknown | Iseabail | Robert I K of Scotland

Another possible way in which Christina and her husband were maritally related with Robert I. Women are italicised.

Domhnall I E of Mar | Robert Bruce VI; E of Carrick
Donnchadh | Christina | Gartnait; E of Mar | unknown | Iseabail | Robert I K of Scotland
Ruaidhrí

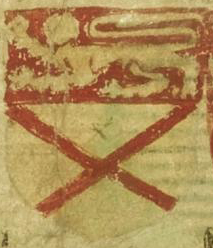
The arms of the Earl of Carrick depicted in the fourteenth-century Balliol roll. Christina's mother may have been a member of the comital kindred of Carrick.

Christina's connections with the Mar kindred could well account for her support of the Bruce cause. Whilst she was certainly married to a member of this comital family, the parentage of her spouse is uncertain. One possibility is that her husband, Donnchadh, was a younger son of Uilleam, Earl of Mar. Another possibility is that Donnchadh was a son of Uilleam's son, Domhnall I, Earl of Mar. Certainly, Domhnall I's daughter, Iseabail, was the first wife of Robert, and Domhnall I's son and comital successor, Gartnait, was the husband of a sister of Robert. (Note: The Mar-Bruce unions meant that these families were bound politically, especially considering the fact that the heir of the family, Gartnait, had a Bruce wife.) The fact that Christina is described as a widow in the record of her homage to Edward I—the very day that Domhnall I's son Donnchadh is also recorded to have submitted to the king—could be evidence that her husband had indeed been a son Uilleam. (Note: On the other hand, "widow" could be a mistake. Nevertheless, if Christina's husband was indeed a son of Uilleam, and dead by the time of her homage, her husband is certainly attested in 1267/1268, when he and Domhnall I witnessed a charter of their father to St Andrews Priory. The marriage of Christina and Donnchadh may have been orchestrated in the context of integrating the peripheral Clann Ruaidhrí into the Scottish realm. At about the same time, a similar marital alliance was undertaken by Clann Dubhghaill and the Comyn kindred. Uilleam was one of the Scottish magnates who led punitive expeditions into the Isles in 1264 on behalf of the Scottish Crown.)

But when he had borne these things for nearly a year alone, God, at length, took pity on him; and, aided by the help and power of a certain noble lady, Christiana of the Isles, who wished him well, he, after endless toils, smart, and distress, got back, by a round-about way, to the earldom of Carrick.

— excerpt from Gesta Annalia II depicting the assistance given to the fugitive Robert I by Christina.

Later in 1307, at about the time of Edward I's death in July, Robert mounted a remarkable return to power by first consolidating control of Carrick. Christina may well have possessed further connections with the returning king. For example, there is reason to suspect that her mother was a member of the comital kindred of Carrick, and perhaps a sister of Robert's mother, Marjorie, Countess of Carrick. According to the fourteenth-century Bruce, whilst Robert consolidated power in Carrick, he received provisions and military manpower from a woman described as a closely related kinswoman of his. The poem states that this unidentified woman lent the king forty men, a number which may correspond to the forty merks worth of lands assigned to Ingram and Isabella in Carrick. Over two decades later, in 1328/1329, Robert is recorded to have provided an allowance of forty shillings to someone named Christian of Carrick. (Note: It is uncertain whether this person was male or female.) If Christina's mother was indeed a member of the Carrick kindred, and closely related to the Scottish king, Christina herself could well be identical to the kinswoman noted by the Bruce, and to the person who received the forty shilling allowance from the king. (Note: Another possibility is that Christian was an illegitimate daughter of Robert, and that the woman noted by the Bruce was a mistress of the king. Alternately, it is possible that the records of Christian and the unnamed pensioner refer to the same individual, a mistress.)

== Ruaidhrí and the Clann Ruaidhrí succession ==
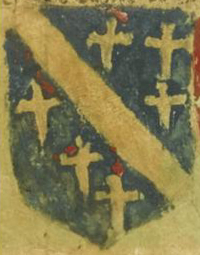
The arms of the Earl of Mar depicted in the Balliol roll. Christina's husband, Donnchadh, was a member of the comital kindred of Mar, although his precise parentage is uncertain.

Whilst the sources outlining with Christina's career suggest that she was a consistent supporter of the Bruce cause, those that outline the careers of her half-brothers suggest that they may have been more ambitious and opportunistic. Lachlann last appears on record in 1307/1308 in correspondence between William II, Earl of Ross and Edward II, King of England, in which the earl complained about Lachlann's audacity and rebelliousness. After this date, Ruaidhrí appears to have succeeded Lachlann.

Although Christina seems to have been the sole legitimate offspring of their father, it is unlikely that members of the kindred regarded canonically legitimate birth as the sole qualification of succession. In fact, there was little distinction between legitimate and illegitimate offspring in Gaelic Scotland, as society tolerated temporary sexual unions amongst the elite as a means of furthering the continuation of the male line of the clan. As the leading male member of Clann Ruaidhrí at this stage, it is probable that Ruaidhrí himself possessed control of the kindred's wide-ranging territories. Nevertheless, Ruaidhrí seems to have only gained formal recognition of his rights to the lordship after Christina's resignation of her own claims, by way of a charter confirmed by Robert himself.

But a lady of that country who was in a close degree of relationship to him, was greatly cheered at his arrival, and forthwith hurried to him in great haste accompanied by forty men [whom] she gave to the king to help him in his campaigning.

Many times she comforted the king, both with money and with food such as she could get in the land.

— excerpts from the Bruce depicting the assistance given to the fugitive Robert I by an unidentified woman who could be identical with Christina.

There is reason to suspect that Christina's stake in the lordship—and her close connections with Robert—posed a potential threat to Ruaidhrí and his descendants. Furthermore, Christina had a son, Ruaidhrí, who potentially could have sought royal assistance in pursuance of his mother's claims. The name that Christina bestowed upon this son could indicate that he was not only named after his maternal grandfather, but that he was intended to be a potential successor to the Clann Ruaidhrí lordship. Certainly, Christina resigned her claims with the condition that, if her brother died without a male heir, and her like-named son married one of her brother's daughters, Christina's son would secure the inheritance. Although this resignation charter is undated, it seems to have been granted early in the reign of Robert, possibly before the end of the first decade the century.

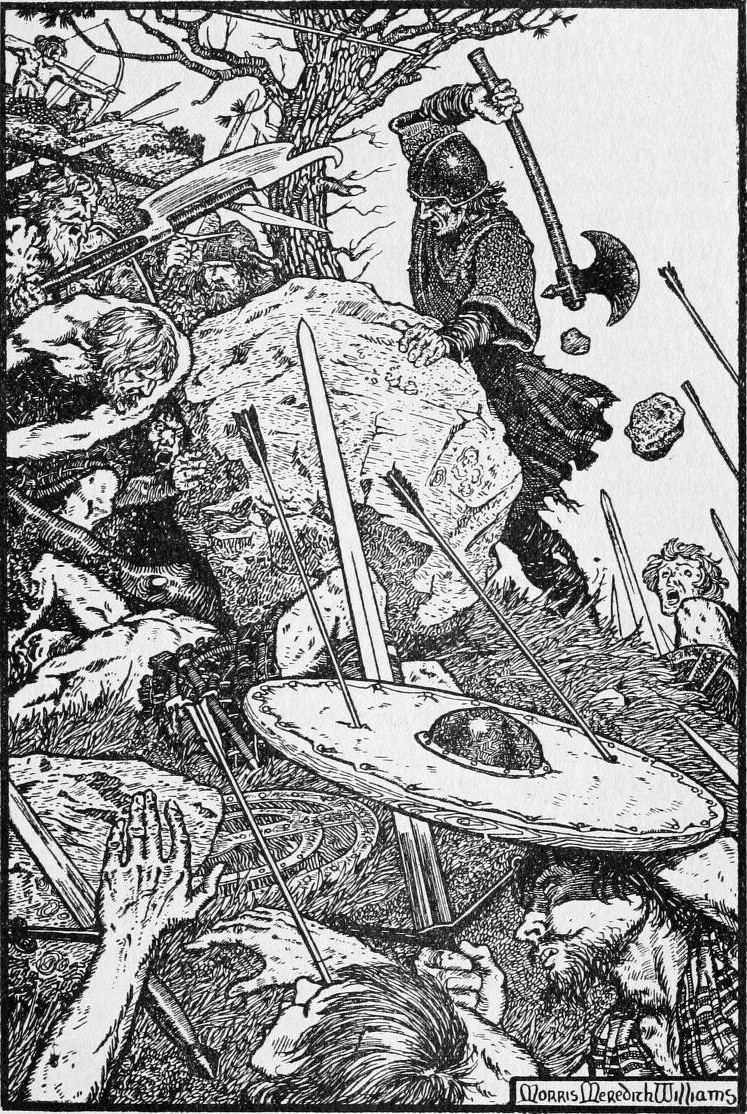
An early twentieth-century depiction of the Battle of the Pass of Brander, a conflict in which Robert I defeated Clann Dubhghaill in about 1308, probably with the aid of Clann Ruaidhrí and Clann Domhnaill. Warriors from the Clann Ruaidhrí lordship may have also played a major part in Robert I's victory at Loudoun Hill.

On one hand, it is possible that the king orchestrated Ruaidhrí's succession to the lordship as a means of securing the continued support from Clann Ruaidhrí, one of the most powerful families on the western coast. On the other hand, the fact that Christina—a close personal ally of Robert—had been superseded by Ruaidhrí—a man with a comparatively chequered political career—could indicate that the latter's consolidation of control more likely stemmed from internal family politics than from royal interference. Whilst the contract between Christina and Ruaidhrí concerned the understanding that the Clann Ruaidhrí lordship should remain (at least temporarily) in the possession of the male line of the kindred, it recognised Christina's rights to the heritage, and accepted the somewhat looser marriage customs in this region of the realm. Whilst it is possible that the father of Christina's son was Donnchadh, the fact that the former is not specifically identified as Christina's heir could indicate that he himself was illegitimate.

In any case, Ruaidhrí was likely already regarded as the rightful chief, and the charter itself undeniably brought him under feudal dependence of the Scottish Crown. Ruaidhrí's provincial lordship encompassed the mainland territories of Moidart, Arisaig, Morar, and Knoydart; as well as the island territories of Rhum, Eigg, Barra, St Kilda, and Uist. This dominion, like the great lordships of Annandale and Galloway, was comparable to any of the kingdom's thirteen earldoms. Nevertheless, it was during this period that several western kindreds—such as Clann Domhnaill and the Caimbéalaigh (the Campbells)—were richly rewarded for their service to the Bruce cause with extensive grants of lands carved out of former Clann Dubhghaill territories forfeited by the king. The evidence of internal discord within Clann Ruaidhrí could account for the fact that the family failed to make similar gains in the wake of Clann Dubhghaill's downfall.

== Raghnall and the Clann Ruaidhrí succession ==
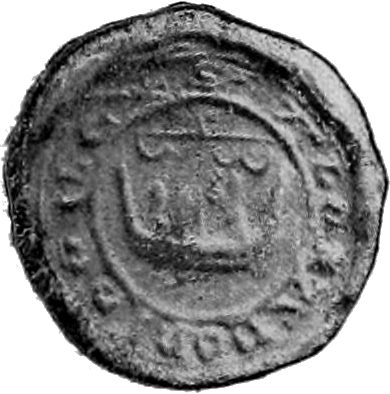
The seal of Alasdair Óg Mac Domhnaill. The device shows a manned galley. Christina's resignations to Ruaidhrí Mac Ruaidhrí and Artúr Caimbéal stipulated that the men owed the Scottish Crown the service of an armed ship. Such conditions exemplify the importance placed upon sea power at the time.

Ruaidhrí appears to be identical to the Clann Ruaidhrí dynast—styled "King of the Hebrides"—who lost his life in the service of the Bruce campaign in Ireland in 1318. Although Ruaidhrí seems to have ensured the continuation of his kindred by formally coming to terms with Robert and campaigning in Ireland with the latter's brother, there is evidence indicating that the Clann Ruaidhrí inheritance was contested by Christina after his demise. At the time of his death, Ruaidhrí's son, Raghnall, may well have been under age, and it is apparent that Christina and her confederates again attempted to seize control of the inheritance. Although she is recorded to have resigned her claimed rights to a certain Artúr Caimbéal at some point after Ruaidhrí's death, it is clear that Raghnall succeeded in securing the region, and was regarded as the chief of Clann Ruaidhrí by most of his kin.

One possibility is that the scheme between Christina and Artúr was undertaken in the context of a marital alliance between her and Artúr's family, the Caimbéalaigh. Robert is otherwise known to have granted the constableship of Dunstaffnage Castle, a former Clann Dubhghaill stronghold, to a certain Artúr Caimbéal. The precise identity of this officer is uncertain, however, as there was a father and son who bore this name. Whilst the constableship may have been awarded to the senior-most Artúr—the apparent founding ancestor of the Strachur branch of the Caimbéalaigh—Christina's transaction appears to have concerned the constable's son, a man who may have been intended to marry her. (Note: The fact that Christina is called a widow, and is not styled "of Mar", appears to be evidence that the charter dates to after Donnchadh's death.)

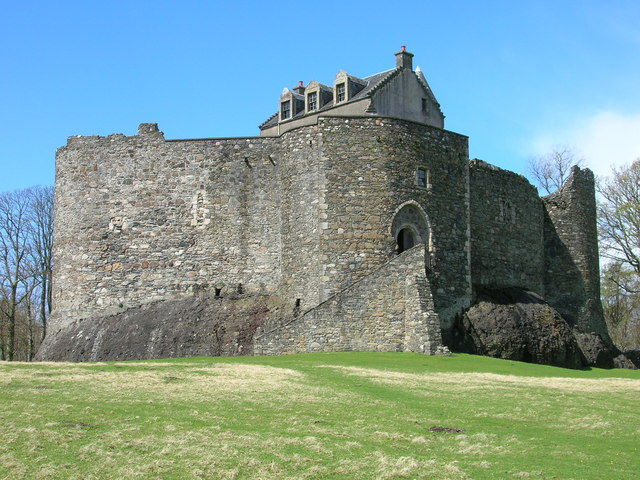
The establishment of the constabulary of Dunstaffnage Castle in the 1320s appears to have been undertaken in the context of royally sanctioned encroachment into Clann Ruaidhrí territories. Christina attempted to transfer the Clann Ruaidhrí lordship into the hands of the constable's son.

In 1325, a certain "Roderici de Ylay" suffered the forfeiture of his possessions by Robert. Although this record could refer to a member of Clann Domhnaill, another possibility is that the individual actually refers to a member of Clann Ruaidhrí. If this record indeed refers to a member of the latter kindred, the man in question may well have been Raghnall himself. If so, the forfeiture could have stemmed from resistance advanced by Raghnall to counter Christina's attempts to alienate the Clann Ruaidhrí estate from him and transfer it into the clutches of the Caimbéalaigh. Alternately, the forfeiture could have been ratified in response to undesirable Clann Ruaidhrí expansion into certain neighbouring territories, regions such as the former lands of the disinherited Clann Dubhghaill.

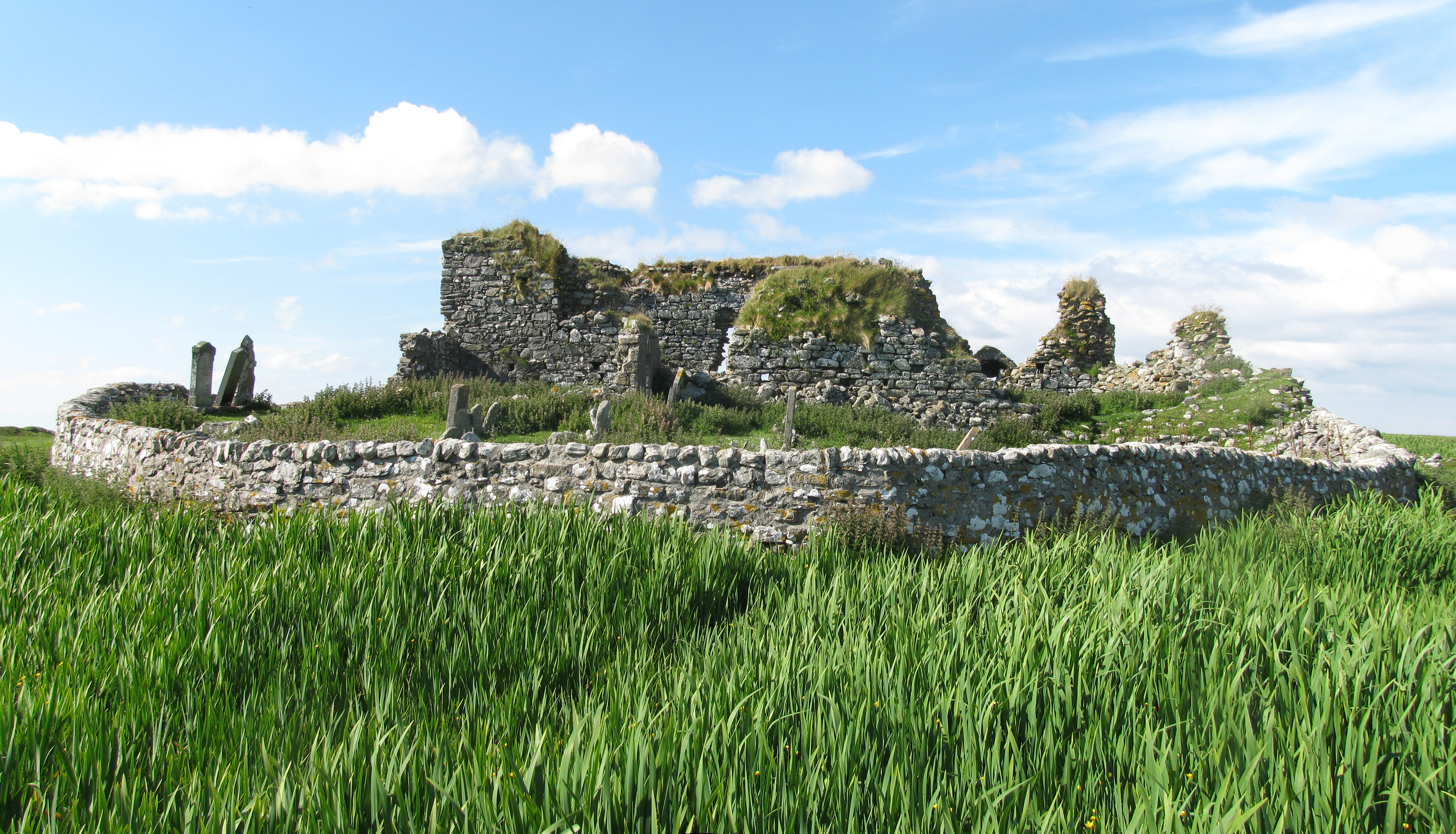
Although the now-ruinous Teampull na Trionaid is traditionally said to have been constructed by Christina's niece, Áine Nic Ruaidhrí, this church is recorded to have been in existence during Christina's floruit.

Although Christina's resignation charter to Artúr is undated, it could date to just before the forfeiture. The list of witnesses who attested the grant is remarkable, and may be evidence that the charter had royal approval. The witnesses include: John Menteith, Domhnall Caimbéal, Alasdair Mac Neachdainn, Eóghan Mac Íomhair, Donnchadh Caimbéal (son of Tomás Caimbéal), Niall Mac Giolla Eáin, and (the latter's brother) Domhnall Mac Giolla Eáin. (Note: John Menteith could be identical to either the father or son who bore the name.) These men all seem to have been close adherents of Robert against Clann Dubhghaill, and all represented families of power along the western seaboard. An alliance of such men may well have been an intimidating prospect to the Clann Ruaidhrí leadership.

The forfeiture could have been personally reinforced by Robert, as he seems to have travelled to Tarbert Castle—an imposing royal stronghold in Kintyre—within the same year. (Note: The brothers Niall Mac Giolla Eáin and Domhnall Mac Giolla Eáin, along with another brother, Eóin Mac Giolla Eáin, are associated with the castle at about this time.) There is reason to suspect that the establishment of the Caimbéalaigh constabulary of Dunstaffnage formed part of a plan to create a new western sheriffdom based at Tarbert. Although the king had previously allowed the succession of Raghnall's father in the first decade of the century, it is evident that by the early 1320s the Scottish Crown was allowing and assisting in the expansion of families such as the Caimbéalaigh at the expense of families like Clann Ruaidhrí. In fact, it may have been at the Scone parliament of 1323—perhaps at the same time that work on Tarbert Castle was authorised—that the constabulary was granted to the Caimbéalaigh, along with lands in Benderloch, Ardnastaffnage, Inverawe, and other places in Lorn. This royal grant may well have overturned previous grants of former Clann Dubhghaill possessions to members of Clann Ruaidhrí. (Note: Strife between regional factions may account for the order passed by parliament in 1318 that forbade noblemen to prosecute disputes "arising from the war". Such disputes may have concerned families like Clann Ruaidhrí and Clann Domhnaill against the Stewarts, Menteiths, and the Caimbéalaigh.)

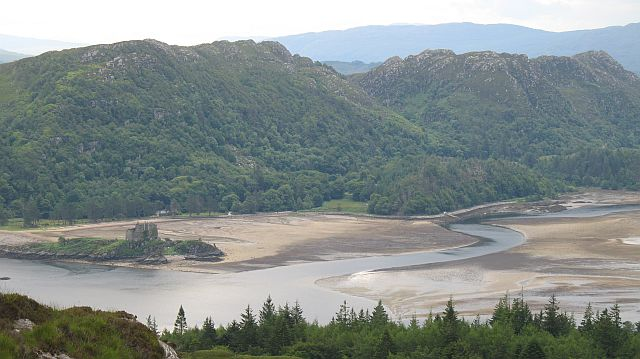
Eilean Tioram, the tidal island upon which sits Castle Tioram, is first attested in Christina's charter to Artúr.

Christina's charter to Artúr grants the latter the territories of Moidart, Arisaig, Morar, the islands of Eigg and Rhum together with the small islands that belonged to them, as well as Eilean Tioram. For his part, Artúr and his heirs were compelled to outfit a ship of twenty oars for the common army of the King of Scotland. (Note: The fact that Artúr owed the king ship service exemplies the importance placed upon sea power at the time. Christina's earlier resignation charter to Ruaidhrí stipulated that the latter had to outfit a ship of twenty-six oars. The charter-evidence from Robert's reign indicates that the typical unit of military service for the greatest of his western nobles was an oared ship, usually one of twenty-six oars.) Whilst Christina's charter includes most of the Clann Ruaidhrí lands noted in her brother's earlier royal grant, it fails to note a significant swathe of lands on Uist. One possibility is that Christina intended for these island territories to be retained by herself or perhaps a male representative of Clann Ruaidhrí, whilst diverting the bulk of the family estate to the Caimbéalaigh. On the other hand, it is also possible that the unnoted island territories were no longer part of the Clann Ruaidhrí lordship.

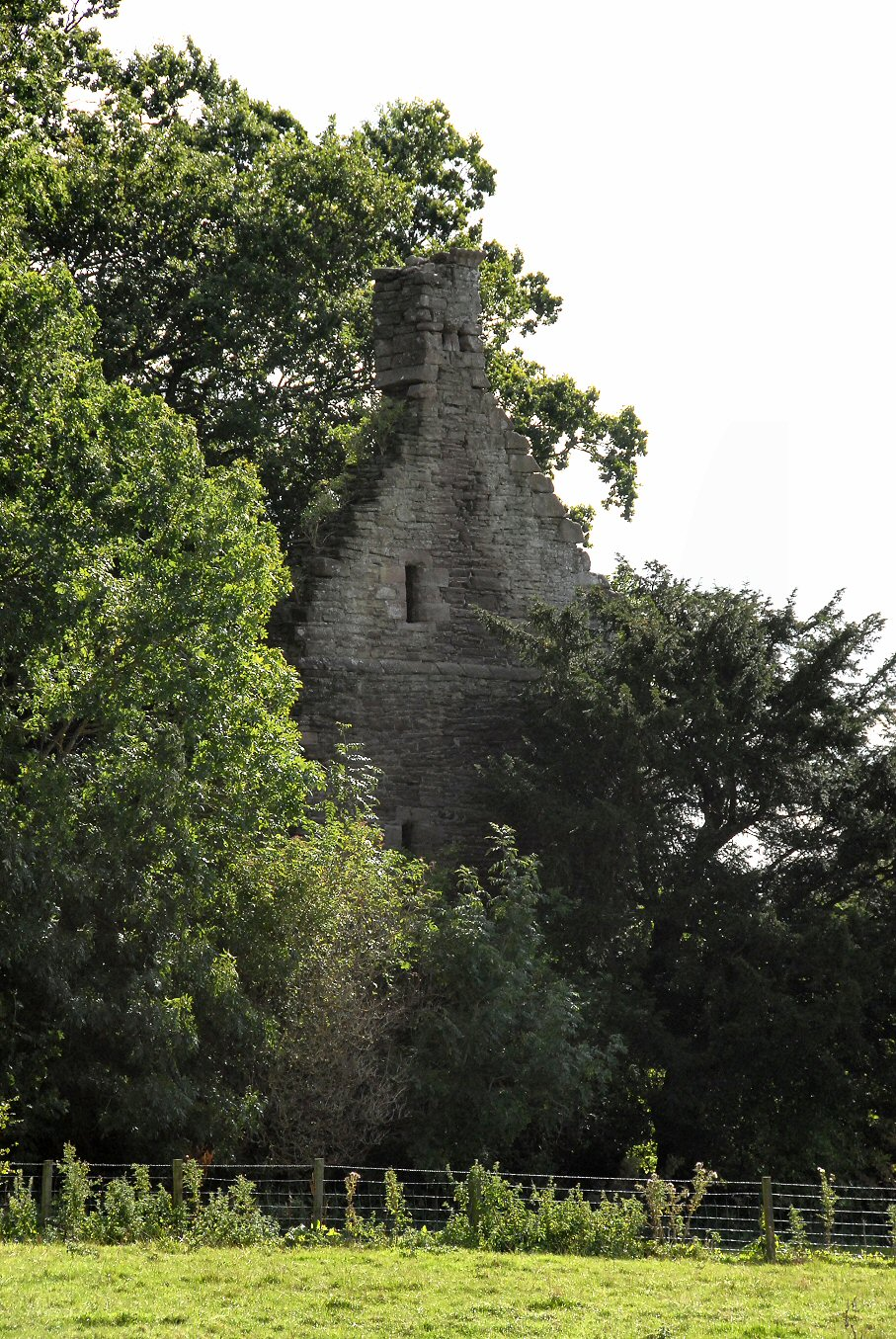
Now-ruinous Inchaffray Abbey is recorded to have been patronised by Robert I and Christina herself.

Two later charter confirmations record that, at some point during her career, Christina granted Teampull na Trionaid (Church of the Holy Trinity), and certain lands in Carinish and Illeray on Uist, to Inchaffray Abbey. The first of these confirmations is a 1389 grant of Gofraidh Mac Domhnaill, a man whose mother was Áine Nic Ruaidhrí, Christina's niece. (Note: According to the Sleat History, Teampull na Trionaid was built by Áine along with numerous other ecclesiastical sites in the Hebrides.) The second confirmation is a 1410 grant of Gofraidh's half-brother, Domhnall Mac Domhnaill, Lord of the Isles. Whilst is it possible that these two confirmations indeed preserve evidence of ecclesiastical grants made by Christina, it is also possible that the confirmations are unreliable. For example, the records could have been fabricated to include Christina as a means of furthering the territorial claims of the Clann Domhnaill branch descended from Gofraidh. If the confirmations are reliable, however, they could indicate that Christina was granting away lands formerly held by other members of her family—lands which may have been forfeited. Furthermore, if the confirmations are to be believed, Christina's patronage of Inchaffray Abbey could be further evidence of her association with the Bruces, since this religious house in known to have been patronised by Robert himself.

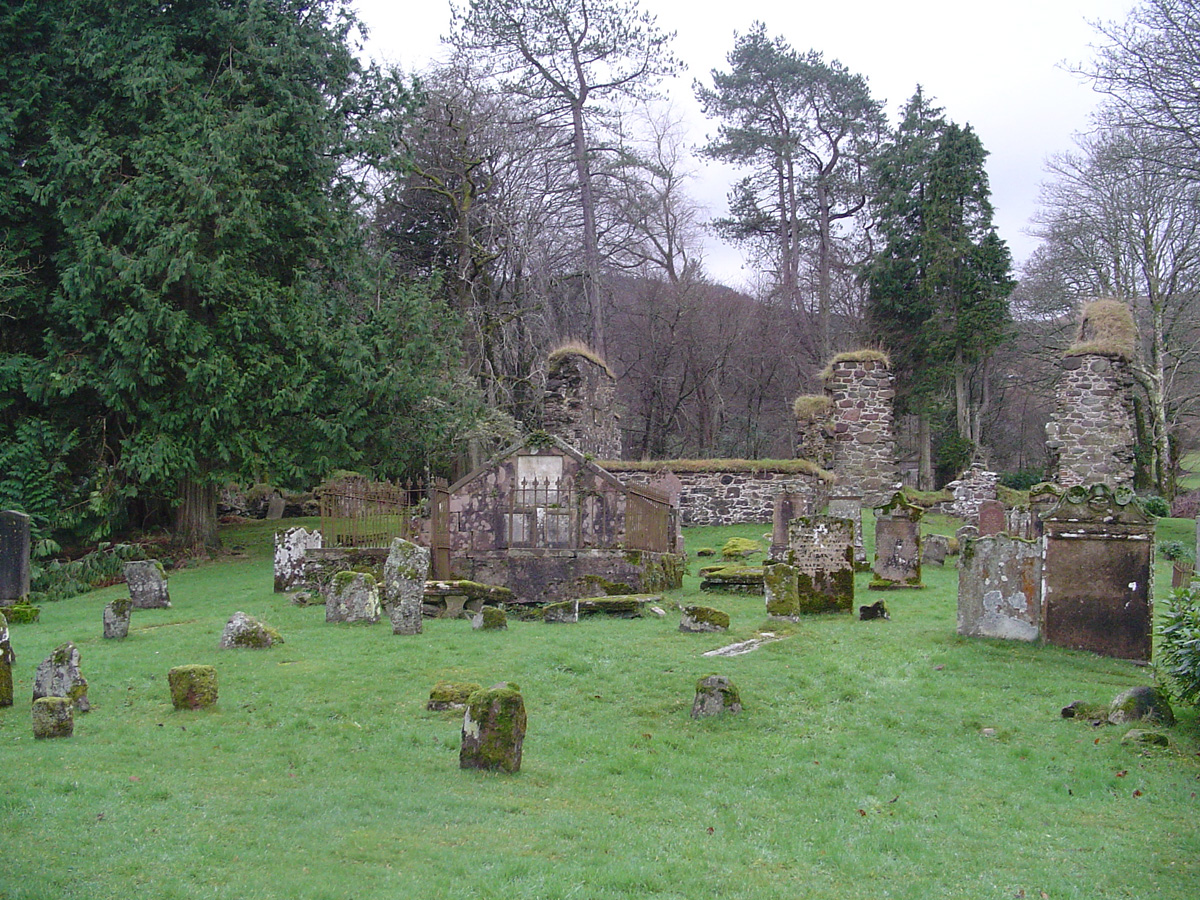
The ruins of Saddell Abbey, a religious house originally founded by ancestors of Clann Ruaidhrí, and patronised by Christina herself.

Christina's contract with Artúr may have had later consequences, as exemplified by the royal executions of two Highland chieftains in 1428: a certain Alasdair Mac Ruaidhrí and Eóin Mac Artair, both who are recorded to have commanded one thousand men apiece. Although the identities of these men are uncertain, it is possible that the former was a member of Clann Ruaidhrí, and that the latter was a member of the Strachur branch of the Caimbéalaigh, and seemingly a descendant of Artúr himself. As such, the executed chieftains could have been continuing a feud that stemmed from Christina's contested inheritance and connections with the Caimbéalaigh. (Note: On the other hand, another possibility is that Alasdair was a descendant of Gofraidh. If correct, Alasdair could have been pursuing ancestral claims by right of Gofraidh's heritage.)

A papal confirmation dating to 1393 records that Christina granted the island of Davaar to Saddell Abbey. According to a twentieth-century Uist account of dubious authority, Christina was associated with a school at a local nunnery where girls were taught manual crafts.

== Christina in fiction ==
Christina is a significant character in The Path of the Hero King, the second part of Nigel Tranter's Bruce trilogy. In it, she has an affair with Bruce, while sheltering him during his time on the run.
