= River Shiel =

Coordinates: 56°45′25″N 5°49′00″W

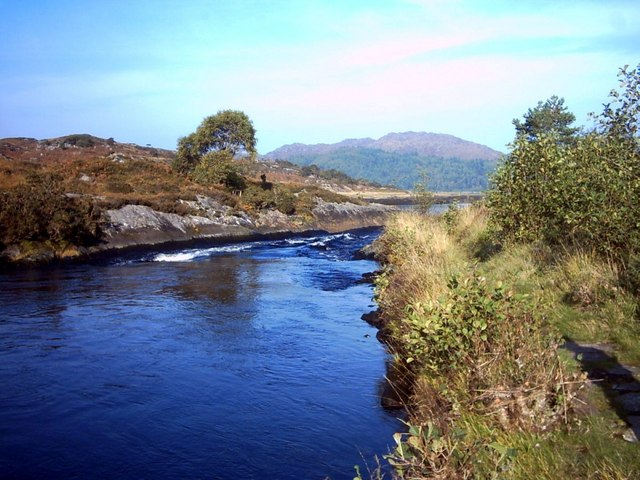
View of the rapids at the mouth of the Shiel, with Eilean Shona beyond

The River Shiel (Scottish Gaelic: Abhainn Seile) is a four-kilometre-long river between Moidart and Ardnamurchan in the Scottish Highlands. It begins at Acharacle, at the western end of Loch Shiel, and flows northwest towards Dorlin, where it empties into Loch Moidart. The river contains salmon and sea trout, as well as native resident brown trout weighing up to six pounds.
