= Amy of Garmoran =

Scottish noblewoman

Amie, daughter of Ruaidhri
- Born: early 1300s?
- Died: late 1300s?
- Spouse: John of Islay, Lord of the Isles
- Children: John (Eoin), Godfrey (Gofraidh), Ranald (Raghnall)
- Parent(s): Ruaidhri mac Ailein, mother unknown

Amy of Garmoran also known as Amie MacRuari and Euphemia was a 14th-century Scottish noblewoman who was the sister of Raghnall mac Ruaidhri, Lord of Garmoran and the spouse of John of Islay. After her marriage had produced three sons, the ambitious John of Islay divorced her in order to remarry and cement his links with the House of Stewart. She then retired to her estates in the Highlands and Islands, and completed various ecclesiastical and other building projects. Her son Ranald was the progenitor of Clanranald.

== Descent ==
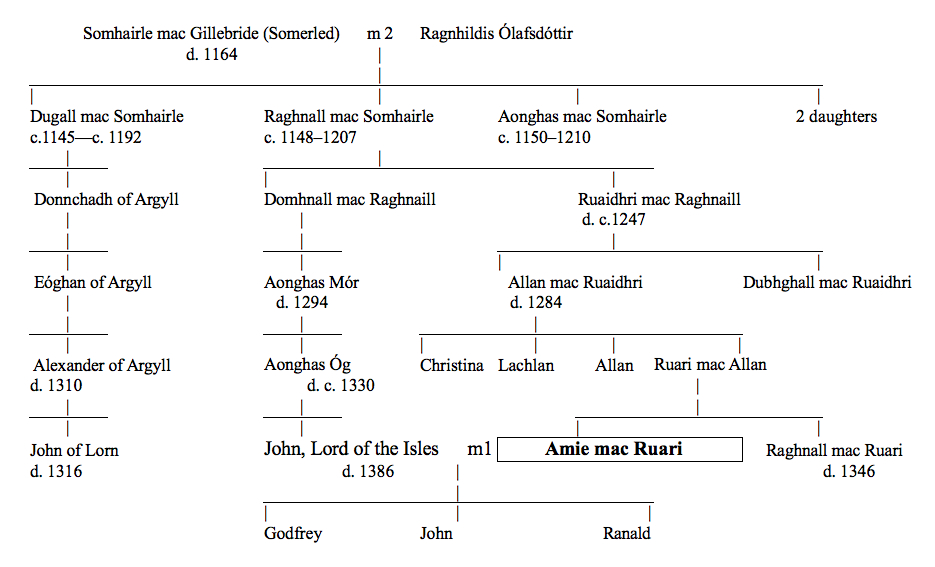
The descendants of Somerled, Amy being highlighted. On the left are the MacDougalls, on the right the MacRory, and in the middle the MacDonalds

Amie was a direct descendant of Somhairle mac Gille-Brighde (better known as Somerled), through her great-grandfather Ruaidhri mac Raghnaill, the founder of Mac Ruaidhri kindred.

Ruaidhri's son Ailean mac Ruaidhri possessed the "North Isles" of the Uists, and Benbecula. He is known to have attended Parliament in 1285 when the succession of Margaret, Maid of Norway was debated and to have added Barra to his lands in 1309. His illegitimate son Ruaidhri mac Ailein was Amie's father. (Note: According to one source Amie was the daughter of Ailean mac Ruaidhri and to another, Ailean was the son, not brother of Dubhghall mac Ruaidhri and thus Ruaidhri mac Raghnaill's grandson.)

When her distant cousin Alexander of Argyll's support of the opponents of King Robert the Bruce led to the forfeiture of his lands, they were distributed between Aonghas Óg of Islay and Ruaidhri mac Ailein. The latter received much of Lorne and parts of Lochaber and, through his sister Christina, Garmoran and the North Isles, including the Small Isles of Rùm and Eigg. (Note: Christina, Amie's aunt, succeeded to the estates of her father but resigned them to Ruari. According to Lee (1920) she married Domhnall I, Earl of Mar and was thus the grandmother of Robert II of Scotland. However, this is described as erroneous by MacDonald (2008), who states that "most sources agree" that she married Duncan, Domhnall I's second son, making her Robert I's sister-in-law.) Bruce was however careful to ensure his interests in the west were protected and Dunstaffnage Castle was given not to Ruari, now styled the "High Chief of Lorn" but to a royal constable, Arthur Campbell. Towards the close of the Bruce's reign, c. 1325, Ruaidhri mac Ailean was dispossessed for engaging in plots perceived to be against his king's interests. Amie and Ruaidhri also had a brother called Ailean (Alan), about whom little is known.

Edward Balliol may have restored these lands to Ruari's son and Amie's brother, Raghnall mac Ruaidhri, a state of affairs confirmed by David II c. 1344, who formally granted him Garmoran and the North Isles, although Lorn was retained by the crown and Lochaber in its entirety given to John of Islay, son of Aonghas Óg. Shortly thereafter, in October 1346, Raghnall was assassinated at Elcho Nunnery near Perth, as the result of a quarrel with Uilleam III, Earl of Ross. Raghnall was the "last chieftain of the MacRuaris" and Amie was his sole heir.

== Marriage, children and divorce ==
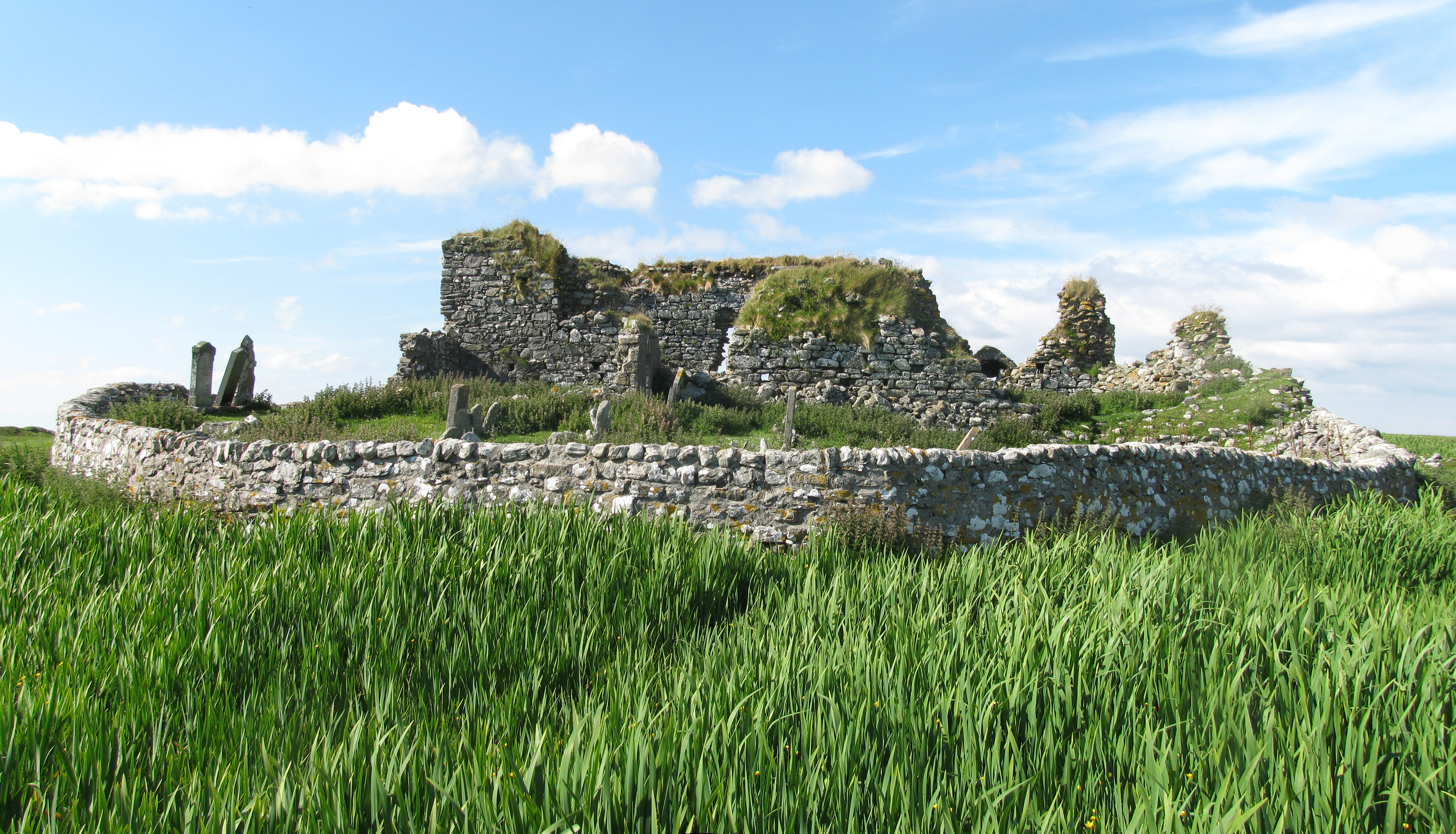
The ruins of Teampull na Trionaid, or Trinity Church, which was re-built by Amie in the later part of her life

John of Islay was also a descendant of Somerled via his father and thus a distant relative of Amie. By marrying this heiress to the Mac Ruaidhri lands he eventually controlled significant stretches of the western seaboard of Scotland from Morvern to Loch Hourn and the whole of the Hebrides save for Skye. The marriage took place in the 1330s, probably in 1337. From 1336 onwards John began to style himself Dominus Insularum—"Lord of the Isles", a title that implied a connection to the earlier Kings of Mann and the Isles and by extension a degree of independence from the Scottish crown. (Note: Hunter (2000) does not mention Amie by name, but refers to a Mac Ruaidhri "heiress".)

However, his ambitions were by no means quenched. He continued to build his power base by allying himself with Robert the High Steward of Scotland and the designated heir of King David. The marriage had by now produced three sons: John, Godfrey, Ranald, but John and Robert made an arrangement by which John divorced Amie and married Robert's daughter, Margaret Stewart. John is said to have obtained a papal dispensation for the divorce, which took place in 1350, just four years after Amie's inheritance. The Lord of the Isles now received Knapdale and Kintyre as a dowry but in return his sons by Amie were to be passed over in the succession in favour of any children by the marriage with Margaret.

== Later life ==
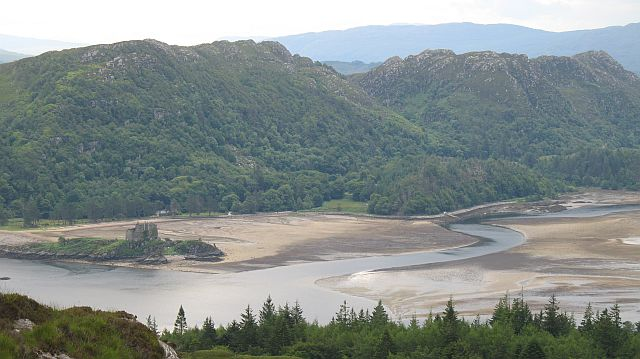
Castle Tioram in Loch Moidart

The "unvarying tradition" of the Gàidhealtachd recorded in the late 19th century was that Amie had given her husband no grounds for divorce and lived alone on her own estates until her death. The divorce annulled John of Islay's rights to her lands, although he managed to procure a royal charter to them in which her name is not even mentioned.

Amie was evidently of a pious disposition and built an oratory called Teampull Mhecael at the south-eastern point of Grimsay, and rebuilt the Teampul Chalumchille on Benbecula and the Trinity Church of North Uist. MacGibbon and Ross also attribute the building of the tower of Borve Castle, located to the south-west of the island of Benbecula, to Amie and dated the work to between 1344 and 1363. She is also said to have extended Castle Tioram in Moidart.

John of Islay kept to his agreement with Robert, now King in succession to David, and his children by Margaret inherited his title and the bulk of his lands. However Amie's son Ranald, who successfully petitioned for the return of much of the Mac Ruaidhri lands, including Garmoran and the North Isles, became the progenitor of Clan Macdonald of Clanranald and Clan MacDonell of Glengarry. (Note: One source states that Amie was the grandmother of John of Islay, Earl of Ross, but this seems unlikely.) Ranald acted as tutor to his younger half-brother Domhnall and was described as "old in the government of the Isles" on his father's death at Ardtornish Castle in 1386. He may have died in the same year, but the date of his mother's death is unknown.

The descendants of Godfrey, Amie and John's eldest son, who was titled Lord of Uist, were known as Siol Gorrie. In 1427, Alexander MacGorrie of Garmoran (also called Mac Ruaidhri), who may have been Godrey's son, is recorded as being the leader of 2,000 men. Not long afterwards he was imprisoned in Inverness and executed for sedition by King James I.
