= Loch Moidart =

Sea loch in the district of Moidart in the Scottish Highlands

Coordinates: 56.792°N 5.802°W

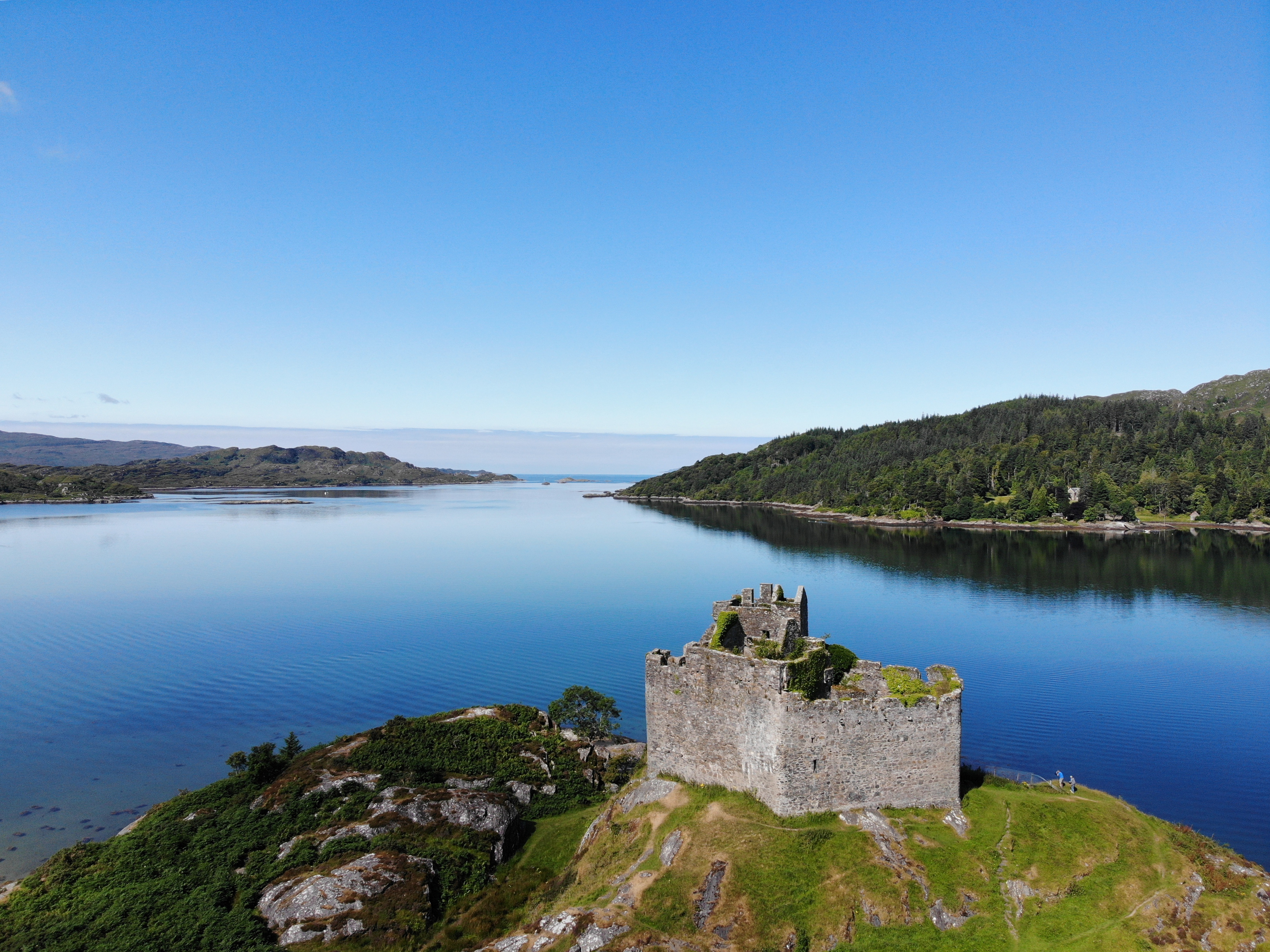
The South Channel of Loch Moidart, with Ardnamurchan on the left, Eilean Shona on the right, and Eilean Tioram in the foreground

19th-century chart of the loch

Loch Moidart is a sea loch in the district of Moidart in the Scottish Highlands. It lies on the west coast of Scotland, and runs about 8 km (5 miles) eastward from the sea. It is connected to the sea by two narrow channels lying on either side of the island of Eilean Shona, which itself is nearly split in two by a narrow isthmus. The River Moidart enters the loch at its head, near the hamlet of Ardmolich, while the River Shiel enters at the South Channel. Various views of the loch have featured as an Apple TV screensaver since 2021.

The A861 runs along the loch's northern shore; it is a remote circuitous route which connects to the A830 at both ends, without passing through any significant settlements.
