= Moidart =

District in The Rough Bounds, Scotland

Coordinates: 56.820°N 5.696°W

Moidart (/ˈmɔɪdɑːrt/ MOY-dart; Scottish Gaelic: Mùideart [ˈmuːitʲarˠʃt̪]) is an area in the Scottish Highlands. Part of the remote and isolated area of Scotland west of Fort William known as the Rough Bounds, Moidart is almost surrounded by bodies of water. Loch Shiel cuts off the eastern boundary of the district (along a south-south-west to north-north-east line) and continues along part of the southern edge. The remainder of the southern edge is cut off by Loch Moidart, and the north is cut off by Loch Morar and Loch Ailort.

Moidart is within the district of Lochaber, in the Highland council area. It includes the townships of Dorlin, Kinlochmoidart and Glenuig. At Dorlin is Castle Tioram, a former fortress of Clann Ruaidhrí and the Clanranald branch of Clan Donald.

Moidart forms part of the Morar, Moidart and Ardnamurchan National Scenic Area, one of 40 such areas in Scotland, which are defined so as to identify areas of exceptional scenery and to ensure its protection by restricting certain forms of development.

== History ==
=== Early history ===
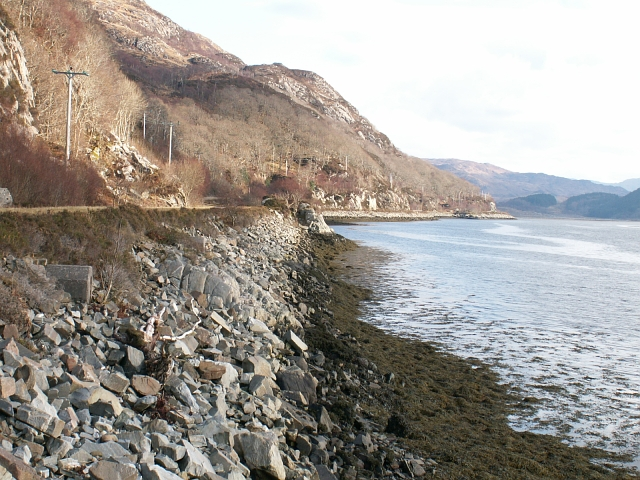
The muddy shore of Loch Moidart

Following raids by Vikings, Moidart became part of the Kingdom of the Isles, a Norwegian dependency. It was in this period that Moidart acquired its name, from the Old Norse mod, meaning mud, and the Norse suffix -art, derived from fjord; the whole name thus means muddy loch, and refers to Loch Moidart in particular (whose name is thus tautologous). In the late 11th century, Malcolm III of Scotland made a written agreement with Magnus Barelegs, the Norwegian king, which moved the border to the coast; Moidart thus became Scottish.

In the early 12th century, Somerled, a Norse-Gael of uncertain origin, came into possession of Moidart and the surrounding region; no reliable record explains how this happened, but at some point in the 1140s, David I of Scotland's control of the region had been eroded. In the early part of the century, in the 1130s, Somerled launched a coup in the Kingdom of the Isles, which resulted in that kingdom joining his other possessions, as a single independent state. Upon Somerled's death, Norwegian authority was restored, but in practice, the kingdom was divided; the portion containing Moidart was known as Garmoran, and ruled by the MacRory, a faction among Somerled's heirs.

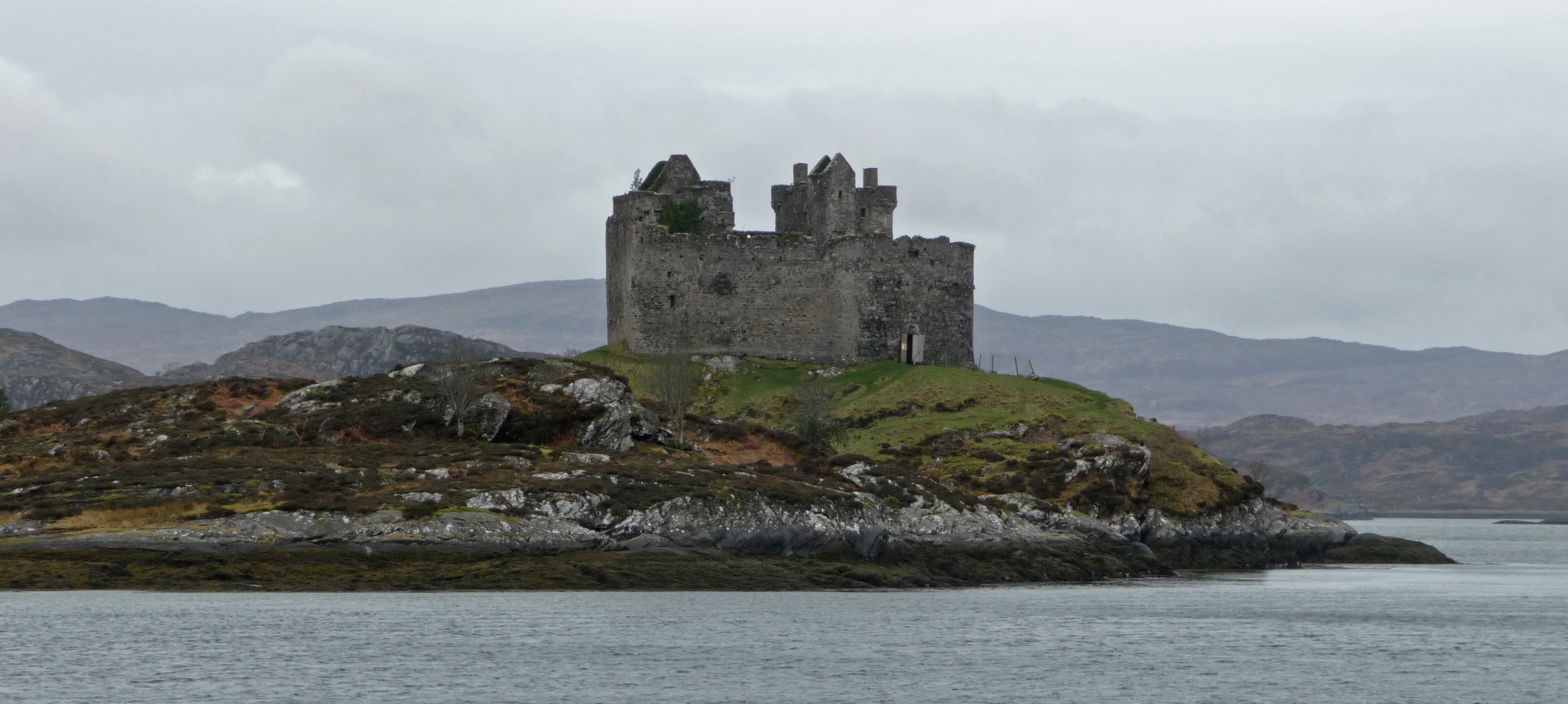
Castle Tioram

Following the 1266 Treaty of Perth, Garmoran became a Scottish crown dependency – the Lordship of Garmoran, still ruled by the MacRory, until the sole MacRory heir was Amy of Garmoran. At around this time, Castle Tioram was built, in Loch Moidart, as the principal seat of the Lordship of Garmoran. Most of the remainder of the Kingdom of the Isles had become the Lordship of the Isles, ruled by the MacDonalds, whose leader, John of Islay, married Amy. After the birth of three sons, he divorced Amy and married the king's niece, in return for a substantial dowry.

As part of the arrangement, John deprived his eldest son, Ranald, of the ability to inherit the Lordship of the Isles, in favour of a son by his new wife; as compensation, he made Ranald the Lord of Garmoran.

At the end of the 14th century, upon Ranald's death, his sons were still children, and Ranald's younger brother Godfrey took the opportunity to seize the Lordship of Garmoran. Also, the heirs of Ranald's other brother Murdoch Stewart now made their own claim. This involved Godfrey's family (the Siol Gorrie) and those of his brothers in a violent conflict, although it is not well-described in surviving records.

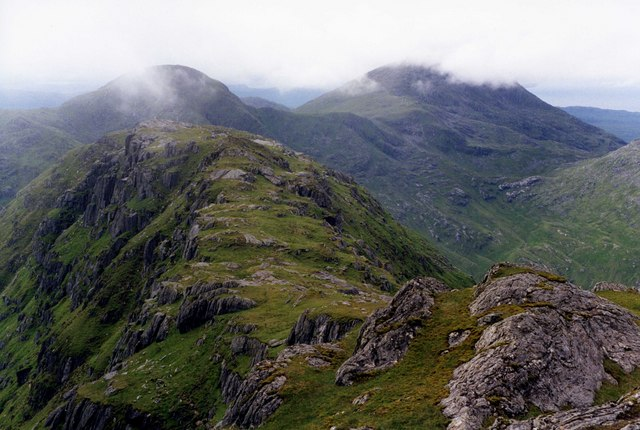
North central Moidart

In 1427, frustrated with the level of violence generally in the highlands, together with the insurrection caused by his cousin Murdoch Stewart, King James I demanded that highland magnates should attend a meeting at Inverness. Upon arrival, many of the leaders were seized and imprisoned. Alexander MacGorrie, son of Godfrey, was considered to be one of the two most reprehensible, and after a quick showtrial, he was executed. As Alexander had by now inherited Godfrey's de facto position as Lord of Garmoran, and in view of Ranald's heirs being no less responsible for the violence, King James declared the Lordship forfeit.

=== Lairdship grants ===
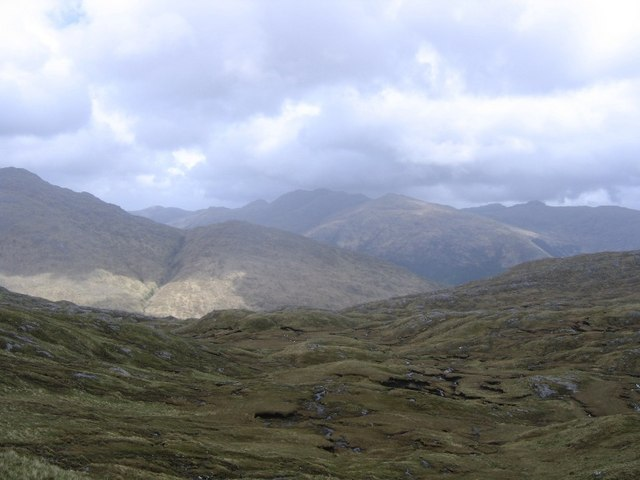
Moidart Bog

In 1469, James' grandson (James III) granted Lairdship of the lands of Garmoran and Uist to John, the Lord of the Isles. In turn, John passed it to his own half-brother, Hugh of Sleat; the grant to Hugh was confirmed by the king in a 1493 charter. The violence that led to Alexander's execution had brought the Siol Gorrie to the brink of extinction, and after Alexander's death they played no further part in Moidart's history.

Ranald's heirs (Clan Ranald) disputed and fought against the charter. Following Hugh of Sleat's death, in 1498, and for reasons that are not remotely clear, his son John immediately resigned, transferring all authority to the king. In 1532, the king granted Moidart to the leader of Clan Ranald, John Moidartach. The charter granting him the lands also acknowledged his ownership of the lands of his former uncle, Ranald Bane, who had been granted the adjacent lands of Arisaig some 30 years earlier.

In 1609, following a degree of lawlessness in the region, John's grandson Donald was imprisoned. Donald was only released on condition of being obedient to the king, James VI, and the king's law; in return, James granted Donald a second charter to his lands.

=== Later history ===
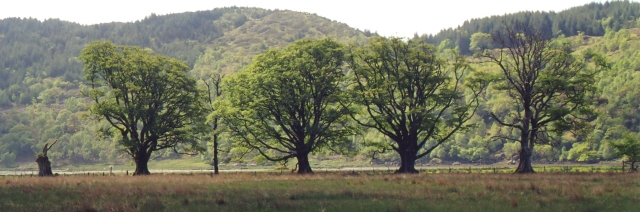
The Seven Men of Moidart

The Rough Bounds became a hotbed of Jacobite sympathy. Following the failure of the Jacobite rising of 1745, it was the last part of Scotland in which Bonnie Prince Charlie found sanctuary. Finally leaving Scotland from Loch nan Uamh, he took seven prominent men with him, who despite their places of origin became known as the Seven Men of Moidart (the Second Duke of Atholl, Aeneas MacDonald – brother of the local Laird, Francis Strickland – an aristocratic English Recusant, George Kelly – Irish Presbyterian minister, and three officers from the French Royal Army's Irish Brigade); a commemorative row of beech trees was planted a century later.

In an April 1787 letter from Moidart to the Congregation for Propaganda in Rome, Fr. Austin MacDonald wrote, "On account of the emigration of the people of Knoydart to Canada, along with their priest; it fell to me in the autumn to attend to those who were left behind, and during the winter to the people of Moydart (sic) as well. Although not less than 600 Catholics went to America, still I administered the Sacraments to over 500 souls who remained. The overpopulation of these districts, together with the oppression of the landlords, are the principal causes of the departure of so many, not only among the Catholics, but also among the Protestants."

Unlike many other areas of Jacobite sympathy, no attempt was made to establish a military road into Moidart, and it remained without road access until the A861 was built, in 1966 (after receiving approval in 1963). Prior to that, other than a rough footpath, it could only be accessed by a ferry running between Lochailort (at the north of Moidart) and Glenuig (in the west). It wasn't until 1988 that it became possible for residents to have a connection to the mains electricity supply.

The remoteness ensured the persistence both of Catholicism, despite the Scottish Reformation, and of the Gaelic language. The area remained strongly Gaelic-speaking until the mid 20th century – in the 1881 census, around 90% of the population were able to speak Gaelic and over a third unable to speak English, though by 2001 the share of Gaelic speakers had declined to under 15% of habitual residents.

The lack of connectivity before the 1960s also made the area an ideal training location for special operational units during World War II. Several SOE paramilitary training bases were sited in the area, and HMS Dorlin was established at Dorlin, and used for training of Royal Navy Beach Signals and Royal Signals sections.

== Famous people ==
- Alasdair mac Mhaighstir Alasdair, 18th century Scottish Gaelic poet and Jacobite
- Fergie MacDonald was raised in the area.

== Sources ==
- Rev. Charles Macdonald, Moidart, or among the Clanranalds (1889)
