= Castle Tioram =

Ruined castle in Loch Moidart, Scotland

Coordinates: 56°47′6″N 5°49′39″W

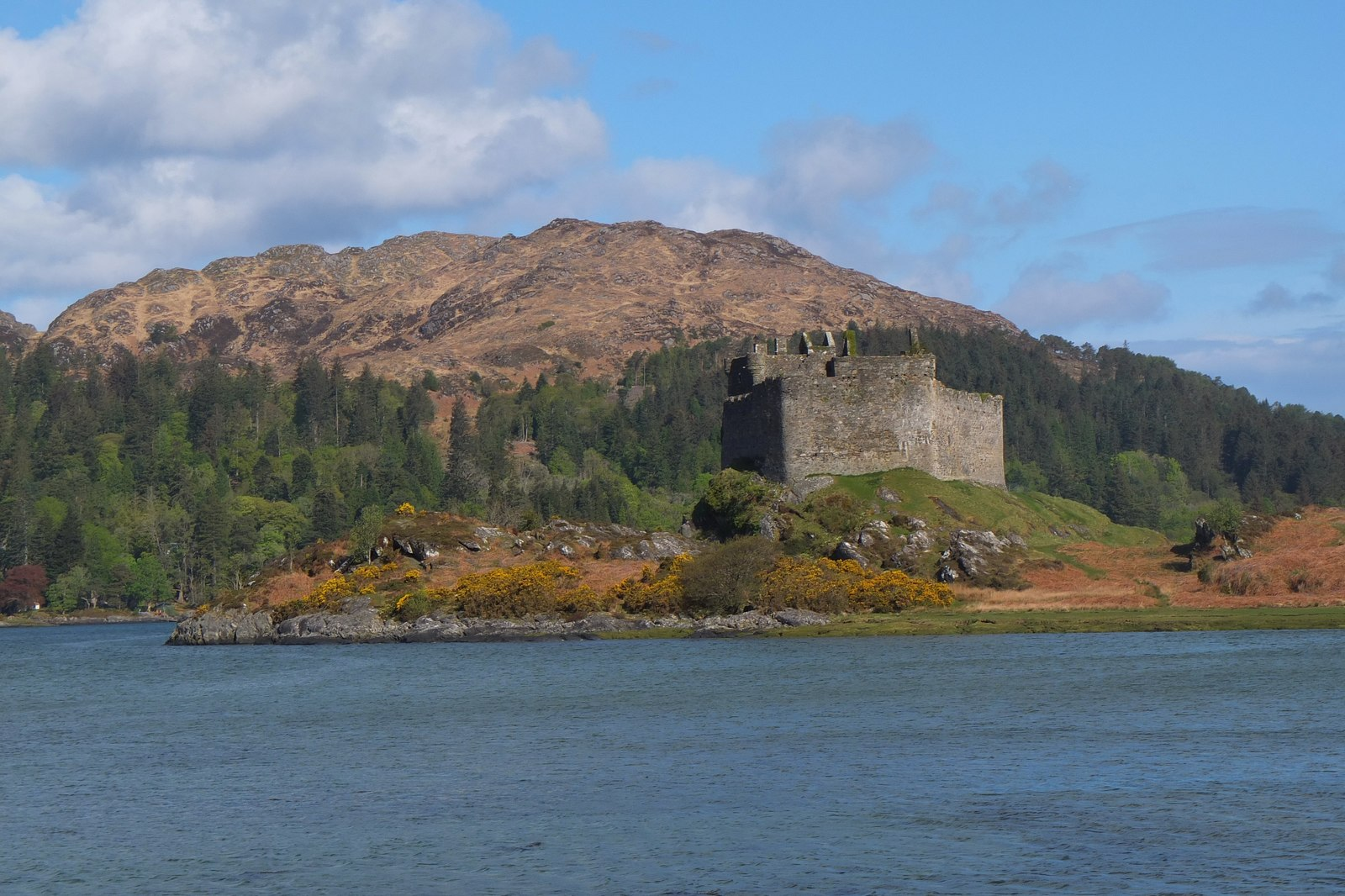
View of the castle with Eilean Shona in the background

Castle Tioram (/ˈtʃiːrəm/; Scottish Gaelic: Caisteal Tioram, meaning "dry castle") is a ruined castle that sits on the tidal island Eilean Tioram in Loch Moidart, Scotland. It is north of Acharacle, approximately 80 km (50 mi) west of Fort William. Though hidden from the sea, the castle controls access to Loch Shiel. It is also known locally as Dorlin Castle. The castle is a scheduled monument.

== History ==
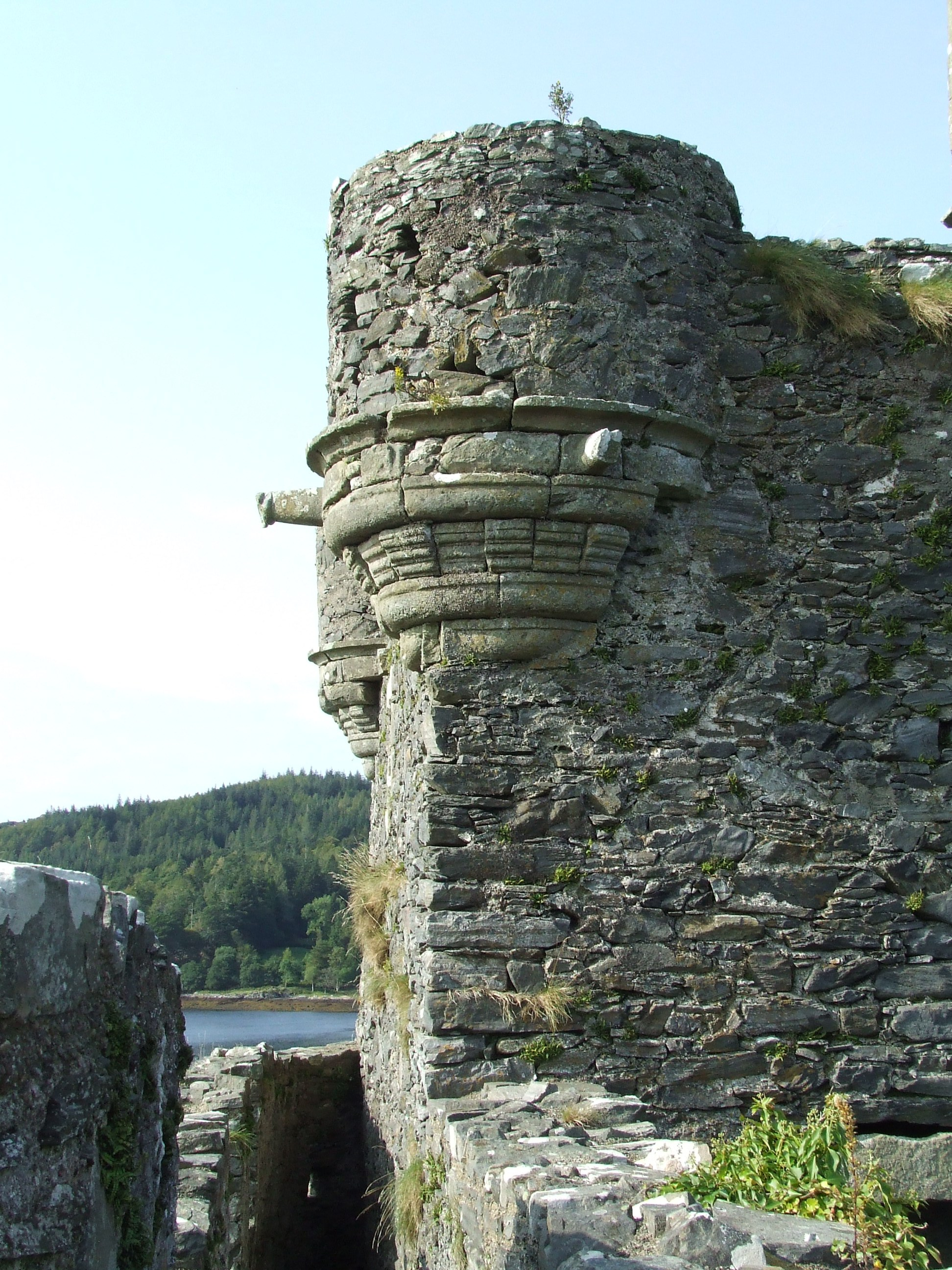
The battlements

Castle Tioram was one of Somerled's castles in his time (the 12th century), though some may date it from the 13th or 14th century. It appears to have originally been a principal stronghold of Clann Ruaidhrí. Eilean Tioram, the island the fortress sits upon, is first recorded in a charter of Cairistíona Nic Ruaidhrí, daughter of Ailéan mac Ruaidhrí. According to early modern tradition, preserved by the 17th-century Sleat History, the castle was erected by Ailéan's granddaughter, Áine Nic Ruaidhrí. The castle certainly served as the seat of the latter's Clann Raghnaill descendants for centuries.

As such, Castle Tioram is the traditional seat of the Clanranald (Clann Raghnaill) branch of Clan Donald. The castle was seized by Government forces in around 1692 when the clan chief Allan Macdonald of Clanranald joined the exiled court of James VII and II in France, despite having sworn allegiance to William III and II and Mary II. A small garrison was stationed in the castle until the Jacobite rising of 1715 when Allan recaptured and torched it, purportedly to keep it out of the hands of Hanoverian forces. It has been unoccupied since that time, although there are some accounts suggesting it was partially inhabited thereafter including for the storage of firearms from the De Tuillay in the 1745 Jacobite uprising and Lady Grange's account of her kidnapping.

=== Restoration proposals ===
Proposals to restore the castle by the new owners, Anta Estates, were announced in 1997 and received planning consent from Highland Council. This included the creation of a clan centre/museum, domestic apartments, and some public access. However, Historic Scotland refused Scheduled Monument Consent, a decision upheld after a local public inquiry.

The Council issued a Dangerous Buildings Order closing the castle to the public in 1998 due to its poor condition. The main structure was found to be "inherently strong" but a report concluded "that without major consolidation work the risk of further collapse in five to 10 years was significant". A significant collapse, comprising several square metres of the outer layer of the northwest curtain wall, occurred in 2000 and was repaired by the owners. A condition report in September 2014 found that there had been no significant change in the stonework since then.

The Royal Commission on the Ancient and Historical Monuments of Scotland, now part of Historic Environment Scotland, holds a substantial archive of research information, drawings, and photographs lodged by the current owners.

== Eilean Tioram ==
The castle can be reached on foot across the tidal causeway, but there is no access to the interior because of the risk of falling masonry. Eilean Tioram is one of 17 tidal islands that can be walked to from the Scottish mainland.

== In popular culture ==
The castle can be seen in an opening aerial montage of the Highlander: The Series fourth season episode, "Homeland".

== See also ==
- List of islands of Scotland
- Castles in Scotland
- Medieval fortification
