= Ailéan mac Ruaidhrí =

Scottish magnate (d. ~1296)

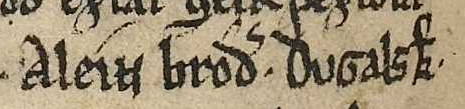
- The names of Ailéan and his brother, Dubhghall, as they appear on folio 122v of AM 45 fol (Codex Frisianus): "Aleinn broðir Dvggals konvngs". The excerpt notes the brothers' kinship and styles Dubhghall a king.
- Died: ×1296
- Noble family: Clann Ruaidhrí (Clann Somhairle)
- Spouse: Isabella
- Issue: Lachlann, Ruaidhrí, and Cairistíona
- Father: Ruaidhrí mac Raghnaill

Ailéan mac Ruaidhrí (died ×1296) was a leading figure in the thirteenth-century kingdoms of the Isles and the Scotland. (Note: Since the 1970s, academics have accorded Ailéan various patronymic names in English secondary sources: Ailín MacRory, Alain mac Ruaidrí, Alan mac Ruaidhri, Alan Mac Ruaidhri, Alan mac Ruaidri, Alan Mac Ruaidrí, Alan mac Ruairi, Alan mac Ruari, Alan Mac Sorley, Alan MacRuadrí, Alan MacRuadri, Alan Macruaidhri, Alan MacRuairi, Alan MacRuairidh, Alan Macruari, Alan macRuari, Alan MacRuaridh, Alan Macruarie, Aleinn mac Ruaidhrí, and Allan mac Ruairi.) He was a son of Ruaidhrí mac Raghnaill, and thus a member of the Clann Ruaidhrí branch of Clann Somhairle. Ailéan was a brother of Dubhghall mac Ruaidhrí, King of Argyll and the Isles, a significant figure who held power in the mid thirteenth century. At the time, the rulers of the Isles were fiercely independent of the Scottish Crown, and owed nominal allegiance to the distant Norwegian Crown. In 1259, Dubhghall's daughter married the son of King of Connacht, and Ailéan is recorded to have commanded the woman's tocher of one hundred and sixty gallowglass warriors.

When the Scottish Crown encroached into Isles in the 1260s, Dubhghall and Ailéan were noted supporters of the Norwegian cause. Both men played a prominent role in the Norwegian campaign against the Scots in 1263. Following the collapse of the operation and further pressure, the Norwegians agreed to hand the Isles over to the Scots. Although Dubhghall is last attested resisting the Scots later that decade, Ailéan and most of his Clann Somhairle kinsman integrated themselves into the Scottish realm. The record of his part in the ruthless suppression of a Manx revolt in 1275, and his participation in a parliamentary council concerning the inheritance of Scottish throne in 1284, both evidence the incorporation of Clann Somhairle into the kingdom.

== Clann Ruaidhrí ==
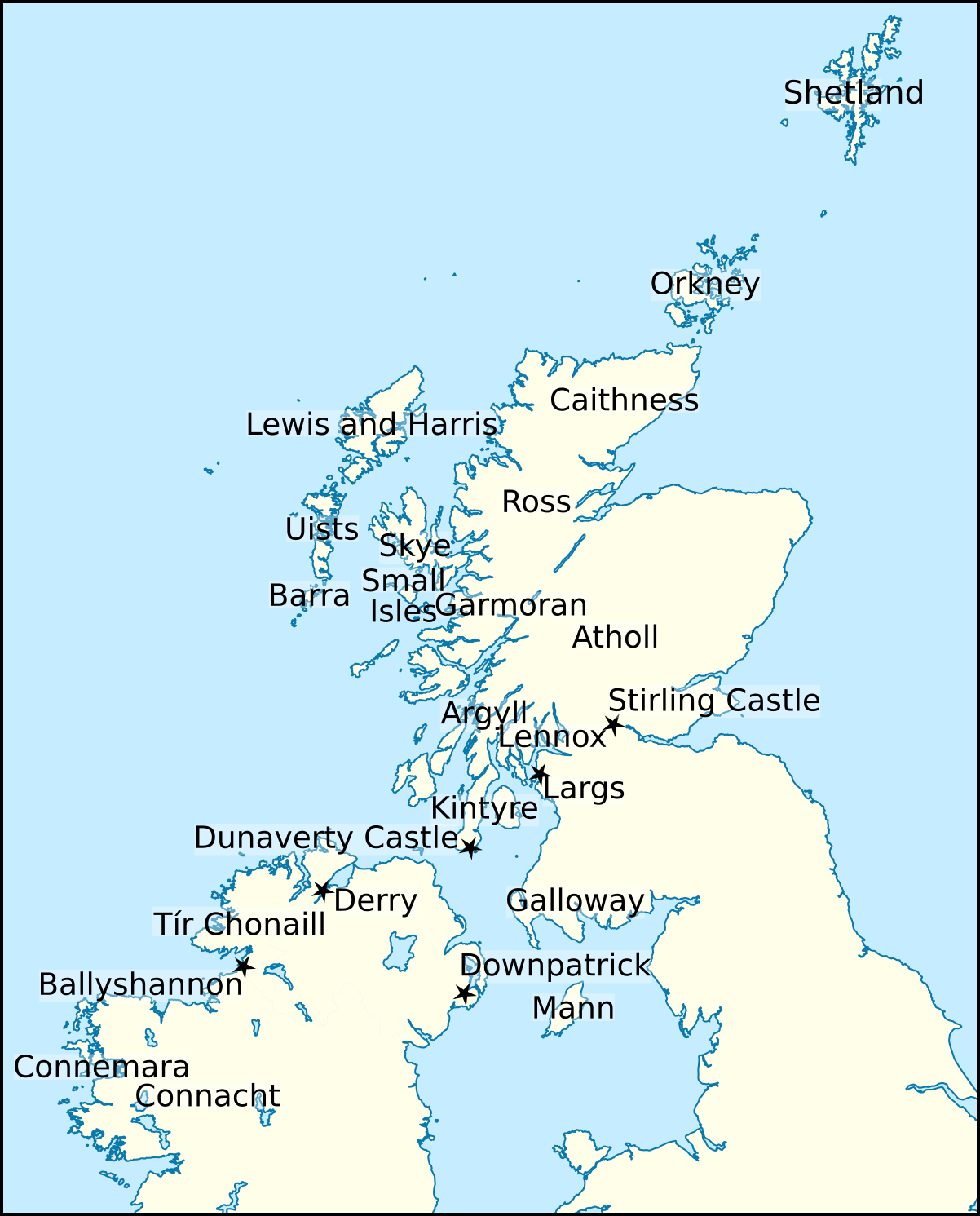
Locations relating to the life and times of Ailéan.

Ailéan and his brother, Dubhghall, were sons of Ruaidhrí mac Raghnaill, Lord of Kintyre. The latter was the eponym of Clann Ruaidhrí, a branch of the Clann Somhairle kindred. In the second decade of the thirteenth-century, Ruaidhrí is known to have conducted military operations in Ireland with Thomas fitz Roland, Earl of Atholl, younger brother of Alan fitz Roland, Lord of Galloway. The close relations between these families could account for Ailéan's name. (Note: The father of Alan and Thomas was Roland fitz Uhtred, Lord of Galloway. Roland's acceptance of Alan as the name of his eldest son and heir could be evidence of French influence upon his family. In the twelfth century the family increasingly involved itself with families of Continental origin.)

In 1247, a certain Mac Somhairle—perhaps Ruaidhrí himself—was killed whilst resisting an English invasion of Tír Chonaill. The following year, Ailéan's brother and Eóghan Mac Dubhghaill, a Clann Somhairle kinsman, travelled to Norway, with both men seeking kingship of the northern Suðreyjar from Hákon Hákonarson, King of Norway. Although the entirety of the Suðreyjar roughly encompassed the Hebrides and Mann, the precise jurisdiction which Dubhghall and Eóghan competed for is uncertain. For example, the northern Hebridean islands of Lewis and Harris and Skye appear to have been held by the Crovan dynasty, then represented by the reigning Haraldr Óláfsson, King of Mann and the Isles. It is conceivable that Eóghan and Dubhghall sought kingship over the same jurisdiction that Hákon had awarded to Óspakr-Hákon about a decade before—a region which could have included some or all of the islands possessed by Clann Somhairle. In fact, it is possible that the aforesaid events of 1247 and 1248 were related, and that Dubhghall and Eóghan sought to succeed Mac Somhairle's position in the Isles.

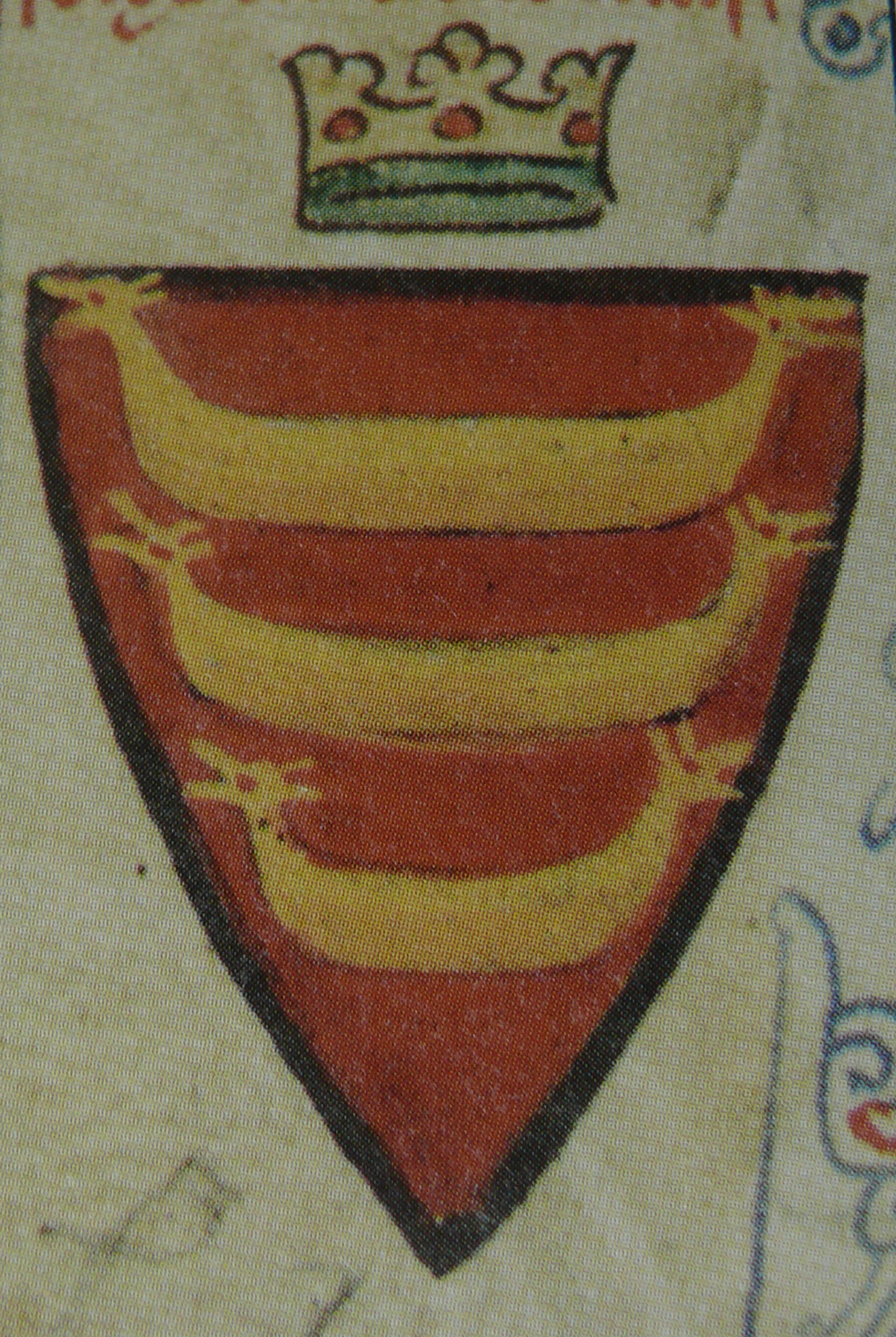
Coat of arms of Hákon Hákonarson as depicted on folio 216v of Cambridge Corpus Christi College Parker Library 16II (Chronica Majora). (Note: The coat of arms is blazoned: gules, three galleys with dragon heads at each end or, one above the other. The coat of arms concerns Hákon's coronation, and its associated caption reads in Latin: "Scutum regis Norwagiae nuper coronati, qui dicitur rex Insularum". The coat of arms was illustrated by Matthew Paris, a man who met Hákon in 1248/1249, the year after the king's coronation. The emphasise that Matthew placed upon the Norwegian realm's sea power appears to be underscored in the heraldry he attributed to Hákon.)

It was only after the unexpected death of Haraldr in 1248 that Hákon sent Eóghan west-over-sea to temporarily take up the kingship of the Isles on his behalf. Eóghan, however, was not only a Norwegian dependant in the Isles, but an eminent Scottish magnate on the mainland. Although the Scottish Crown appears to have attempted to purchase the Isles earlier that decade, Eóghan's acceptance of Hákon's commission partly led Alexander II, King of Scotland to unleash an invasion of Argyll in the summer of 1249, directed at the very heart of the Clann Dubhghaill lordship. The unfolding crisis only ended with the Scottish king's sudden death in July 1249.

Eóghan appears to have been utterly dispossessed by the Scots a result of their invasion. In fact, his apparent displacement could well have upended the hierarchy of Clann Somhairle. For instance, a particular entry preserved by the Icelandic annals states that, within the very year that Eóghan was forced from Argyll by the Scots, Dubhghall himself "took kingship" in the Isles. This record could reveal that Dubhghall and Eóghan shared kingship in the Hebrides, or that Dubhghall assumed the kingship from a severely weakened Eóghan.

== Gallowglass warlord ==
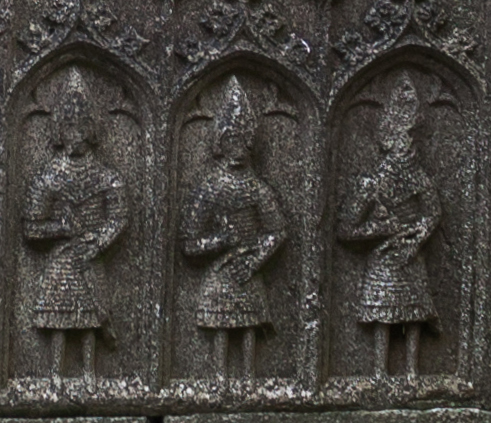
Fifteenth-century sculpted figures of gallowglasses, as depicted upon the apparent effigy of Feidhlimidh Ó Conchobhair, father of Aodh na nGall, the husband of Ailéan's niece.

In 1258, Ailéan's brother conducted military operations against the English in Connacht. Within the same year, there was an extraordinary assembly conducted between Aodh na nGall Ó Conchobhair, Tadhg Ó Briain, and Brian Ó Néill, King of Tír Eoghain. It was at this convention, at Caol Uisce on the River Erne, that Aodh—son of the King of Connacht—and Tadhg—son of the King of Thomond—relinquished their claims to the high-kingship of Ireland in favour of Brian, who was then proclaimed high king. The latter was then in midst of campaigning against a temporarily weakened English Earldom of Ulster, and closely allied with Aodh in his cause.

The following year, the fifteenth- to sixteenth-century Annals of Connacht, the sixteenth-century Annals of Loch Cé, and the seventeenth-century Annals of the Four Masters reveal that Aodh travelled to Derry and married a daughter of Dubhghall, and thereby received a tocher that included one hundred and sixty gallowglass warriors commanded by Ailéan himself. Ailéan is, therefore, one of the earliest known warriors of this type. (Note: This tocher seems to be similar to that attributed to the bride of Dubhghall's later kinsman, Aonghus Óg Mac Domhnaill. According to Hebridean tradition preserved by the eighteenth-century Book of Clanranald and the seventeenth-century Sleat History, the latter's bride, Áine Ní Chatháin, was accompanied to her husband by a remarkable retinue of Irishmen. The first recorded instance of the term "gallowglass" (gallóglach) concerns events dated 1290. Although the aforesaid sources documenting the marriage of Dubhghall's daughter do not specifically identify the warriors as gallowglasses, they are in fact called óglaigh, a term that seems to refer to gallowglasses in this particular instance.) The marital alliance was conducted at the main port within Brian's realm, a site indicating that the union—along with the aforesaid assembly and naval operations of the previous year—was part of a carefully coordinated plan to tackle English power in the north west of Ireland.

Unequal combat did they join,
the Foreigners and the Irish of Tara:
there were shirts of thin satin about the Sons of Conn
and the Foreigners were a single phalanx of iron.

— excerpt from Aoidhe mo chroidhe ceann Briain, by Giolla Brighde Mac Con Midhe, recounting the destruction of the lightly-armed Irish forces at Downpatrick in 1260.

Unfortunately for these confederates, Tadhg was dead by 1259, and the combined forces of Aodh and Brian were utterly crushed in battle at Downpatrick in 1260, with Brian amongst the slain. Despite this catastrophe, the phenomenon of eminent Irish lords importing heavily armed mercenaries from the Isles and western Scotland became more prevalent in the later part of the century, and helped to even the military superiority enjoyed by English forces over native Irish troops. Generally, English knights were superior to comparatively lightly armed Irish horsemen. Gallowglasses fought in formations fashioned to counteract the devastating charge of such knights. The Clann Ruaidhrí dowry of these warriors may well have fought at the aforesaid battle at Downpatrick, although the fact that Brian's forces were defeated by local English levies lends little evidence to their capabilities. Ailéan's position at the head of such a unit may well have been similar to that of Mac Somhairle, who could well have led gallowglasses at the time of his death.

== Norwegian magnate ==
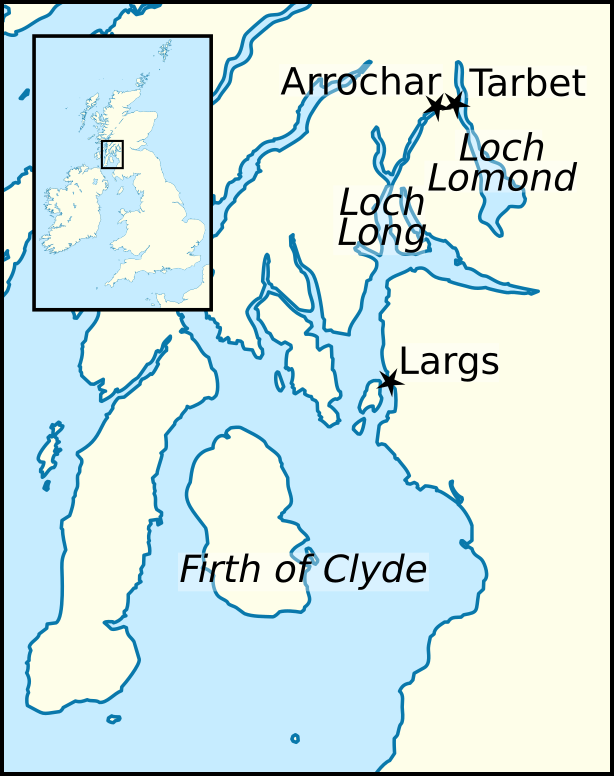
Locations relating to the expedition into the Lennox.

With the aforesaid death of Alexander II in 1249, the Scottish invasion of the Argyll and the Isles came to an abrupt end. About a decade later, the latter's son and royal successor, Alexander III, came of age and took steps to continue his father's westward expansion. In 1262, the year after yet another failed attempt by the Scottish Crown to purchase the Isles, the thirteenth-century Hákonar saga Hákonarsonar reports that the Scots lashed out against the Islesmen in a particularly savage attack upon the inhabitants of Skye. Thus provoked, Hákon assembled an enormous fleet—described by the Icelandic annals as the largest force to have ever set sail from Norway—to reassert Norwegian sovereignty along the north and western coast of Scotland. (Note: Specifically, in the words of the saga's compiler, Hákon intended to "avenge the warfare that the Scots had made in his dominions".) In July 1263, this armada disembarked from Norway, and by mid August, Hákon reaffirmed his overlordship in Shetland and Orkney, forced the submission of Caithness, and arrived in the Hebrides.

The mind-strong men intensified military campaigns far and wide in the large settlements of the gloomy wolf-feeder. The battle-brave Alan gave people not seldom a slayer of life's duration by battle-destruction.

— excerpt from Hrafnsmál, by Sturla Þórðarson, exalting Ailéan's foraying against the Scots.

In early September, Hákon's fleet of Norwegians and Islesmen entered the Firth of Clyde. When negotiations between the Scottish and Norwegian administrations broke down, the saga identifies Magnús Óláfsson, King of Mann and the Isles, Dubhghall, Ailéan, Aonghus Mór Mac Domhnaill, and Murchadh Mac Suibhne, as the commanders of a detachment of Islesmen and Norwegians who entered Loch Long, portaged across land into Loch Lomond, and ravaged the surrounding region of the Lennox. (Note: The saga reveals that the fleet portaged the approximately a 2.5 kilometres (1.6 mi) distance between Arrochar to Tarbet. Although the placename Tarbet is variously stated to mean as "place of portage", this claim may be influenced by the saga's account of the expedition, and the place name actually means "isthmus".) According various versions of the saga, this contingent consisted of either forty or sixty ships—a considerable portion of Hákon's fleet.

Ailéan's actions are specifically acclaimed by the saga, which states that he took several hundred head of cattle, and caused much destruction throughout mainland Scotland. This inland campaigning appears to be corroborated by Scottish exchequer records, as John Lamberton, Sheriff of Stirling is reported to have incurred expenses for the upkeep of "vigilant men" at Stirling Castle for the time when the Norwegian forces were in the area. There is reason to suspect that the operation in Loch Lomond is evidence that the Norwegians and Islesmen were directing their fury at the territories of the Stewarts. Furthermore, by penetrating into the Earldom of Lennox, and possibly striking further east inland, Hákon's adherents would have been encroaching into the Earldom of Menteith. (Note: The Stewarts and the comital family of Lennox were allied in marriage, as Maol Domhnaich, Earl of Lennox was married to Elizabeth Stewart, sister of Walter Stewart, Earl of Menteith.)

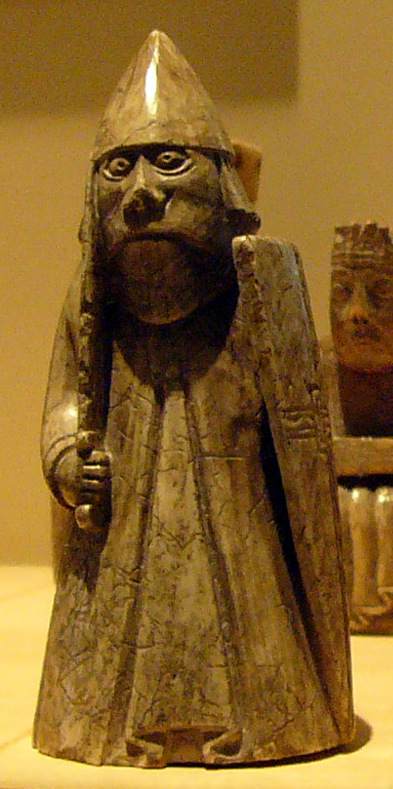
One of the rook gaming pieces of the so-called Lewis chessmen. The Scandinavian connections of leading members of the Isles may have been reflected in their military armament, and could have resembled that depicted upon such gaming pieces.

Meanwhile, at the beginning of October, Hákon's main force clashed with the Scots at Largs, and withdrew into the Hebrides. Once regrouped with the detachment of Islesmen, the saga records that Hákon rewarded his overseas supporters. Since Eóghan had refused to aid the Norwegians cause, Dubhghall and Ailéan were awarded his forfeited island territories. A certain Ruðri (fl. 1263) is stated to have received Bute, whilst Murchadh got Arran. (Note: Ruðri may have been a descendant of Óspakr-Hákon, or of Ailéan's father, Ruaidhrí.)

Although the saga declares that the operation was an overwhelming triumph, it seems to have been an utter failure instead. Not only did Hákon fail to break Scottish power, but Alexander III seized the initiative the following year, and oversaw a series of invasions into the Isles and northern Scotland. Recognising this dramatic shift in royal authority, Magnús Óláfsson submitted to Alexander III within the year, and in so doing, symbolised the complete collapse of Norwegian sovereignty in the Isles. Dubhghall, on the other hand, contrasted many of his compatriots from the Isles, and stubbornly refused to submit to the Scottish Crown. In 1266, almost three years after Hákon's abortive campaign, terms of peace were finally agreed upon between the Scottish and Norwegian administrations. Specifically, with the conclusion of the Treaty of Perth in July, Hákon's son and successor, Magnús Hákonarson, King of Norway, formally resigned all rights to Mann and the islands on the western coast of Scotland. In so doing, the territorial dispute over Scotland's western maritime region was finally settled.

== Scottish magnate ==
In the wake of the Scots' acquisition of the Isles, and Dubhghall's death within the decade, Clann Ruaidhrí disappears from the Scottish historical record. When the kindred finally reemerges in 1275, it is in the person of Ailéan himself, by then a prominent Scottish magnate, and representative of Clann Ruaidhrí. That year, the continuation of the twelfth-century Historia rerum Anglicarum, thirteenth- to fourteenth-century Chronicle of Mann, and the fourteenth-century Chronicle of Lanercost reveal that Guðrøðr, illegitimate son of Magnús Óláfsson, led a revolt on Mann against the Scottish Crown. Alexander III responded by sending a massive fleet, drawn from the Hebrides and Galloway, to invade the island and restore Scottish royal authority. Of the recorded commanders, the continuation of Historia rerum Anglicarum reveals that two were members of Clann Somhairle: Alasdair Mac Dubhghaill, Lord of Argyll, and Ailéan himself. (Note: The annal-entry records Ailéan's name in Latin as "Alanus filius Rotheri". Alasdair first appears on record in 1275. The expedition was evidently personal for him, as his sister was the widow of Guðrøðr's father.) These two would have almost certainty been responsible for supplying and leading the host from the Hebrides and Argyll, and may have provided the fleet that transported the Scottish forces to Mann. According to aforesaid sources, the Scots ruthlessly routed the rebels. Despite the apparent ease at which the Manx were suppressed, the revolt clearly represented a grave threat to Scottish authority, as evidenced by the magnitude of the Scots' response. In fact, the Clann Somhairle dimension to this campaign, as agents of the Scottish Crown's authority, clearly exemplifies the extent at which the kindred had been incorporated into Scottish realm.

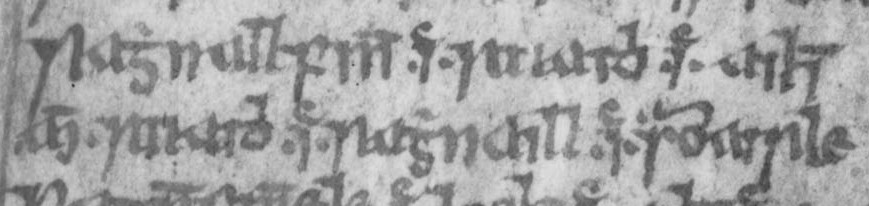
An excerpt from National Library of Scotland Advocates' 72.1.1 (MS 1467) showing a pedigree of Clann Ruaidhrí concerning descendants of Ailéan. The lineage runs: "Raghnall finn mac ruaidri mhic ailin mhic ruaidri mhic raghnaill mhic shomairle".

Western magnates like Ailéan were rarely present at the Scottish royal court, although on certain occasions they participated in important affairs of state. For instance, in 1284, Ailéan was one of the many such men who attended a government council at Scone which acknowledged Margaret, granddaughter of Alexander III, as the king's rightful heir. The inclusion of Ailéan, and two of his Clann Somhairle kinsmen—the aforesaid Alasdair and Aonghus Mór—further illustrates the kindred's incorporation within the Scottish realm. (Note: The three are the last magnates to be listed in the order documenting their attendance.)

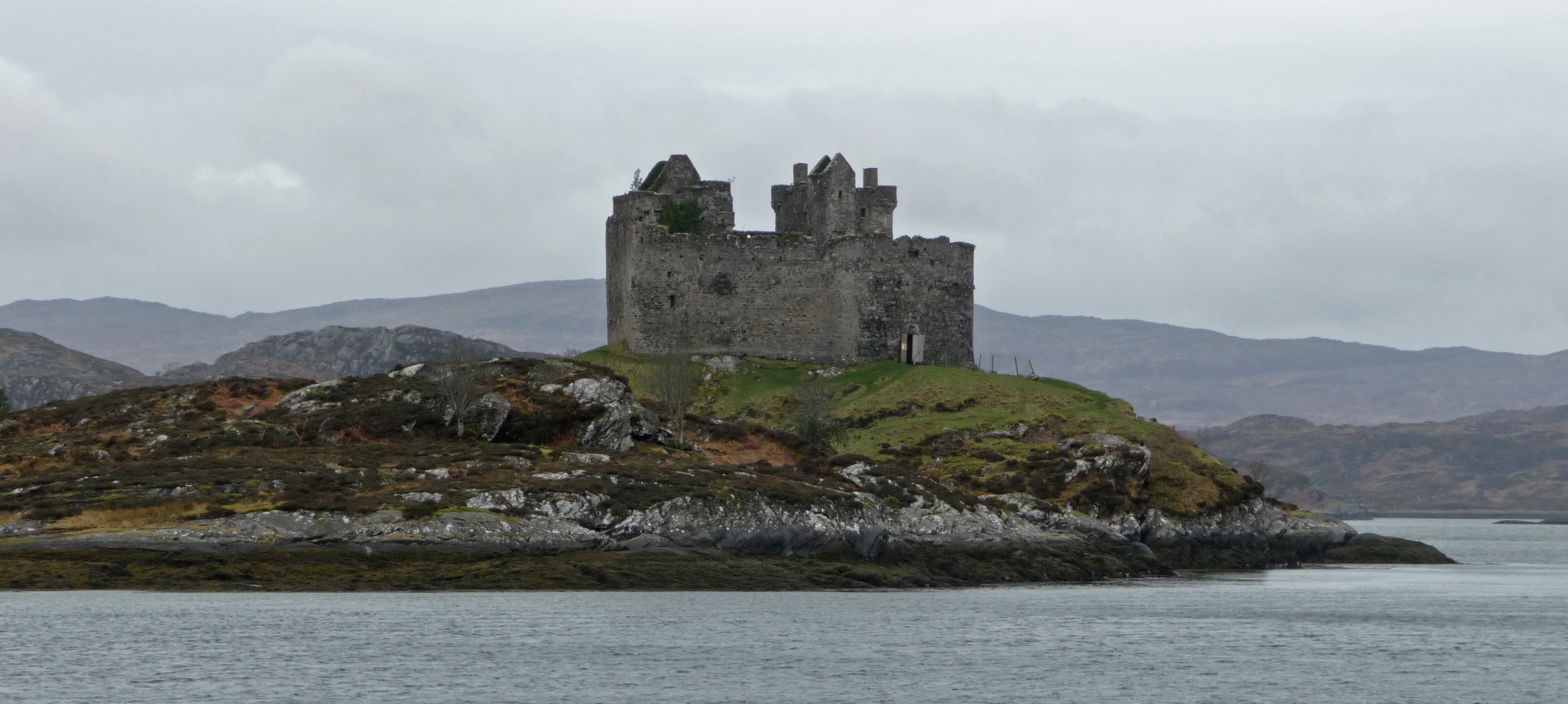
Now-ruinous Castle Tioram may well have been a Clann Ruaidhrí stronghold. The island the fortress sits upon is first recorded in a charter of Ailéan's daughter, Cairistíona. According to early modern tradition, the castle was erected by his granddaughter, Áine Nic Ruaidhrí in the fourteenth century. The castle served as the seat of the latter's Clann Domhnaill descendants the next four hundred years.

Although it is possible that Dubhghall's power base had been located in Garmoran and perhaps Uist, there is uncertainty as to how and when these territories entered into the possession of his family. Later leading members of Clann Ruaidhrí certainly possessed them, but evidence of custody before the mid thirteenth century is lacking. In theory, these territories could have been awarded to the kindred following the Scots' acquisition of the Isles in 1266. On the other hand, the family's position in the Isles may have stemmed from its marital alliance with the Crovan dynasty, an affiliation undertaken at some point before Ruaidhrí's apparent expulsion from Kintyre. (Note: It is also possible that the mainland territories of Clann Ruaidhrí were lands earlier possessed by Somhairle mac Giolla Brighde, common ancestor of Clann Somhairle, and that the island territories passed from the Crovan dynasty to Clann Somhairle by way of Somhairle's wife, Ragnhildr Óláfsdóttir.) If the family indeed acquired Uist after the events of 1266, it could cast further light on Ailéan's part in the quelling of the aforesaid Manx revolt. Whatever the case, Ailéan is not accorded any title in contemporary sources. (Note: There is reason to suspect that the title rí Innsi Gall accorded to an apparent Clann Ruaidhrí chieftain in 1318—a man possibly identical to one of Ailéan's sons—was that of Ailéan's lordship and inherited from him. In 1293, the parliament of John, King of Scotland established a scheme of sheriffdoms along the western coast of the kingdom. The Hebridean islands of Lewis and Harris, Skye, Uist, Barra, Eigg, Rhum, and the Small Isles, were incorporated into a newly created Sheriffdom of Skye, administrated by William II, Earl of Ross. In fact, it was successive disputes with the comital family of Ross in the later century that led to the ultimate demise of Clann Ruaidhrí.)

An inventory of parliamentary documents from 1282 reveals that the Scottish Crown received a letter from the Norwegian king concerning the lands of Uist and Eigg. Nothing further is known of the letter. One possibility is that the correspondence is evidence of a dispute over the islands in which members of Clann Ruaidhrí sought the Norwegian king's intercession. In 1285/1286, a servant of the Spanish Crown appealed to Alexander III, accusing Ailéan of piracy in the Hebrides.

Ailéan disappears from record by 1296, and seems to have died at some point before this date. At some point after his death, and before the death of Alexander III, Isabella married Ingram de Umfraville as her second husband. Ailéan had three children: his sons Lachlann and Ruaidhrí were illegitimate, whilst his daughter Cairistíona was legitimate. It is possible that Cairistíona's mother was Isabella. Although Cairistíona seems to have been Ailéan's heir, she was evidently supplanted by her brothers soon after his death. Ailéan's descendants continued to be factors in Scottish history well into the fourteenth century.

== Ancestry ==
Ancestors of Ailéan mac Ruaidhrí

16. Giolla Brighde mac Giolla Adhamhnáin
8. Somhairle mac Giolla Brighde (died 1164)
4. Raghnall mac Somhairle (died 1191/1192 – c. 1210/1227)
18. Óláfr Guðrøðarson (died 1153)
9. Ragnhildr Óláfsdóttir
2. Ruaidhrí mac Raghnaill (died 1247?)
1. Ailéan mac Ruaidhrí (died ×1296)
