= Ruaidhrí Mac Ruaidhrí =

Scottish magnate

- Ostensibly Ruaidhrí's surname and title as they appear on folio 82v (part 2) of Royal Irish Academy P 6 (the Annals of the Four Masters). The entry records the death of a member of Clann Ruaidhrí, likely Ruaidhrí himself, in 1318.
- Predecessor: Ailéan mac Ruaidhrí
- Successor: Raghnall Mac Ruaidhrí
- Died: 14 October 1318? Battle of Faughart?
- Noble family: Clann Ruaidhrí
- Issue: Raghnall and Áine
- Father: Ailéan mac Ruaidhrí

Ruaidhrí Mac Ruaidhrí (died 14 October 1318?) was a fourteenth-century Scottish magnate and chief of Clann Ruaidhrí. (Note: Since the 1980s, academics have accorded Ruaidhrí various patronyms in English secondary sources: Roderick MacAlan, Roderick Macruari, Ruaidrí Mac Ruaidrí, Ruaidrí MacRuaidrí, Ruairi mac Allan, Ruairi MacRuairi, Ruairi Macruarie, Ruairidh mac Ailein, Ruari MacRuari, Ruari macRuari, Ruari MacRuaridh, and Ruarie MacRuarie.) He was an illegitimate son of Ailéan mac Ruaidhrí, and is recorded to have participated in the kindred's military actions against supporters of both the English Crown and Scottish Crown. Following the apparent death of his brother, Lachlann, Ruaidhrí appears to have taken control of the kindred, and firmly aligned the family with Robert I, King of Scotland. Ruaidhrí may well be the member of Clann Ruaidhrí who is recorded slain at the Battle of Faughart in support of the Bruce cause in Ireland. After his death, Ruaidhrí's half-sister, Cairistíona, attempted to transfer the Clann Ruaidhrí territories outside the family. Ruaidhrí was survived by a daughter, Áine, and an illegitimate son, Raghnall. The latter fended off Cairistíona's actions and succeeded to the chiefship of Clann Ruaidhrí.

== Clann Ruaidhrí ==
Ruaidhrí was an illegitimate son of Ailéan mac Ruaidhrí, a son of Ruaidhrí mac Raghnaill, Lord of Kintyre, eponym of Clann Ruaidhrí. Ailéan had another illegitimate son, Lachlann Mac Ruaidhrí, and a legitimate daughter, Cairistíona. It was Ruaidhrí's generation—the second generation in descent from Ruaidhrí mac Raghnaill—that members of Clann Ruaidhrí are first identified with a family name derived from this eponymous ancestor. (Note: For example, Ruaidhrí may be identical to a certain "Mac Ruaidhri, ri Innsi Gall" noted by the fifteenth- to sixteenth-century Annals of Ulster.) Clann Ruaidhrí was a branch of Clann Somhairle. Other branches of this overarching kindred included Clann Dubhghaill and Clann Domhnaill. Ailéan disappears from record by 1296, and seems to have died at some point before this date. Although Cairistíona seems to have been Ailéan's heir, she was evidently supplanted by her brothers soon after his death.

== Conflict amongst Clann Somhairle ==
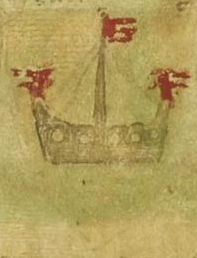
The arms of the Lord of Argyll depicted in the fourteenth-century Balliol Roll. (Note: The escutcheon is blazoned: or, a galley sable with dragon heads at prow and stern and flag flying gules, charged on the hull with four portholes argent. The coat of arms corresponds to the seal of Alasdair Mac Dubhghaill, Ruaidhrí's distant kinsman and ally. Since the galley was a symbol of Clann Dubhghaill and seemingly Raghnall mac Somhairle—ancestor of Clann Ruaidhrí and Clann Domhnaill—it is conceivable that it was also a symbol of the Clann Somhairle progenitor, Somhairle mac Giolla Brighde. It was also a symbol of the Crovan dynasty, which could mean that it passed to Somhairle's family through his wife.)

In 1296, Edward I, King of England invaded and easily conquered the Scottish realm. Amongst the Scots imprisoned by the English were many of the Ross elite, including William II, Earl of Ross. The earl remained in captivity from 1296 to 1303, a lengthy span of years in which the sons of Ailéan capitalised upon the resulting power vacuum. Like most other Scottish landholders, Ruaidhrí's brother rendered homage to the triumphant king later in 1296. Lachlann was married to a daughter of Alasdair Mac Dubhghaill, Lord of Argyll. The latter had been a staunch supporter of the Scottish king, a fact which appears to have led Edward I to use the former's principal rival, Alasdair Óg Mac Domhnaill, Lord of Islay, the chief of Clann Domhnaill, as his primary agent in the maritime west. In this capacity, Alasdair Óg attempted to contain the Clann Dubhghaill revolt against English authority.

The struggle between the two Clann Somhairle namesakes seems to be attested not long after Alasdair Óg's appointment in April 1296, and is documented in two undated letters from the latter to Edward I. In the first, Alasdair Óg complained to the king that Alasdair Mac Dubhghaill had ravaged his lands. Although Alasdair Óg further noted that he had overcome Ruaidhrí and thereby brought him to heel, the fealty that Ruaidhrí swore to the English Crown appears to have been rendered merely as a stalling tactic, since Lachlann then attacked Alasdair Óg, and both Clann Ruaidhrí brothers proceeded to ravage Skye and Lewis and Harris. At the end of the letter, the Clann Domhnaill chief implored upon Edward I to instruct the other noblemen of Argyll and Ross to aid him in his struggle against the king's enemies. (Note: According to early twentieth-century tradition in Ardnamurchan, two battles were fought in the bays between Gortenfern (grid reference NM 608 689) and Sgeir a' Chaolais (grid reference NM 623 702). Archaeological finds in the vicinity of Cul na Croise (grid reference NM 622 698)—a bay between Sgeir a Chaolais and Sgeir nam Meann—consist of spears, daggers, arrow-heads, and a coin dating to the reign of Edward I. These artefacts could indicate that Cul na Croise was the site of conflict fought in the context of the strife between Edward I's representative, Alasdair Óg, and the Clann Ruaidhrí brothers, Lachlann and Ruaidhrí. According to early twentieth-century local tradition, one of the battles fought in the area concerned a certain "Red Rover", and another fought nearby concerned an Irishman named "Duing" or "Dewing".)

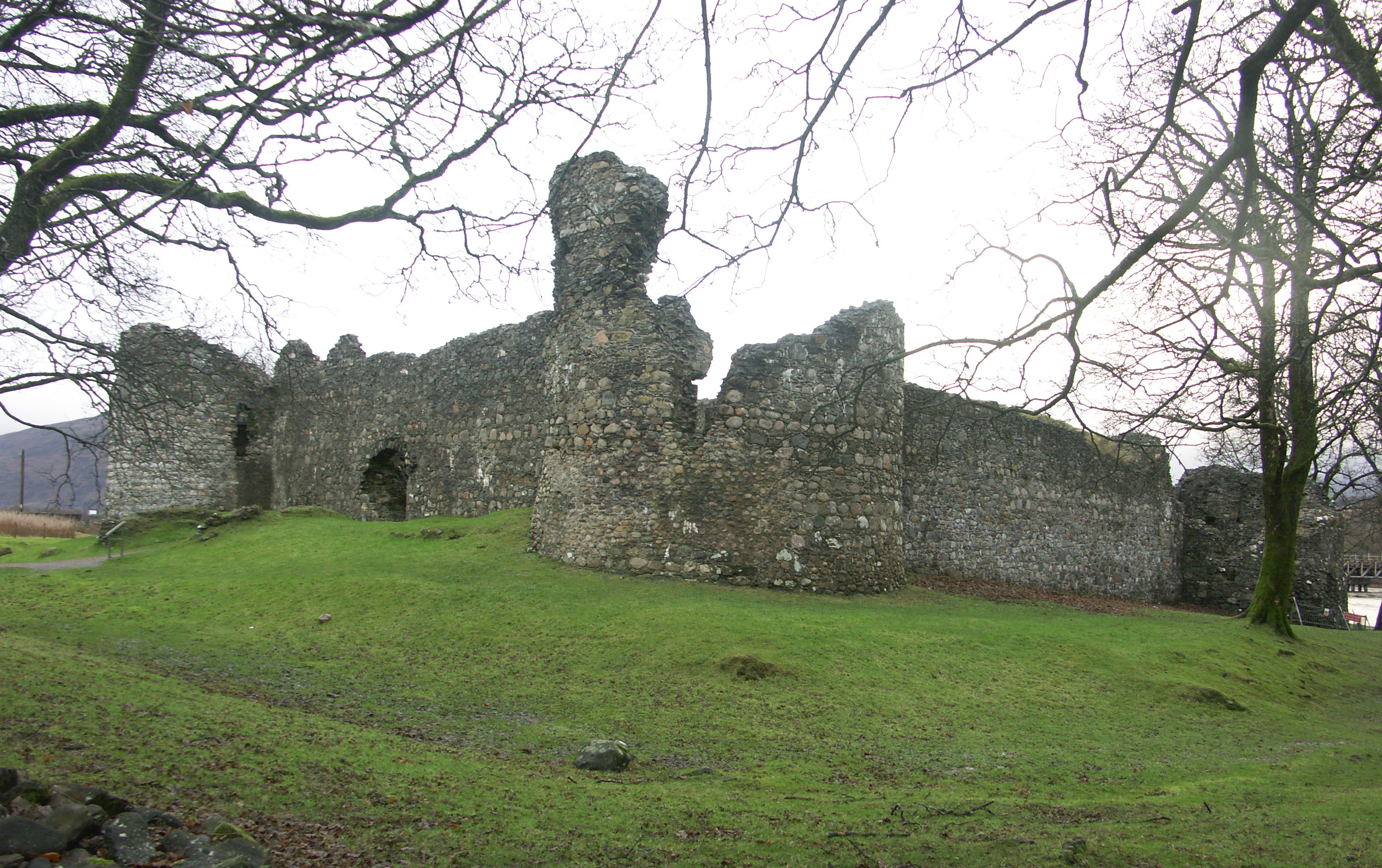
Now-ruinous Inverlochy Castle was once a stronghold of the Comyn kindred. In 1297, Alasdair Óg Mac Domhnaill pursued his opponents to the castle, where he attempted to capture the largest warships on the western seaboard.

In the second letter, Alasdair Óg again appealed to the English Crown, complaining that he faced a united front from (Alasdair Mac Dubhghaill's son) Donnchadh Mac Dubhghaill, Lachlann, Ruaidhrí, and the Comyns. According to Alasdair Óg, the men of Lochaber had sworn allegiance to Lachlann and Donnchadh Mac Dubhghaill. In one instance Alasdair Óg reported that, although he had been able to force Lachlann's supposed submission, he was thereupon attacked by Ruaidhrí. The Clann Domhnaill chief further related a specific expedition in which he pursued his opponents to the Comyn stronghold of Inverlochy Castle—the principal fortress in Lochaber—where he was unable to capture—but nevertheless destroyed—two massive galleys which he described as the largest warships in the Western Isles. Much like the first letter, Alasdair Óg called upon the English king for financial support in combating his mounting opponents.

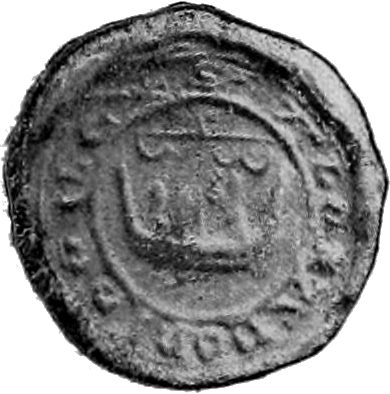
The seal of Alasdair Óg Mac Domhnaill, opponent of Ruaidhrí and his brother.

Alasdair Óg's dispatches seem to show that Lachlann and Ruaidhrí were focused upon seizing control of Skye and Lewis and Harris from the absentee Earl of Ross. Whilst the first communiqué reveals that the initial assault upon the islands concerned pillage, the second letter appears to indicate that the islands were subjected to further invasions by Clann Ruaidhrí, suggesting that the acquisition of these islands was the family's goal. The bitter strife between Clann Ruaidhrí and Clann Domhnaill depicted by these letters seems to indicate that both kindreds sought to capitalise on the earl's absence, and that both families sought to incorporate the islands into their own lordships. In specific regard to Clann Ruaidhrí, it is likely that the kindred's campaigning was an extension of the conflict originating from the creation of the shrievalty of Skye, granted to William II in 1293. As Sheriff of Skye, William II's shrieval jurisdiction evidently encompassed the entirety of the Clann Ruaidhrí estate.

The correspondence also reveals that Lachlann and Ruaidhrí were able to split their forces and operate somewhat independently of each other. Although Alasdair Óg was evidently able to overcome one of them at a time, he was nevertheless vulnerable to a counterattack from the other. Another aspect of the strife between the two kindreds is the possibility that it coincided with the anti-English campaign waged by Andrew Murray and Alexander Pilche against the embattled Countess of Ross in eastern Ross. If so, it is conceivable that there was some sort of communication and coordination between Clann Ruaidhrí and the Murray-Pilche coalition. Lachlann's marital alliance with Clann Dubhghaill clearly benefited his kindred, linking it with the Comyn-Clann Dubhghaill pact in a coalition that encircled the Earldom of Ross.

== Campaigning for and against Robert I ==
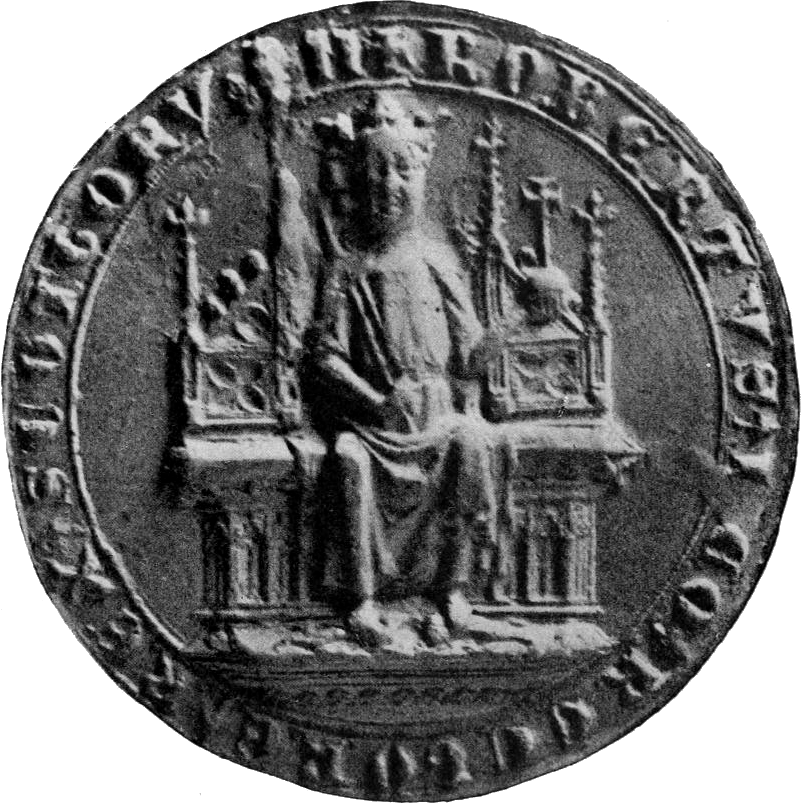
The seal of Robert I. After seizing the throne for himself, this embattled king appears to have partly owed his survival to efforts of Ruaidhrí's sister, Cairistíona.

In February 1306, Robert Bruce VII, Earl of Carrick, a claimant to the Scottish throne, killed his chief rival to the kingship, John Comyn of Badenoch. Although the former seized the throne (as Robert I) by March, the English Crown immediately struck back, defeating his forces in June. By September, Robert I was a fugitive, and appears to have escaped into the Hebrides. According to the fourteenth-century Gesta Annalia II, Ruaidhrí's sister, Cairistíona, played an instrumental part in Robert I's survival at this low point in his career, sheltering him along Scotland's western seaboard.

Cairistíona's connections with the Mar kindred may well account for her support of the Bruce cause. One possibility is that her husband, Donnchadh, was a younger son of Uilleam, Earl of Mar. Another possibility is that Donnchadh was instead a son of Uilleam's son, Domhnall I, Earl of Mar. Certainly, Domhnall I's daughter, Iseabail, was the first wife of Robert I, and Domhnall I's son and comital successor, Gartnait, was the husband of a sister of Robert I. In any case, later the next year, at about the time of Edward I's death in July 1307, Robert I mounted a remarkable return to power by first consolidating control of Carrick. In contrast to the evidence of assistance lent by Cairistíona to the Scottish king, Lachlann is recorded to have aligned himself closer with the English, as he appears to have personally sworn fealty to Edward I in August 1306, and petitioned for the lands of a supporter of the Bruce cause.

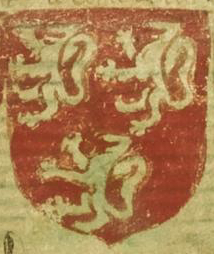
The arms of the Earl of Ross depicted in Balliol Roll.

In October, there is evidence indicating that a certain Cristin del Ard delivered messages from the English Crown to William II, Lachlann, Ruaidhrí, and a certain Eóin Mac Neacail. The latter appears to be the earliest member of Clann Mhic Neacail on record. At about this time, this clan seems to have been seated on Skye and Lewis and Harris, and it is possible that the comital family of Ross had cultivated Clann Mhic Neacail as an ally against Clann Ruaidhrí shortly after the creation of the shrievalty of Skye in 1293. Cristin was a close associate of William II, and the fact that the English Crown seems to have used the earl as a conduit for communications with Clann Ruaidhrí and Clann Mhic Neacail appears to indicate that the earl had brought the northwestern territories of these families back within his sphere of influence. Whatever the case, William II played a key role in Robert I's misfortunes at about this time, as the earl captured the latter's wife and daughter—Elizabeth and Marjorie—and delivered them into the hands of Edward I. The correspondence delivered by Cristin could have concerned this particular episode, and may evince an attempt by the English Crown to project pro-English power into the Isles against Robert I and his supporters.

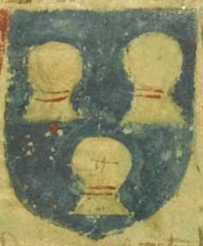
The arms of the Earl of Buchan depicted in Balliol Roll.

Lachlann last appears on record in 1307/1308 in correspondence between William II and Edward II, King of England. At the time, the earl appears to have found himself in a perilous position as John Comyn, Earl of Buchan, another northern opponent of Bruce, found himself the target of Robert I's attention late in 1307, and was soundly subdued by him in 1308. This consolidation of power by the Scottish Crown was evidently not William II's only concern, as he reported to Edward II that Lachlann refused to render to him the revenues that Lachlann owed to the English Crown. In the words of William II, Lachlann "is such a high and mighty lord, he'll not answer to anyone except under great force or through fear of you". The earl's letter is clearly a testimonial to the strength of Clann Ruaidhrí at this point in time, evidently comparable to that of the earl. In fact, it is possible that it was due to this kindred's considerable influence in the region that the Bruce cause found any support in Ross—support evidenced by a letter to the English Crown in 1307 relating the unease of the English adherents Duncan Frendraught, Reginald Cheyne, and Gilbert Glencarnie. Certainly, the fourteenth-century Chronicle of Lanercost reveals that Robert I received Hebridean support when he first launched his return in Galloway. Having been in conflict with William II for over decade, it appears that Lachlann and his kin capitalised on Robert I's campaign against William II and his confederates. The Scottish king's success against the earl may well have stemmed from leading Islesmen like Lachlann himself. In 1308, the earl submitted to Robert I, and thereby offset aggression from his Clann Ruaidhrí adversaries. Following Lachlann's last appearance on record, perhaps after his own demise, Ruaidhrí seems to have succeeded him in representation of Clann Ruaidhrí. (Note: At about the turn of the twentieth century, partisan historians of Clann Domhnaill portrayed Lachlann, Ruaidhrí, and their kin as "Highland rovers", and likened their exploits against Clann Domhnaill to the "piratical tendencies of the ancient Vikings". Later in twentieth-century historical literature, Lachlann was still regarded a "sinister figure", likened to a "buccaneering predator", and described as a "shadowy figure ... always in the background, always a troublemaker". Such summarisations of their lives are nevertheless oversimplifications of their recorded careers as vigorous regional lords.) In August 1309, Robert I is known to have been at "Lochbren". One possibility is that this location refers to Lochbren, in the parish of Urray, near Dingwall. Another possibility is that it refers to Loch Broom. If the latter location is correct, it could indicate that, whilst the king was in the region, he was gathering troops from Clann Ruaidhrí for his apparent capture of Dunstaffnage Castle from Clann Dubhghaill in October.

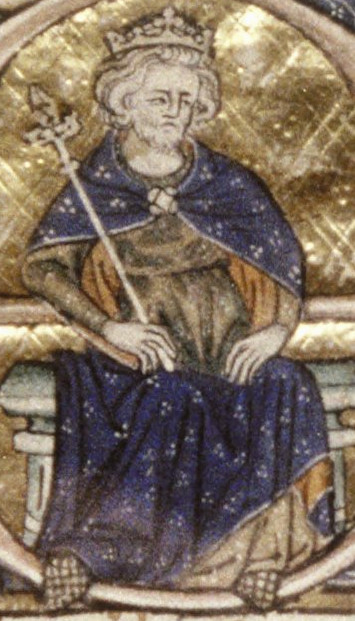
A fourteenth-century illumination of Edward II on folio 105r of Oxford Bodleian Library Rawlinson C 292.

Seemingly in 1310, whilst in the service of the English Crown, Aonghus Óg Mac Domhnaill entreated the king on behalf of several unnamed members of Clann Ruaidhrí—men were then aiding the English-aligned forces of Aonghus Óg and Hugh Bisset—asking the king to grant the Clann Ruaidhrí clansmen feu of their ancestral lands. (Note: Alasdair Óg seems to have been killed in battle against Clann Dubhghaill in 1299, after which his brother Aonghus Óg appears to have succeeded him as chief of Clann Domhnaill.) An indication of the military might at Clann Dubhghaill's disposal may be Aonghus Óg's expressed opinion that, if he were able to join forces with Alasdair Mac Dubhghaill, the English king would have nothing to fear from his enemies. An associated letter—this one from Hugh to the sovereign—reveals that Aonghus Óg, Eóin Mac Suibhne, and Hugh himself, were all engaged in maritime operations in the service of the English that year. (Note: Although these letters of Aonghus Óg and Hugh are sometimes assumed to date to 1301, another letter associated with them concerns the continued English service of Hugh and Eóin Mac Suibhne. The fact that this piece of correspondence identifies John Menteith as an opponent of the English Crown suggests that all three may instead date to 1310. According to this letter, Eóin Mac Suibhne was unable to regain his promised territories of Knapdale primarily because of the forces of Eóin Mac Dubhghaill. Ostensibly, Eóin Mac Suibhne, Eóin Mac Dubhghaill, and John Menteith, were all supporters of the English Crown during this period. However, the latter was present at Robert I's parliament of 1309, and it is possible that this Clann Dubhghaill occupation of Knapdale prompted John Menteith to switch his allegiance to the Bruce cause.)

== Contested Clann Ruaidhrí succession ==
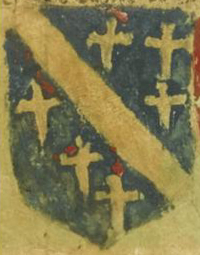
The arms of the Earl of Mar depicted in Balliol roll.

Although Cairistíona was the sole legitimate offspring of their father, it is unlikely that members of the kindred regarded legitimate birth as the sole qualification of succession. In fact, there was little distinction between legitimate and illegitimate offspring in Gaelic Scotland, as society tolerated temporary sexual unions amongst the elite as a means of furthering the continuation of the male line of the clan. As the leading male member of Clann Ruaidhrí at this stage, it is probable that Ruaidhrí himself possessed control of the kindred's wide-ranging territories. Nevertheless, Ruaidhrí seems to have only gained formal recognition of his rights to the lordship after Christina's resignation of her own claims, by way of a charter confirmed by Robert himself.

There is reason to suspect that Cairistíona's stake in the lordship—and her close connections with Robert I—posed a potential threat to Ruaidhrí and his descendants. Furthermore, Cairistíona and Donnchadh had a son, Ruaidhrí, who potentially could have sought royal assistance in pursuance of his mother's claims. The name Cairistíona bestowed upon this son could indicate that he was not only named after his maternal grandfather, but that he was regarded as a potential successor to the Clann Ruaidhrí lordship. Certainly, Cairistíona resigned her claims with the condition that, if her brother died without a male heir, and her like-named son married one of her brother's daughters, Cairistíona's son would secure the inheritance. Although the charter outlining her resignation is undated, it seems to have been granted early in the reign of Robert I, possibly before the end of the first decade the century.

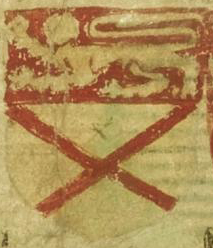
The arms of the Earl of Carrick depicted in Balliol roll.

On one hand, it is possible that the king orchestrated Ruaidhrí's succession to the lordship as a means of securing support from one of the most powerful families on the western coast. On the other hand, the fact that Cairistíona—a close personal ally of Robert I—had been superseded by Ruaidhrí—a man with a comparatively chequered political career—could indicate that the latter's consolidation of control more likely stemmed from internal family politics than from royal interference. Whatever the case, Ruaidhrí was likely already regarded as the rightful chief, and the charter itself undeniably brought him under feudal dependence of the Scottish Crown. Ruaidhrí's provincial lordship encompassed the mainland territories of Moidart, Arisaig, Morar, and Knoydart; and the island territories of Rhum, Eigg, Barra, St Kilda, and Uist. This dominion, like the great lordships of Annandale and Galloway, was comparable to any of the kingdom's thirteen earldoms.

== Death in support of the Scottish Crown ==
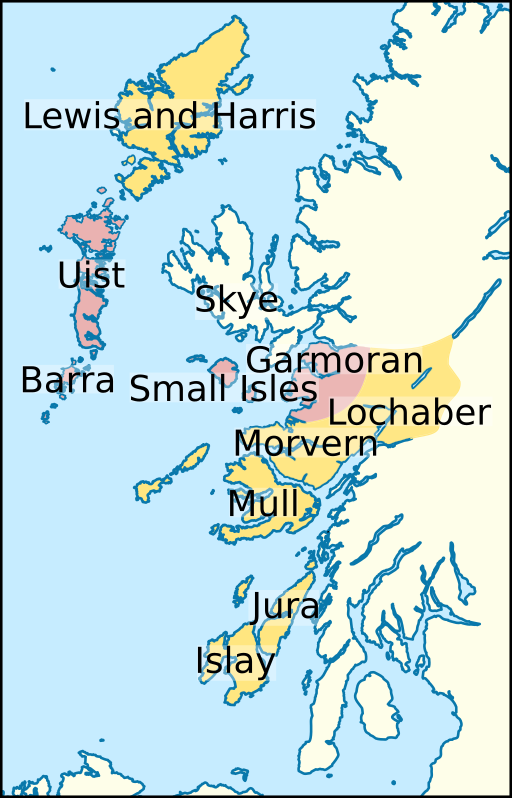
The extent of the Clann Domhnaill Lordship of the Isles in 1343 (yellow). The Clann Ruaidhrí territories (red) were absorbed within this lordship after the death of Ruaidhrí's son, Raghnall in 1346.

There is evidence to suggest that Ruaidhrí assisted the Scottish Crown in its campaigning against the Anglo-Irish in Ireland, and that he lost his life in the crushing Scottish defeat at the Battle of Faughart on 14 October 1318. In 1315, Robert I's younger brother, Edward Bruce, Earl of Carrick, launched an invasion of Ireland and claimed the high-kingship of Ireland. For three years, the Scots and their Irish allies campaigned on the island against the Anglo-Irish and their allies. Although every other pitched-battle between the Scots and the Anglo-Irish resulted in a Scottish victory, the utter catastrophe at Faughart cost Edward his life and brought an end to the Bruce regime in Ireland. According to the sixteenth-century Annals of Loch Cé, a certain "Mac Ruaidhri ri Innsi Gall" and a "Mac Domnaill, ri Oirir Gaidheal" were slain in the onslaught. This source is mirrored by several other Irish annals including the fifteenth- to sixteenth-century Annals of Connacht, the seventeenth-century Annals of the Four Masters, the fifteenth- to sixteenth-century Annals of Ulster, and the seventeenth-century Annals of Clonmacnoise. (Note: The Annals of Clonmacnoise exists only in an early modern translation and gives: "mcRory king of the islands and mcDonnell prince of the Irish of Scotland".) The precise identities of these men are unknown for certain, although they seem to have been the heads of Clann Ruaidhrí and Clann Domhnaill, and the former man may well have been Ruaidhrí himself. (Note: The identity of the slain member of Clann Domhnaill is uncertain. He could have been Alasdair Óg (if he wasn't killed in 1299), or a son of Alasdair Óg, or perhaps Aonghus Óg, or a son of the latter. Another possibility is that the slain chieftain is identical to a certain Domhnall of Islay, an apparent leading member of Clann Domhnaill who appears on record in the early fourteenth century. This latter figure is described as a brother of a certain Gofraidh. The men are attested in records revealing that Eóin Mac Dubhghaill was commissioned to bring both into the peace of the English king at some point. Although both may well have been members of Clann Domhnaill and indeed brothers, another possibility is that these men are instead identical to the apparent chiefs of Clann Ruaidhrí and Clann Domhnaill slain with Edward Bruce in 1318, and that the Latin and Anglo-Norman names accorded to Gofraidh and Domhnall are actually garbled forms of the Gaelic surnames borne by these chiefs.) The title accorded to the slain Clann Ruaidhrí chieftain could well refer to the Clann Ruaidhrí lordship inherited from Ruaidhrí's father. (Note: The exaggerated title "King of Argyll" accorded to the slain Clann Domhnaill dynast in many of these annal-entries exemplifies the catastrophic effect that the rise of the Bruce regime had on its opponents like Clann Dubhghaill.)

Another major engagement that featured Clann Ruaidhrí was the final defeat of Ruaidhrí Ó Conchobair, King of Connacht at the hands of Feidhlimidh Ó Conchobair, when a certain Donnchadh Mac Ruaidhrí and one hundred gallowglasses fell with the king. One set of annals describes the fallen gallowglasses as "noble". The following year, in 1317, Clann Ruaidhrí was a participant in another crushing defeat, when the forces of Connacht vanquished those of Bréifne. According to one set of annals, seven score gallowglasses of a certain "Mac Ruaidri" were slain in the encounter.

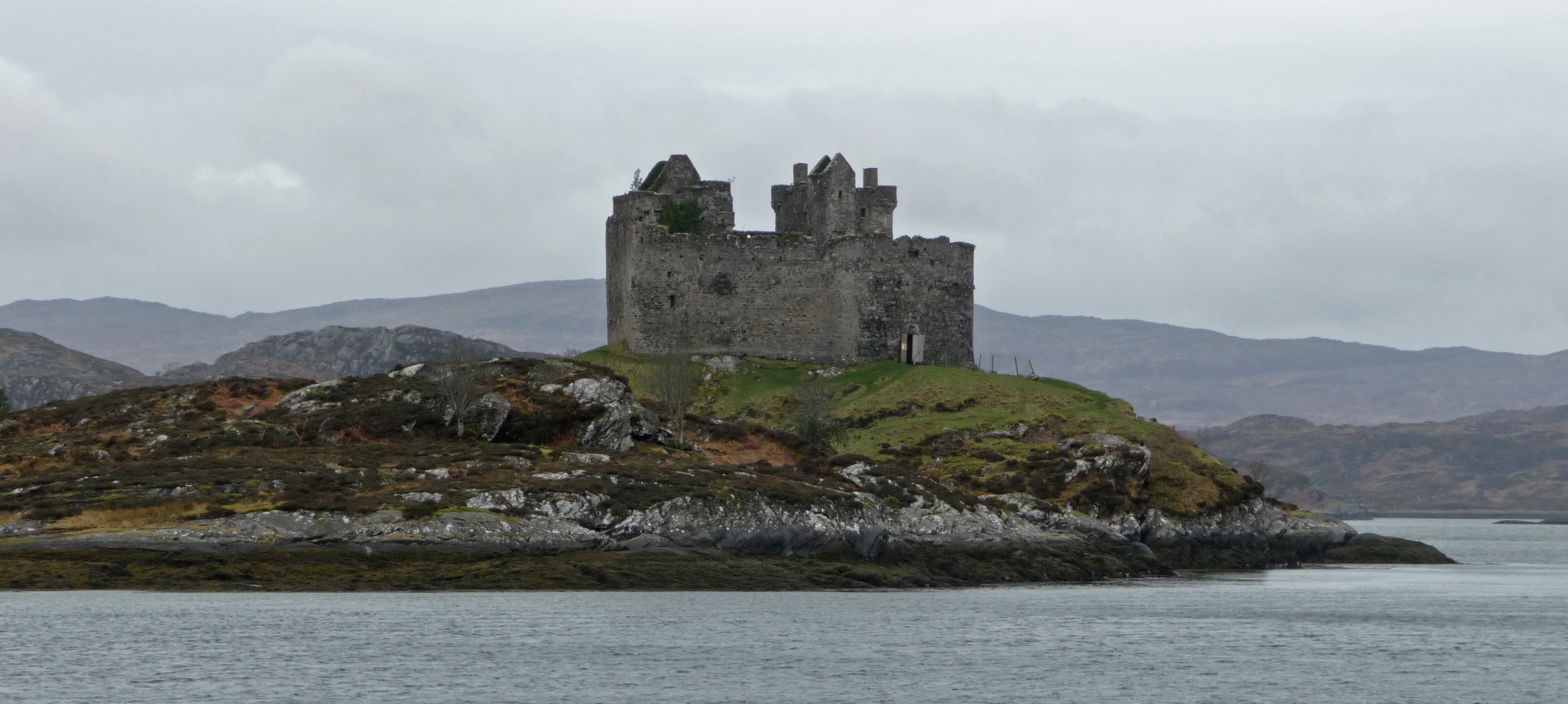
Now-ruinous Castle Tioram may well have been a Clann Ruaidhrí stronghold. The island the fortress sits upon is first recorded in a charter of Ruaidhrí's half-sister, Cairistíona.

Although Ruaidhrí seems to have ensured the continuation of his kindred by formally coming to terms with Robert I and campaigning in Ireland with the latter's brother, there is evidence indicating that the Clann Ruaidhrí inheritance was contested by Cairistíona after his demise. Ruaidhrí was survived by a daughter, Áine, and an illegitimate son, Raghnall. (Note: The identity of Raghnall's mother is unknown.) The latter may well have been under age at the time of Ruaidhrí's death, and it is apparent that Cairistíona and her confederates attempted to seize control of the inheritance. Although Cairistíona is recorded to have resigned her claimed rights to a certain Artúr Caimbéal after Ruaidhrí's death, it is clear that Raghnall eventually succeeded in securing the region, and was regarded as the chief of Clann Ruaidhrí by most of his kin. (Note: The list of witnesses who attested this grant is remarkable. It includes: John Menteith, Domhnall Caimbéal, Alasdair Mac Neachdainn, Eóghan Mac Íomhair, Donnchadh Caimbéal (son of Tomás Caimbéal), Niall Mac Giolla Eáin, and (the latter's brother) Domhnall Mac Giolla Eáin. These men all seem to have been close adherents of Robert I against Clann Dubhghaill, and all represented families of power along the western seaboard. An alliance of such men may well have been an intimidating prospect to the Clann Ruaidhrí leadership. The territorial transfer outlined in Cairistíona's charter to Artúr differs from her earlier resignation to Ruaidhrí in the fact that it excludes the Uists and includes what came to be known as Castle Tioram. Why this is so is uncertain. Quite why Cairistíona attempted to alienate the Clann Ruaidhrí estate from the kindred itself is also uncertain. One possibility is that the contract was the prelude to a marriage contract with the Caimbéalaigh kindred (the Campbells). Artúr and his like-named father appear to have been particularly ambitious members of this latter kindred, and men who clearly prospered from Robert I's dismemberment of the Clann Dubhghaill lordship.) Despite Raghnall's success in securing control of his ancestral estate, after his own demise these territories passed into the possession of Áine's husband (or former husband), Eóin Mac Domhnaill I, Lord of the Isles, chief of Clann Domhnaill.

== Ancestry ==
Ancestors of Ruaidhrí Mac Ruaidhrí

16. Somhairle mac Giolla Brighde (died 1164)
8. Raghnall mac Somhairle (died 1191/1192 – c. 1210/1227)
17. Ragnhildr Óláfsdóttir
4. Ruaidhrí mac Raghnaill (died 1247?)
2. Ailéan mac Ruaidhrí (died ×1296)
1. Ruaidhrí Mac Ruaidhrí (died 1318?)
