= Lachlann Mac Ruaidhrí =

Scottish magnate

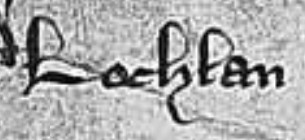
- Lachlann's name as it appears in correspondence between John Strathbogie, Earl of Atholl and Edward I, King of England
- Predecessor: Ailéan mac Ruaidhrí
- Successor: Ruaidhrí Mac Ruaidhrí
- Noble family: Clann Ruaidhrí
- Father: Ailéan mac Ruaidhrí

Lachlann Mac Ruaidhrí (fl. 1297 – 1307/1308) was a Scottish magnate and chief of Clann Ruaidhrí. (Note: Since the 1970s, academics have accorded Lachlann various patronyms in English secondary sources: Lachlan Mac Ruaidhri, Lachlan Mac Ruairi, Lachlan MacRuairi, Lachlan MacRuairidh, Lachlan MacRuari, Lachlan macRuari, Lachlan Macruarie, Lachlan MacRuarie, Lachlann Mac Ruaidhrí, and Lochlan Macruari.) He was a free-booting participant in the First War of Scottish Independence, who remarkably took up arms against figures such as John, King of Scotland; Edward I, King of England; the Guardians of Scotland; and his near-rival William II, Earl of Ross. Lachlann disappears from record in 1307/1308, and appears to have been succeeded by his brother, Ruaidhrí, as chief of Clann Ruaidhrí.

== Clann Ruaidhrí ==
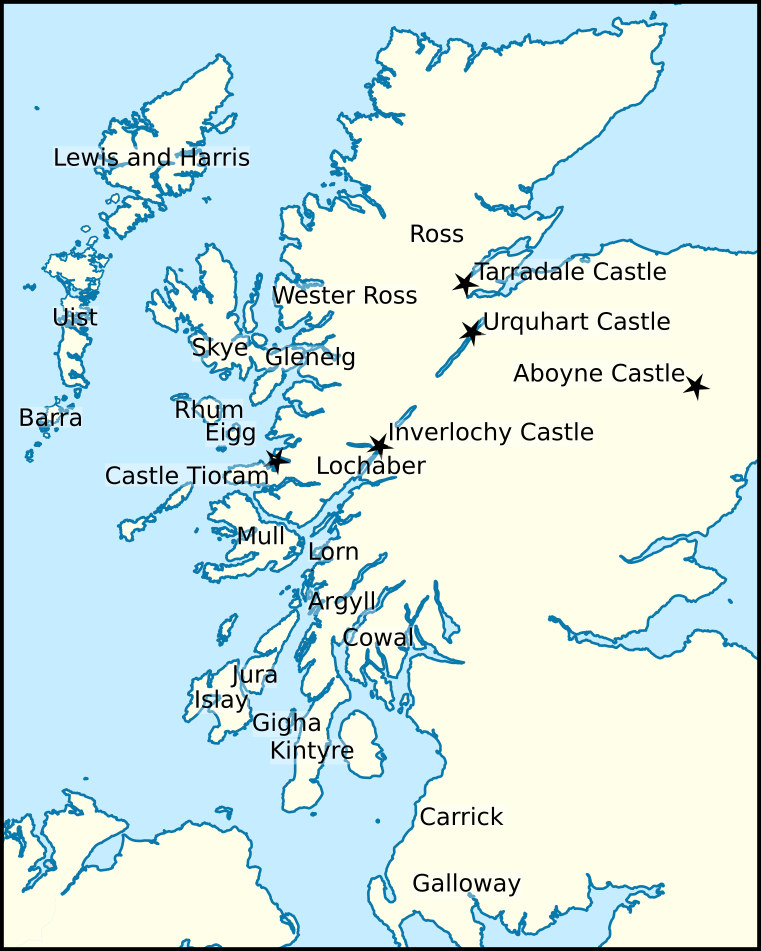
Locations relating to Lachlann's life and times

Lachlann was an illegitimate son of Ailéan mac Ruaidhrí, a son of Ruaidhrí mac Raghnaill, Lord of Kintyre, eponym of Clann Ruaidhrí. Ailéan had another illegitimate son, Ruaidhrí, and a legitimate daughter, Cairistíona. It was Lachlann's generation—the second generation in descent from Ruaidhrí mac Raghnaill—that members of Clann Ruaidhrí are first identified with a family name derived from this eponymous ancestor. (Note: For example, in one particular piece of correspondence Lachlann is called "Laclan Magrogri".) Clann Ruaidhrí was a branch of Clann Somhairle. Other branches of this overarching kindred included Clann Dubhghaill and Clann Domhnaill. Lachlann was married to a daughter of Alasdair Mac Dubhghaill, Lord of Argyll. Lachlann was therefore not only a brother-in-law of Alasdair Mac Dubhghaill's succeeding son, Eóin Mac Dubhghaill, but also the brother-in-law of a leading member of Clann Laghmainn, Maol Muire mac Laghmainn, and likely also brother-in-law of the chief of Clann Domhnaill, Alasdair Óg Mac Domhnaill, Lord of Islay.

== Career ==
=== In opposition to English adherents ===
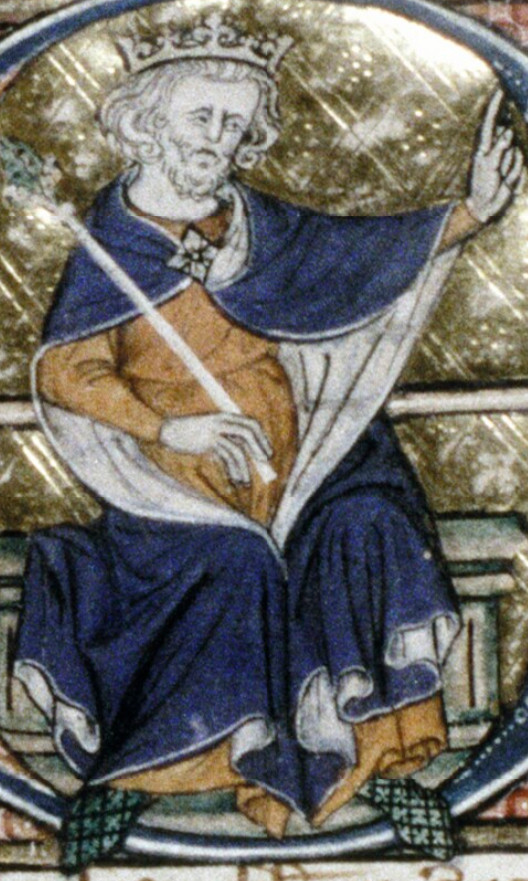
A fourteenth-century illumination of Edward I on folio 9r of Oxford Bodleian Library Rawlinson C 292

Ailéan disappears from record by 1296, and seems to have died at some point before this date. Although Cairistíona seems to have been Ailéan's heir, she was evidently supplanted by her brothers soon after his death. Lachlann is first attested in contemporary sources in 1292. In July of that year, he is mentioned in proceedings conducted at Berwick between Alasdair Mac Dubhghaill and Edward I, King of England, in which Alasdair Mac Dubhghaill personally promised to keep peace in the Hebrides, amicably settle his dispute with his Clann Domhnaill namesake and rival, Alasdair Óg, and bring the unruly Clann Ruaidhrí under the king's authority. The fact that Alasdair Mac Dubhghaill vowed to have no dealings with his son Donnchadh and Lachlann—as these men were unwilling to submit to Edward I—suggests that Lachlann had earlier allied himself with Clann Dubhghaill in disputes with Clann Domhnaill. The following year, in an effort to maintain peace in the western reaches of his realm, John, King of Scotland established the shrievalties of Skye and Lorn. The former region—consisting of Wester Ross, Glenelg, Skye, Lewis and Harris, Uist, Barra, Eigg, Rhum, and the Small Isles—was given to William II, Earl of Ross, whilst the latter region—consisting of Argyll (except Cowal and Kintyre), Mull, Jura and Islay—was given to Alasdair Mac Dubhghaill. Despite the king's intentions, his new sheriffs seem to have used their positions to exploit royal power against local rivals. Whilst Clann Domhnaill was forced to deal with its powerful Clann Dubhghaill rivals, Clann Ruaidhrí appears to have fallen afoul of the Earl of Ross over control of Kintail, Skye, and Uist. Evidence of the earl's actions against Clann Ruaidhrí is revealed in correspondence between him and the English Crown in 1304. In this particular communiqué, William II recalled a costly military campaign which he had conducted in the 1290s against rebellious Hebridean chieftains—including Lachlann himself—at the behest of the then-reigning John (reigned 1292–1296).

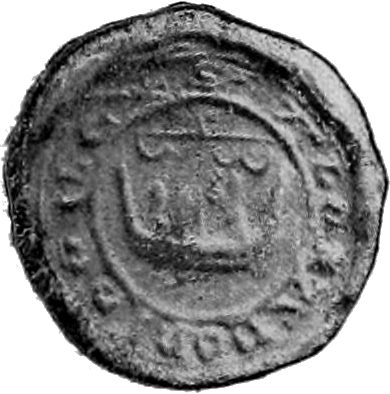
The seal of Alasdair Óg Mac Domhnaill, opponent of Lachlann and his brother

In 1296, Edward I invaded and easily conquered the Scottish realm. Amongst the Scots imprisoned by the English were many of the Ross elite, including William II himself. The earl remained in captivity from 1296 to 1303, a lengthy span of years in which the sons of Ailéan capitalised upon the resulting power vacuum. Like most other Scottish landholders, Lachlann rendered homage to the triumphant king later in 1296. (Note: In the record of his homage, Lachlann's name appears as "Rouland fiz Aleẏn Mac Rotherik". Anglo-Norman clerics are otherwise known to have rendered forms of the Gaelic name Lachlann into forms of the more common Continental name Roland. Lachlann is attested by numerous sources written in Latin and French, with about half of these according him forms of the name Roland.) One of the Scottish king's most ardent supporters had been Alasdair Mac Dubhghaill, a fact which appears to have led Edward I to use the former's chief rival, Alasdair Óg, the chief of Clann Domhnaill, as his primary agent in the maritime west. In this capacity, Alasdair Óg attempted to contain the Clann Dubhghaill revolt against English authority.

The struggle between the two Clann Somhairle namesakes seems to be attested not long after Alasdair Óg's appointment in April 1296, and is documented in two undated letters from the latter to Edward I. In the first, Alasdair Óg complained to the king that Alasdair Mac Dubhghaill had ravaged his lands. Although Alasdair Óg further noted that he had overcome Ruaidhrí and thereby brought him to heel, the fealty that Ruaidhrí swore to the English Crown appears to have been rendered merely as a stalling tactic, since Lachlann then attacked Alasdair Óg, and both Clann Ruaidhrí brothers proceeded to ravage Skye and Lewis and Harris. At the end of the letter, the Clann Domhnaill chief implored upon Edward I to instruct the other noblemen of Argyll and Ross to aid him in his struggle against the king's enemies. (Note: According to early twentieth-century tradition in Ardnamurchan, two battles were fought in the bays between Gortenfern (grid reference NM 608 689) and Sgeir a' Chaolais (grid reference NM 623 702). Archaeological finds in the vicinity of Cul na Croise (grid reference NM 622 698)—a bay between Sgeir a Chaolais and Sgeir nam Meann—consist of spears, daggers, arrow-heads, and a coin dating to the reign of Edward I. These artefacts could indicate that Cul na Croise was the site of conflict fought in the context of the strife between Edward I's representative, Alasdair Óg, and the Clann Ruaidhrí brothers, Lachlann and Ruaidhrí. According to early twentieth-century local tradition, one of the battles fought in the area concerned a certain "Red Rover", and another fought nearby concerned an Irishman named "Duing" or "Dewing".)

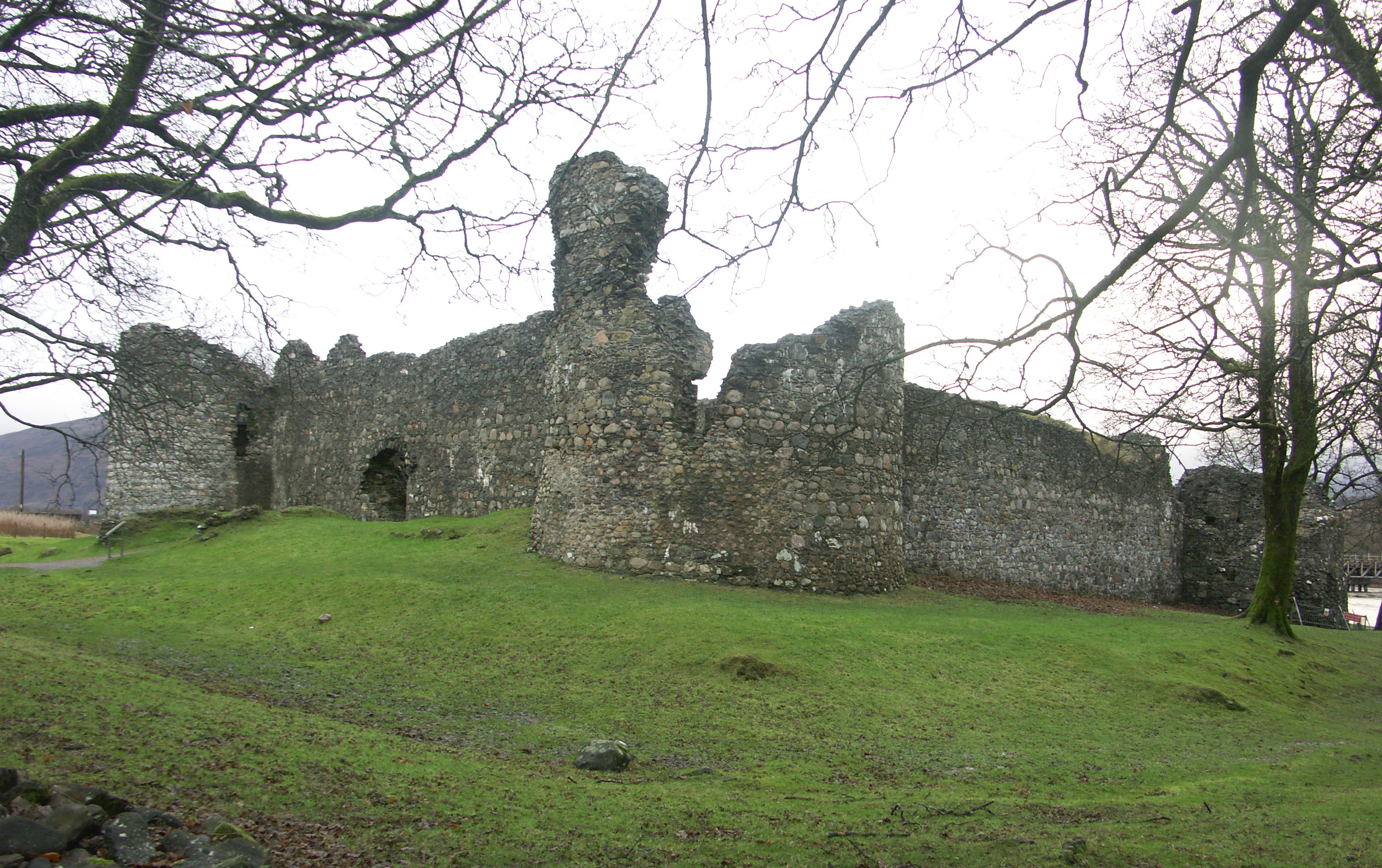
Now-ruinous Inverlochy Castle was once a stronghold of the Comyn kindred. In 1297, Alasdair Óg pursued his opponents to the castle, where he attempted to capture the largest warships on the western seaboard.

In the second letter, Alasdair Óg again appealed to the English Crown, complaining that he faced a united front from Donnchadh, Lachlann, Ruaidhrí, and the Comyns. According to Alasdair Óg, the men of Lochaber had sworn allegiance to Lachlann and Donnchadh. In one instance Alasdair Óg reported that, although he had been able to force Lachlann's supposed submission, he was thereupon attacked by Ruaidhrí. The Clann Domhnaill chief further related a specific expedition in which he pursued his opponents to the Comyn stronghold of Inverlochy Castle—the principal fortress in Lochaber—where he was unable to capture—but nevertheless destroyed—two massive galleys which he described as the largest warships in the Western Isles. Much like in the first letter, Alasdair Óg called upon the English king for financial support in combating his mounting opponents.

Alasdair Óg's dispatches seem to show that Lachlann and Ruaidhrí were focused upon seizing control of Skye and Lewis and Harris from the absentee Earl of Ross. Whilst the first communiqué reveals that the initial assault upon the islands concerned pillage, the second letter appears to indicate that the islands were subjected to further invasions by Clann Ruaidhrí, suggesting that the acquisition of these islands was the family's goal. The bitter strife between Clann Ruaidhrí and Clann Domhnaill depicted by these letters seems to indicate that both kindreds sought to capitalise on the earl's absence, and that both families sought to incorporate the islands into their own lordships. In specific regard to Clann Ruaidhrí, it is likely that the kindred's campaigning was an extension of the conflict originating from the creation of the shrievalty of Skye, granted to William II in 1293. The correspondence also reveals that Lachlann and Ruaidhrí were able to split their forces and operate somewhat independently of each other. Although Alasdair Óg was evidently able to overcome one of them at a time, he was nevertheless vulnerable to a counterattack from the other. Another aspect of the strife between the two kindreds is the possibility that it coincided with the anti-English campaign waged by Andrew Murray and Alexander Pilche against the embattled Countess of Ross in eastern Ross. If so, it is conceivable that there was some sort of communication and coordination between Clann Ruaidhrí and the Murray-Pilche coalition. Lachlann's marital alliance with Clann Dubhghaill clearly benefited his kindred, linking it with the Comyn-Clann Dubhghaill pact in a coalition that encircled the Earldom of Ross.

=== In opposition to Scottish patriots ===
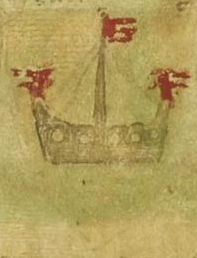
The arms of the Lord of Argyll depicted in the fourteenth-century Balliol Roll (Note: The escutcheon is blazoned: or, a galley sable with dragon heads at prow and stern and flag flying gules, charged on the hull with four portholes argent. The coat of arms corresponds to the seal of Alasdair Mac Dubhghaill, Lachlann's father-in-law, distant kinsman, and ally. Since the galley was a symbol of Clann Dubhghaill and seemingly Raghnall mac Somhairle—ancestor of Clann Ruaidhrí and Clann Domhnaill—it is conceivable that it was also a symbol of the Clann Somhairle progenitor, Somhairle mac Giolla Brighde. It was also a symbol of the Crovan dynasty, which could mean that it passed to Somhairle's family through his wife.)

Little else is known of Lachlann's activities until 1299. A report of an English spy at an important council of the Guardians of Scotland in August of this year reveals that news of devastations beyond the Firth of Forth committed by Lachlann and Alexander Comyn, younger brother of John Comyn, Earl of Buchan, was brought before leading Scottish magnates. According to the English informant, the severity of this news immediately quelled a heated quarrel that threatened the assembly itself. (Note: Although it is likely that the Alexander Comyn recorded in the spy's report is indeed a younger brother of the Earl of Buchan, another possibility is that he was instead the brother of Lachlann's ally, John Comyn II of Badenoch. In any case, Lachlann was certainly associated with the son of the earl in 1304.)

In June 1301, Edward I instructed the Admiral of the Cinque Ports, Gervase Alard, to take into the king's peace Alasdair Mac Dubhghaill, the latter's sons Eóin and Donnchadh, Lachlann himself, and Lachlann's wife and their followers. Although no evidence of the admiral's activities off Scotland's western seaboard survive for that year, it is apparent that this impending submission of Clann Dubhghaill was regarded by the English as significant enough to divert the fleet. Clann Dubhghaill's conciliation with the English Crown may have been undertaken merely as a means to improve the family's own position, or possibly conducted on account of the apparent success of Clann Domhnaill's actions against them.

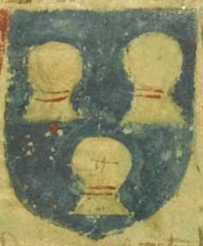
The arms of the Earl of Buchan depicted in Balliol Roll

In 1304, correspondence from John Strathbogie, Earl of Atholl to Edward I suggests that Lachlann was still working in concert with Alexander Comyn. John Strathbogie, evidently resentful of Alexander's appointment as Sheriff of Aberdeen, besought the English Crown not to allow him possession of Aboyne Castle as Alexander had not only two of the strongest castles in the north—Urquhart and Tarradale—but was working in league in Lachlann, who was then attempting boost his maritime forces by way of raising one galley of twenty oars per davoch of land. John Strathbogie's source of this information was William II and Thomas Dundee, Bishop of Ross. Although the earl did not identify the said lands, they would appear to have been Clann Ruaidhrí territories such as Uist, Barra, the Small Isles and perhaps Skye.

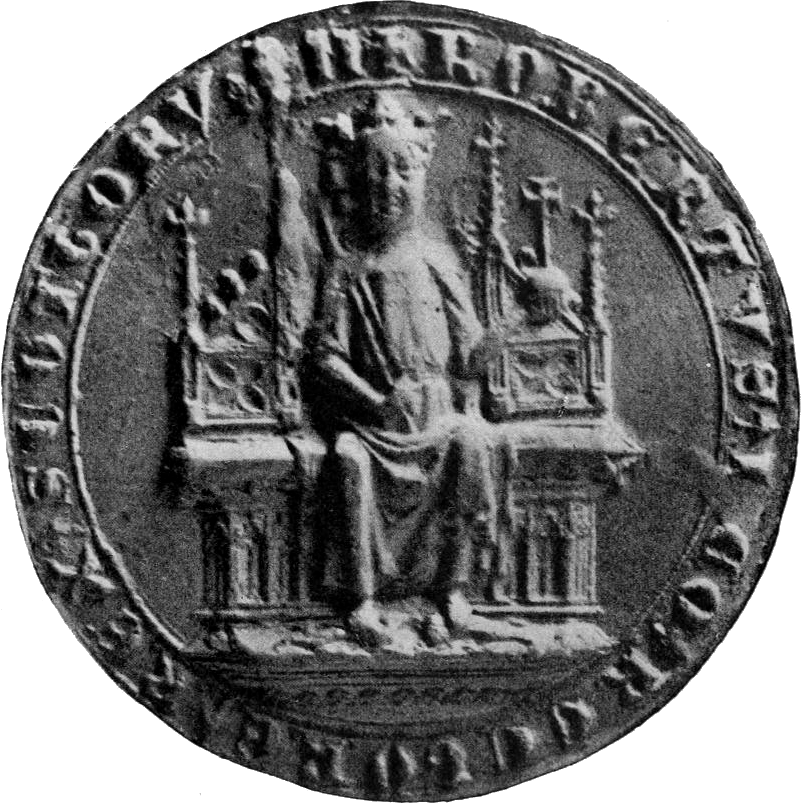
The seal of Robert I. After seizing the throne for himself, this embattled king appears to have partly owed his survival to efforts of Lachlann's sister, Cairistíona.

In February 1306, Robert Bruce VII, Earl of Carrick, a claimant to the Scottish throne, killed his chief rival to the kingship, John Comyn III of Badenoch. Although the former seized the throne (as Robert I) by March, the English Crown immediately struck back, defeating his forces in June. By September, Robert I was a fugitive, and appears to have escaped into the Hebrides. According to the fourteenth-century Gesta Annalia II, Lachlann's sister, Cairistíona, played an instrumental part in Robert I's survival at this low point in his career, sheltering him along Scotland's western seaboard. (Note: Cairistíona was closely associated with Robert I. One possibility is that her husband, Donnchadh, was a younger son of Uilleam, Earl of Mar. Another possibility is that Donnchadh was instead a son of Uilleam's son, Domhnall I, Earl of Mar. Certainly, Domhnall I's daughter, Iseabail, was the first wife of Robert I, and Domhnall I's son and comital successor, Gartnait, was the husband of a sister of Robert I. Cairistíona's connections with the Mar kindred may well account for her support of the Bruce cause.) In any event, later the next year, at about the time of Edward I's death in July 1307, Robert I mounted a remarkable return to power by first consolidating control of Carrick. In contrast to the evidence of assistance lent by Cairistíona to the Scottish king, Lachlann is recorded to have aligned himself closer with the English, as he appears to have personally sworn fealty to Edward I at Ebchester in August 1306, and petitioned for certain lands of Patrick Graham, a landholder forfeited from his estate for lending support to the Bruce cause. The document that preserves this petition records Lachlann's name as "Loughlā Mac Lochery des Isles". (Note: Patrick was a son-in-law of Lachlann's brother-in-law, Eóin Mac Dubhghaill. The location of the lands petitioned by Lachlann is unknown. They may have been located in the Hebrides or west Highlands.)

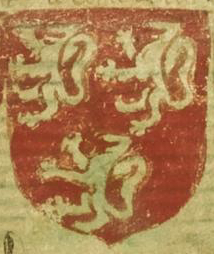
The arms of the Earl of Ross depicted in Balliol Roll

In October, there is evidence indicating that a certain Cristin del Ard delivered messages from the English Crown to William II, Lachlann, Ruaidhrí, and a certain Eóin Mac Neacail. The latter appears to be the earliest member of Clann Mhic Neacail on record. At about this time, this clan seems to have been seated on Skye and Lewis and Harris, and it is possible that the comital family of Ross had cultivated Clann Mhic Neacail as an ally against Clann Ruaidhrí shortly after the creation of the shrievalty of Skye in 1293. Cristin was a close associate of William II, and the fact that the English Crown seems to have used the earl as a conduit for communications with Clann Ruaidhrí and Clann Mhic Neacail appears to indicate that the earl had brought the northwestern territories of these families back within his sphere of influence. Whatever the case, William II played a key role in Robert I's misfortunes at about this time, as the earl captured the latter's wife and daughter—Elizabeth and Marjorie—and delivered them into the hands of Edward I. The correspondence could have concerned this particular episode, and may evince an attempt by the English Crown to project pro-English power into the Isles against Robert I and his supporters.

=== In opposition to the Earl of Ross ===
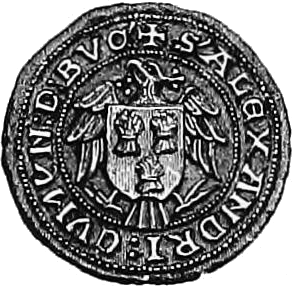
The seal of Alexander Comyn, Lachlann's ally

In 1303, after seven years of imprisonment, William II was released from captivity in England. It is possible that he had stubbornly refused to swear allegiance to the English until 1303, and that he only did so in a last attempt to safeguard what was left of his embattled earldom. It appears that, upon regaining his domain, one of the responsibilies William II was tasked with was to bring the Hebrides under control. However, he found himself facing a dangerous alliance between Alexander Comyn and the ever-strengthening Lachlann. This hostile front may account for the earl's part in John Strathbogie's correspondence to Edward I, as well as William II's 1304 communiqué to the king recounting his own part in combating Lachlann and other rebellious Hebrideans years before. Such correspondence suggest that the earl was attempting to instil doubts concerning the value of Lachlann and Alexander Comyn to English interests in the region, whilst highlighting his own usefulness. Certainly by 1306, the English Crown granted Alexander Comyn's former stronghold of Urquhart to William II himself.

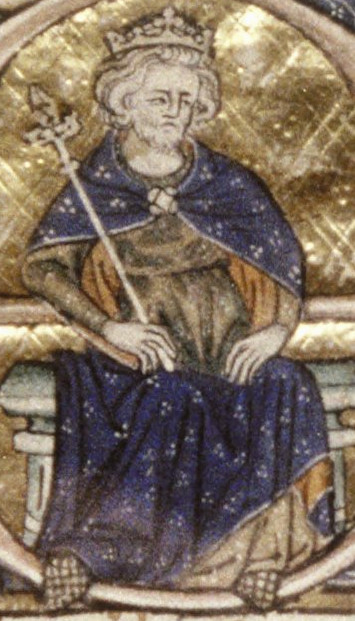
A fourteenth-century illumination of Edward II on folio 105r of Oxford Bodleian Library Rawlinson C 292

Lachlann last appears on record in 1307/1308 in correspondence between William II and Edward II, King of England. At the time, the earl appears to have found himself in a perilous position as the Earl of Buchan found himself the target of Robert I's attention late in 1307, and was soundly subdued by him in 1308. This consolidation of power by the Scottish Crown was evidently not William II's only concern, as he reported to Edward II that Lachlann refused to render to him the revenues that Lachlann owed to the English Crown. In the words of William II, Lachlann "is such a high and mighty lord, he'll not answer to anyone except under great force or through fear of you". The earl's letter is clearly a testimonial to the strength of Clann Ruaidhrí at this point in time, evidently comparable to that of the earl. In fact, it is possible that it was due to this kindred's considerable influence in the region that the Bruce cause found any support in Ross—support evidenced by a letter to the English Crown in 1307 relating the unease of the English adherents Duncan Frendraught, Reginald Cheyne, and Gilbert Glencarnie. Certainly, the fourteenth-century Chronicle of Lanercost reveals that Robert I received Hebridean support when he first launched his return from exile in Carrick/Galloway. Having been in conflict with William II for over decade, it appears that Lachlann and his kin capitalised on Robert I's campaign against the earl and his confederates. The Scottish king's success against William II may well have stemmed from leading Islesmen like Lachlann himself. In 1308, the earl submitted to Robert I, and thereby offset aggression from his Clann Ruaidhrí adversaries. Following Lachlann's last appearance on record, perhaps after his own demise, Ruaidhrí seems to have succeeded him in representation of Clann Ruaidhrí.

== Succession ==
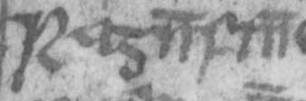
The name of Lachlann's son as it appears on folio 1v of National Library of Scotland Advocates' 72.1.1 (MS 1467): "Ragnall finn"

Ruaidhrí appears to have only gained control of the lordship after swearing allegiance to Robert I. Specifically, at some during the king's reign, Cairistíona resigned her claims with the condition that, if Ruaidhrí died without a male heir, and her like-named son married one of Ruaidhrí's daughters, Cairistíona's son would secure the inheritance. Although there is uncertainty as to why the king allowed Ruaidhrí consolidate control of the kindred over his own close associate Cairistíona, it is apparent that Ruaidhrí's faithful service to the king ensured the continuation of his kindred.

At about the turn of the twentieth century, partisan historians of Clann Domhnaill portrayed Lachlann and his kin as "Highland rovers", and likened their exploits against Clann Domhnaill to the "piratical tendencies of the ancient Vikings". Later in twentieth-century historical literature, Lachlann was still regarded a "sinister figure", likened to a "buccaneering predator", and described as a "shadowy figure ... always in the background, always a troublemaker". Such summarisations of their lives are nevertheless oversimplifications of their recorded careers as vigorous regional lords. According to the fifteenth-century manuscript National Library of Scotland Advocates' 72.1.1 (MS 1467), Lachlann had a son named Raghnall.

== Ancestry ==
Ancestors of Lachlann Mac Ruaidhrí

16. Somhairle mac Giolla Brighde (died 1164)
8. Raghnall mac Somhairle (died 1191/1192 – c. 1210/1227)
17. Ragnhildr Óláfsdóttir
4. Ruaidhrí mac Raghnaill (died 1247?)
2. Ailéan mac Ruaidhrí (died ×1296)
1. Lachlann Mac Ruaidhrí (fl. 1297 – 1307/1308)
