= Alexander Comyn (died 1308) =

13th-14th century Scottish noble

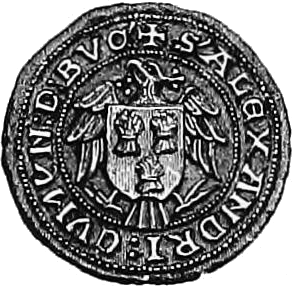
Seal of Alexander Comyn.

Alexander Comyn (died 1308), Sheriff of Aberdeen was a fourteenth-century Scottish nobleman. He was a younger son of Alexander Comyn, Earl of Buchan. The latter died in 1290, whereupon the earldom of Buchan was inherited by Alexander's elder brother, John (died 1308).

Alexander was married to Joanna Latimer, possibly a daughter of William Latimer, with whom he had issue Alice and Margaret. Alice married Henry de Beaumont, son of Louis of Brienne and Agnès de Beaumont, Vicomte of Beaumont. Margaret married firstly John Ross son of William II, Earl of Ross and secondly William Lindsay of Symertoun. Alexander was Sheriff of Aberdeen in 1297–1304. During the First War of Scottish Independence, Alexander is recorded to have campaigned with Lachlann Mac Ruaidhrí (fl. 1297–1307/1308).

Alexander died in 1308, not long before the death of his brother John, who had no children by his own wife. The title to the earldom, thereafter, passed to Alexander's daughters, Alice and Margaret.
