= Delny Castle =

Former Scottish castle

- Delny, Highland, Scotland

Location
- Delny Castle
- Coordinates: 57.723031°N 4.126384°W

Delny Castle was a castle near the hamlet of Delny, Highland in Scotland.

== History ==
Held by the MacTaggert Earls of Ross until the late 14th century. Both William II, Earl of Ross (died c.1323) and William III, Earl of Ross (died 1372) are known to have died at the castle. The castle passed to the Munro family in the early 16th century.

The location of the castle is yet to be identified.
