= Auldearn Castle =

Former Scottish castle

- Auldearn, Highland, Scotland

Location
- Auldearn Castle
- Coordinates: 57.5776110°N 3.8123252°W

Site history
- Built: 12th century

Auldearn Castle (Note: Also known as Castle Of Auldearn, Auldearn Motte and Boath Motte) was a castle near the village of Auldearn, Highland in Scotland.

== History ==
Constructed as an earth and timber motte-and-bailey castle during the reign of William the Lion in the late 12th century. The castle was handed over by the constable Gillecolm de Madderty to Donald Meic Uilleim during a revolt in Moray in 1187. It was a royal castle used by the Scottish Crown. The castle was the site of the fealty of William, Earl of Ross to King Robert the Bruce in 1308.
