= Alexander Dunbar =

17th century preacher

Personal life
- Education: King's College, Aberdeen

Religious life
- Religion: Christianity
- School: Presbyterianism

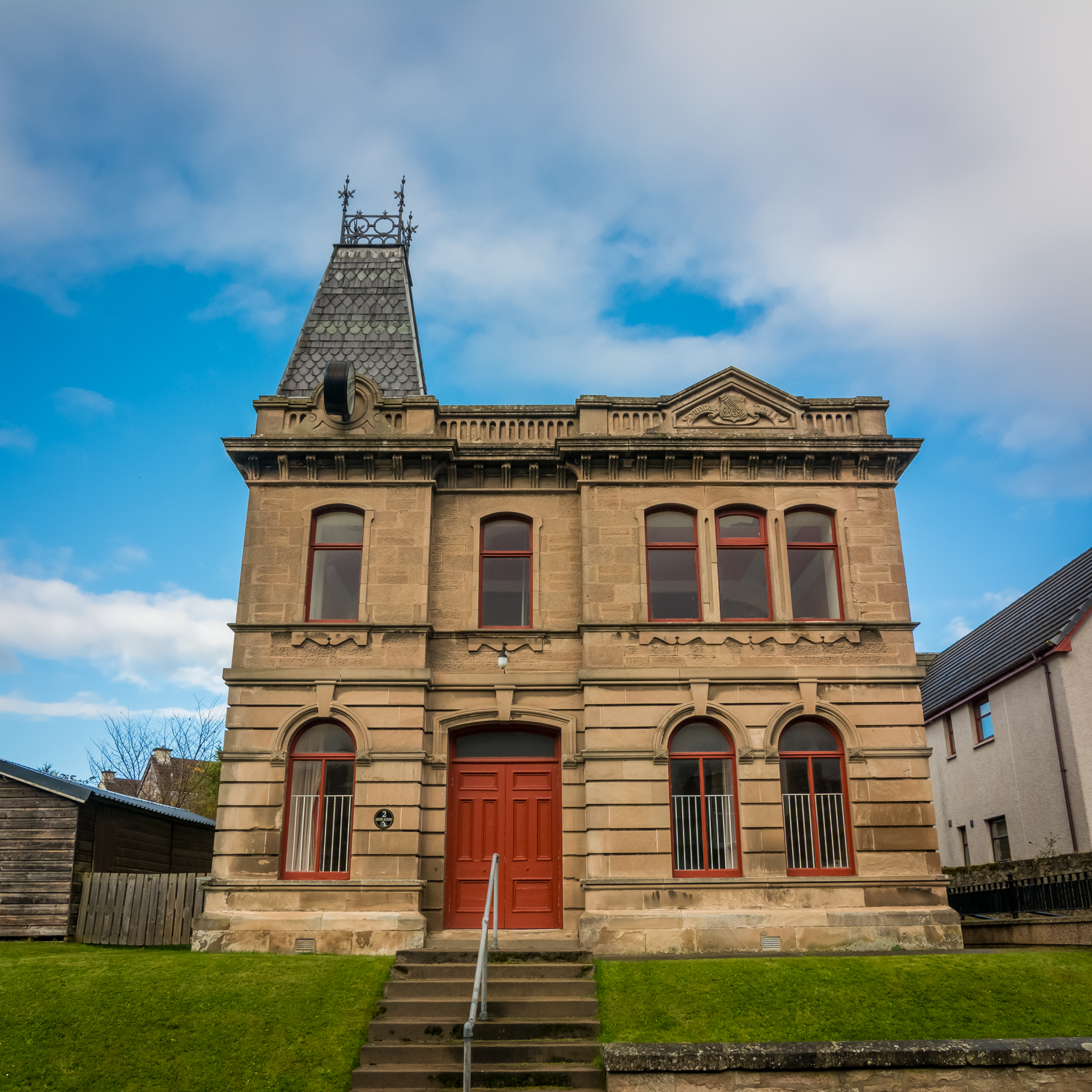
Dunbar Memorial Hall, Auldearn

Alexander Dunbar was a Covenanting field preacher and school teacher. He was imprisoned on the Bass Rock for about a year between 1685 and 1686.

== Early life ==
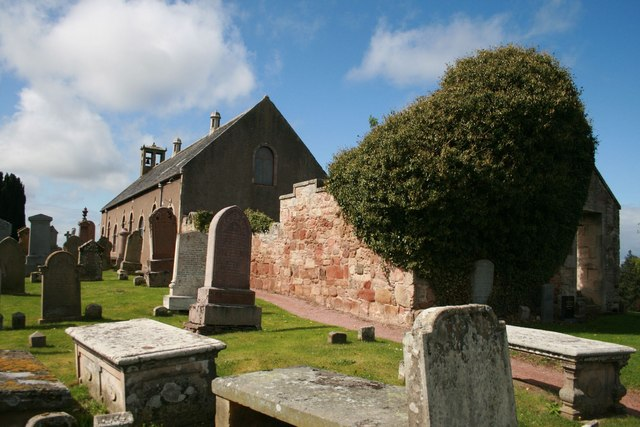
Auldearn Church

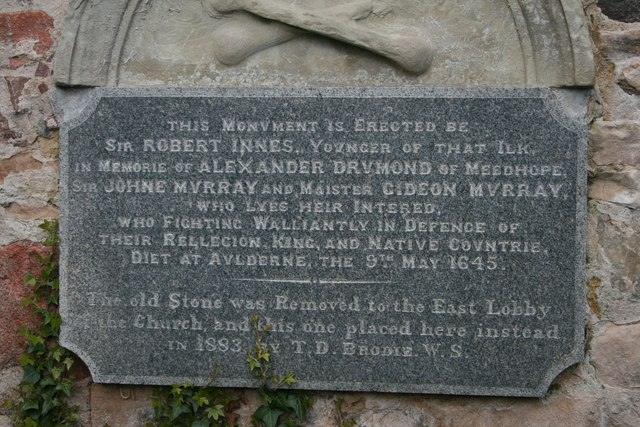
Covenanters Grave, Auldearn

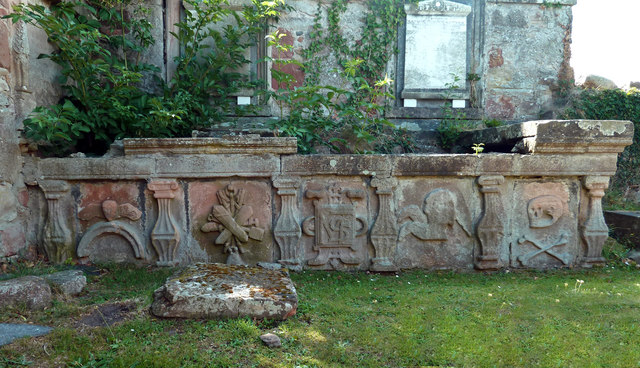
Symbolic Panels in Auldearn Graveyard

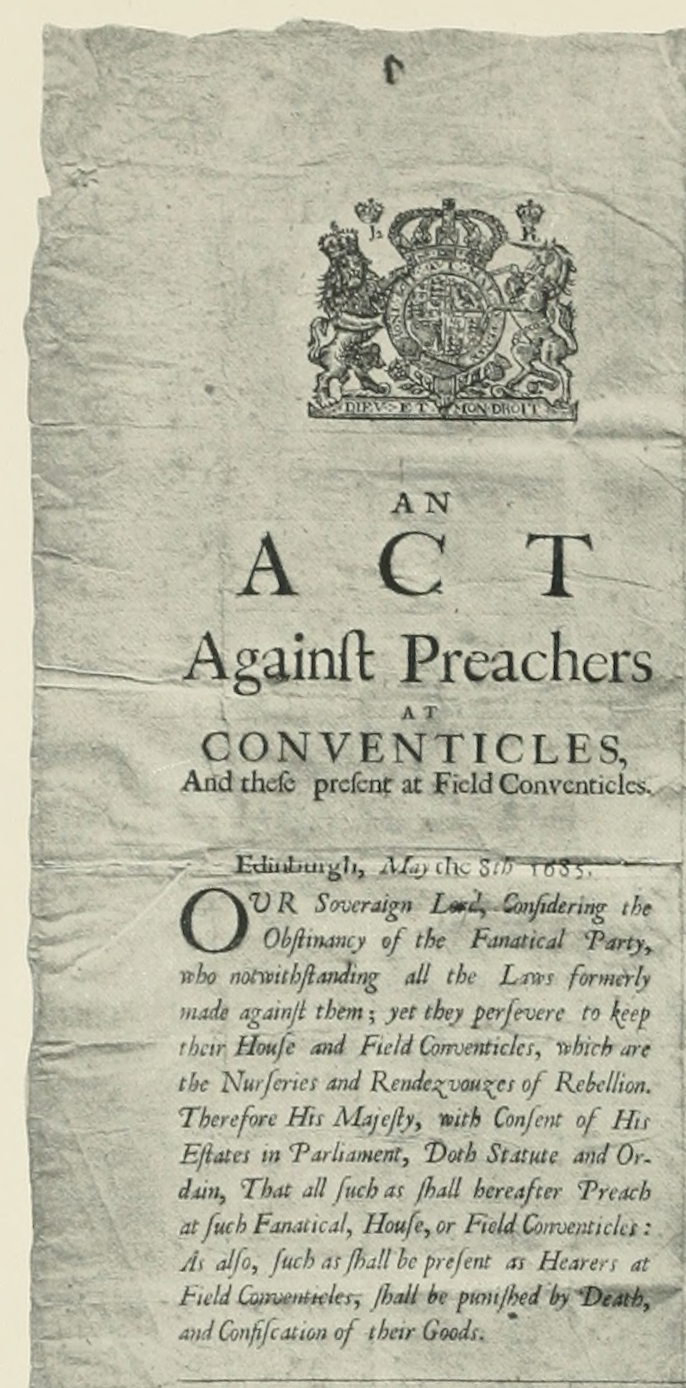
The Scottish Parliament on 8 May 1685, have recorded the following : Our sovereign Lord, considering the obstinacy of the fanatical party who, notwithstanding all the laws formerly made against them, still keep their house and field conventicles, which are the nurseries and rendezvouses of rebellion; therefore His Majesty, with consent of Parliament, ordains that all such persons who shall hereafter preach at such house or field conventicles, also those who shall be present as hearers, shall be punished by death and confiscation of their goods.

Alexander Dunbar was born about 1645, the same year as the Battle of Auldearn. He was probably son of John Dunbar, minister of Edinkillie. He graduated from King's College, Aberdeen, with an M.A. in 1661. He was a school master at Auldearn from 1666 to 1670. He became chaplain and tutor at Kilravock.

== Ministry ==
Having completed his student curriculum, he was licensed by a few of the "outed ministers," at Edinburgh, in 1682. He was ordained before 13 July 1678. Immediately, after being licensed, he began preaching which he assiduously carried on until the beginning of 1685, when he was apprehended. The indictment, which was a somewhat serious one, charged him with "keeping conventicles, withdrawing from the ordinances, inculcating seditious doctrine, plotting against the Government, supplying and harbouring rebels, and other public crimes and irregularities." When examined before a Committee of the Privy Council, at Elgin, in the beginning of the year 1685, he admitted that he had not attended the Parish Kirk and had officiated several times in private houses. He also refused to take the oath of allegiance to King James. Dunbar was, therefore, sentenced to penal servitude amid the plantations of the West being banished by the Privy Council 2 March 1685. His transportation, however, never was carried into effect. In lieu thereof, he was conveyed a prisoner to the Bass, in February 1685, where he remained one full year, after which he regained his liberty on the ground of the impaired state of his health.

== After the toleration ==
On 6 July 1687, he was acknowledged by the Presbyterian ministers of Lothian at their first meeting after the Toleration. He was admitted to Auldern in 1689. Dunbar was a member of Assembly in the years 1690 and 1692. He died after an illness of three years, on 29 October 1707. Macdonald said his life and ministry in Auldearn were in thorough consistency with the testimony which he bore for the truth in imprisonment and in bonds. Sir Hugh Campbell of Cawdor refers to him in his book on the Lord's Prayer, as "the holy Mr Alexander Dunbar, minister of Auldearn." He left 200 merks to provide silver communion cups for the parish.

== Family ==
He married (1) Margaret Meldrum, who died 29 September 1689 and (2) Beatrix Fowler, who survived him.

== Bibliography ==
- Wodrow s Hist., iv., 196
- Moray Tests.
- Brodie's Diary.
