= Thomas Pringle McDonald =

Thomas Pringle McDonald QC (18 August 1901 – 23 July 1969), was a Scottish lawyer and Liberal Party politician. He was Sheriff of Aberdeen, Kincardine and Banff.

== Background ==
McDonald was born the son of James McDonald. He was educated at George Watson's College and Edinburgh University. In 1930 he married Harriet Selby McDowall. They had one son and two daughters.

== Professional career ==
McDonald was a member of the Scottish bar and became a Scottish King's council in 1948. He was Sheriff of Aberdeen, Kincardine and Banff from 1954-1969.

== Political career ==
McDonald was first active in politics at Edinburgh University where he was President of the Student's Representative Council and President of the University's Liberal Association. He was Liberal candidate for the Edinburgh East division at the 1929 General Election. Edinburgh East had been a Liberal seat until it was lost to Labour in 1924. In that bad election for the party, his predecessor finished third. McDonald was able to overtake the Unionist candidate but unable to defeat the sitting Labour MP. He did not stand for Parliament again.

=== Electoral record ===
General Election 1929: Edinburgh East
Party	Candidate	Votes	%	±%
Labour	Drummond Shiels	13,933	47.2	+5.3
Liberal	Thomas Pringle McDonald	8,687	29.4	+1.5
Unionist	Richard Cobden Thyne	6,889	23.3	−4.6
Majority		5,246	17.8	+6.1
Turnout		29,509		
Labour hold		Swing	+1.9	
