= Auldearn =

Coordinates: 57.576481°N 3.815948°W

Auldearn: Scottish Gaelic: Allt Èireann
- Location within the Nairn area
- Population: 720 (2020)
- OS grid reference: NH915555
- Council area: Highland
- Country: Scotland
- Sovereign state: United Kingdom
- Post town: NAIRN
- Postcode district: IV12
- Dialling code: 01667
- Police: Scotland
- Fire: Scottish
- Ambulance: Scottish

Auldearn (Scottish Gaelic: Allt Èireann) is a village situated east of the River Nairn, just outside Nairn in the Highland council area of Scotland. It takes its name from William the Lion's castle of Eren (Old Eren), built there in the 12th century.

Auldearn is an expanding area, with much development in the last 10 years. It has a small garden in the centre of the village called the Rose Gardens where people, old and young, gather. From Castle Hill, a motte of a former royal castle, there is a view all around for miles.

Auldearn has one hotel, a pub and a small primary school. The village shop & post office was removed in 2021.

== History ==
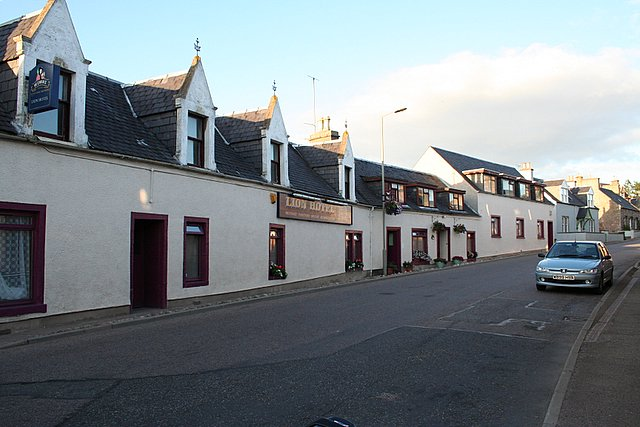
The Lion Hotel

Auldearn was the site of a battle in May 1645 (Battle of Auldearn), in which the MacLennans participated on the side of the Covenanters under their chief Ruaridh, as referred to in Sorley MacLean's poem "Heroes". The Royalists under Montrose won the day – with Clan Donald playing a major part in the battle, as is evidenced by the waulking song Clann Domhnuill an Cogadh Righ Tearlach I.

A local woman, Isobel Gowdie, was tried for witchcraft in 1662 along with others male and female. She made detailed confessions about the activities of her coven. She described her initiation by the devil in Auldearn Kirk as well as meetings with the King and Queen of Elfhane. Her account is fascinating for the evidence it provides of the mixing of folk beliefs with Christian ideas about witchcraft. She is assumed to have been executed but there is no record of the event.

Following the formation of the Territorial Force in 1908, the town, for recruiting, was granted to the 4th Battalion, The Queen's Own Cameron Highlanders. Following this formation, a platoon from B Company was stationed here. Today the 4th (Highlanders) Battalion, The Royal Regiment of Scotland recruit from the area.

There was a Post Office repeater station on the outskirts of the village which was one of only two in the Highland area classed as being of "key importance to national defence" and a "most important link in the A.D.G.B. It is incorrectly described as a radio station in the document and also now marked incorrectly as an "old telephone exchange". It is believed that it was a link from the RAF Sector Operations Centre at Raigmore.

== Places of interest ==
- The Rose Gardens: Auldearn has a small square at its centre named the Rose gardens, these were refurbished in 2003 and now have benches, flowerbeds and a small shelter.
- The Doocot: On top of Castle hill, there is a 17th-century pigeon loft named the Doocot or Dovecot. Inside it has hundreds of small recesses for pigeons to nest in. It was used to feed the Dunbar family of Boath in the wintertime if food was scarce. It is now looked after by the National Trust for Scotland.

== Farming controversy ==
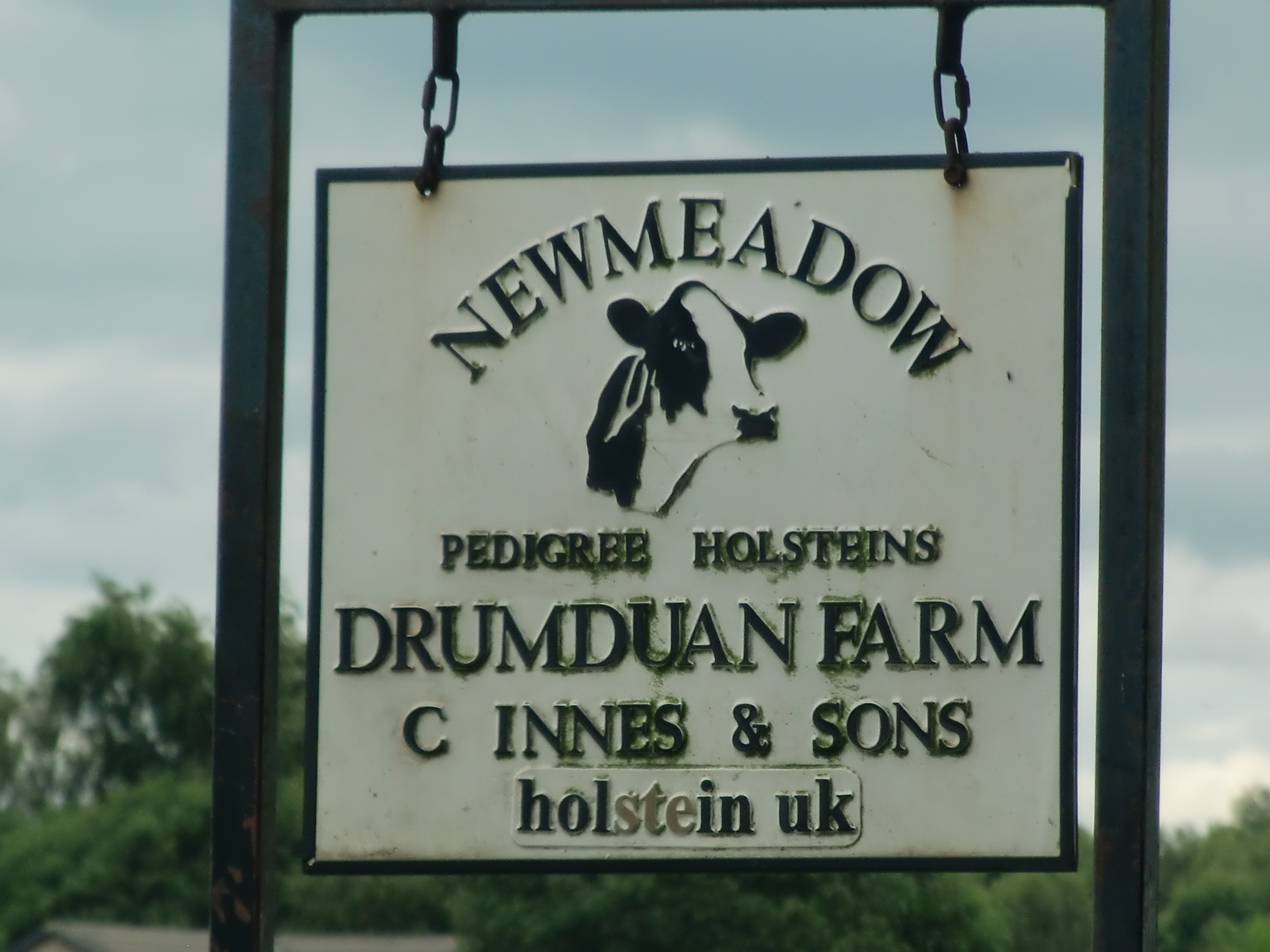
Sign outside Newmeadow farm, Auldearn

In 2010 it was reported that meat from a bull grown from the embryo of a cow cloned in the US and reared on a local farm had entered the food chain. Newmeadow herd, based at Drumduan Farm, is the largest Holstein cattle herd in the Highlands.

== See also ==
- Alexander Dunbar – Auldearn schoolteacher and minister imprisoned on the Bass Rock
