= Sheriff of Kincardine =

The Sheriff of Kincardine, also known as The Mearns, was historically a royal appointment, held at pleasure, which carried the responsibility for enforcing justice in Kincardine, Scotland. Prior to 1748 most sheriffdoms were held on a hereditary basis. From that date, following the Jacobite uprising of 1745, the hereditary sheriffs were replaced by salaried sheriff-deputes, qualified advocates who were members of the Scottish Bar.

Following a general merger of the sheriffdoms in 1870 the position became the Sheriff of Aberdeen and Kincardine.

== Sheriffs ==
- Osbert Olifard (c. 1160)
- John de Hastinkes, Lord of Dun (1163-1178)
- Robert de Inverkeilor (c. 1198)
- Robert Senescald (1214-1225)
- Philip de Melville, Lord of Mondynes (1222-1240)
- John Wishart (1230)
- Reginald le Chen (1263)
- Robert le Chen (1263-1266)
- Reginald le Chen (1266)
- Reginald le Chen (1290)
- Alexander de Abernethy (1305)
- Richard de Dummor (1305)
- Alexander de Stratoun, Lord of Lauriston (1328)
- Alexander Fraser (1330)
- Simon Fraser (1337)
- Robert de Keith (1348-1358)
- William de Keith (1359-1391)
  - Robert Burnard - Deputy (1391)
- Robert de Keith, Lord of Troup (1406-1407)
- William Keith (1442)
  - Alexander Ogilvy of Inverquharity - Deputy (1443)
  - Patrick Barclay - Deputy (1448)
- John de Melville of Glenbervie (1420)
- William Keith, 1st Earl Marischal (1470)
- William Keith, 2nd Earl Marischal (1483)
- William Keith, 3rd Earl Marischal (1492)
- William Keith, 4th Earl Marischal (1525)
- William Keith, Lord Keith (1621)

Sheriffs-Depute

- Arthur Sheppard, 1728–1748?
- Francis Garden, Lord Gardenstone, 1748–1760?
- James Burnet, 1760–1767?
- Walter Campbell of Shawfield, 1767–1777
- John Scott, 1777–1780?
- John Ramsay, 1780–1783
- Alexander Gordon, 1784–1806?
- Adam Gillies, 1806–1811
- George Douglas, 1812–1847?
- Archibald Davidson, 1847–1848 (Sheriff of Aberdeen, 1848)
- John Cowan, 1848–1851
- John Montgomerie Bell, 1852–1862
- Alexander Burns Shand, 1862–1869 (Sheriff of Haddington and Berwick, 1869-1872}
- For sheriffs after 1870 see Sheriff of Aberdeen and Kincardine.

== See also ==
- Historical development of Scottish sheriffdoms
