= Delny =

Coordinates: 57.7207°N 4.1505°W

Delny: Scottish Gaelic: Deilgnidh
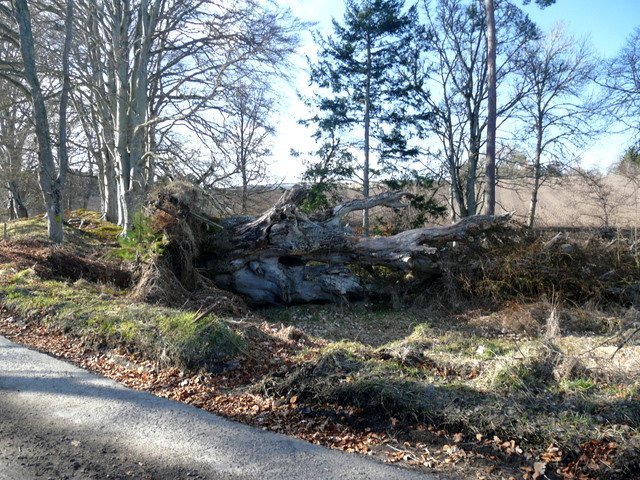

- Location within the Ross and Cromarty area
- OS grid reference: NH720721
- Civil parish: Kilmuir-Easter
- Council area: Highland
- Lieutenancy area: Ross and Cromarty
- Country: Scotland
- Sovereign state: United Kingdom
- Post town: Tain
- Postcode district: IV18 0
- Police: Scotland
- Fire: Scottish
- Ambulance: Scottish

Delny (Scottish Gaelic: Deilgnidh) is a small hamlet in the parish of Kilmuir-Easter in Ross-shire, Scotland. It was the site of a castle, that was once the seat of the Earl of Ross.
