= Sheriff of Aberdeen =

The Sheriff of Aberdeen was a royal official who was responsible for enforcing justice in Aberdeenshire, Scotland. Prior to 1748 most sheriffdoms were held on a hereditary basis. From that date, following the Jacobite uprising of 1745, they were replaced by salaried sheriff-deputies, qualified advocates who were members of the Scottish Bar.

In 1870 the sheriffdom was merged with that of Kincardineshire to create the post of Sheriff of Aberdeen and Kincardine. The combined sheriffdom then absorbed Banffshire in 1882 to create the post of Sheriff of Aberdeen, Kincardine and Banff.

This sheriffdom was abolished in 1975 and replaced by the current Sheriffdom of Grampian, Highland and Islands.

== Sheriffs of Aberdeen ==
- Philip de Melville, 1221
- William Prat, 1246
- Gregory de Melville, before 1263
- Andrew of Garioch, 1264
- William de Meldrum, 1290
- Henry de Latham, (England) 1297
- John of Strathbogie, Earl of Atholl, 1299–1300
- Alexander Comyn, 1303
- Robert II Keith, Marischal of Scotland, 1304–1305
- Alexander Comyn, 1305
- Norman Leslie, 1305
- Walter de Barclay, 1320–1324
- John Drimmmyng, 1325
- John Brown, 1328
- Robert III Keith, Marischal of Scotland, 1335
- John de Bonneville, 1337
- Andrew Fraser of Ewnysedale, 1342
- Robert III Keith, Marischal of Scotland, 1342-1343
- Alexander Fraser of Ewynesdale, 1343
- William de Meldrum, 1347–1358
  - Phillip Dumbeck – 1348 – Deputy
- William de Lidell, 1358
- Walter Maule, 1364
- Alexander Fraser of Philorth, 1369–1399
  - Phillip Dumbeck – 1369 – Deputy
- John Forbes, 1373
- Patrick of Crawford, 1381
  - Thomas Norrie – 1389 – Deputy
- John Fraser of Forglen, 1382
- Alexander Fraser, 1391
- David Lindsay, 1st Earl of Crawford, 1400–1408
- Walter Lindsay of Kinneff, 1417–1423
- Alexander Lindsay, 2nd Earl of Crawford, 1421–1439
- David Lindsay, 3rd Earl of Crawford, 1439–1445
  - Alexander Forbes – 1440 – Deputy
- Alexander Lindsay, 4th Earl of Crawford, 1445–1453
- Alexander Gordon, 1st Earl of Huntly, 1453
  - Alexander Douglas- 1454 – Deputy
- Walter Lindsay of Kinblathmont, 1457
  - Walter Lindsay of Bewford – 1459 – Deputy
- David Lindsay, 1st Duke of Montrose, 1461–1495
  - John Ogston – 1467–1469 – Deputy
  - Alexander Irvine of Drum – 1469 – Deputy
- Alexander Lindsay, Master of Crawford, 1474
  - Alexander Bannerman – 1498 – Deputy
- John Lindsay, 6th Earl of Crawford
- William Hay, 4th Earl of Erroll (died 1513)
- William Hay, 5th Earl of Erroll (died 1522)
- William Hay, 6th Earl of Erroll (died 1541)
- Alexander Gordon, 3rd Earl of Huntly (died 1524)
- Alexander Ogilvy of that ilk
- James Stewart, Earl of Moray
- David Lindsay, 8th Earl of Crawford
- George Gordon, 4th Earl of Huntly (died 1562)
- William Leslie, 9th of Balquhain
- George Gordon, 5th Earl of Huntly (died 1576)
- John Leslie, 10th of Balquhain
- George Gordon, 1st Marquess of Huntly, -1630
- Sir George Johnston of that ilk, 1630–1631
- Sir Alexander Irvine of Drum, 1634–
- Alexander Forbes, 1st Lord Forbes of Pitsligo (died 1636)
- Sir Thomas Crombie of Kemnay
- Sir William Forbes of Craigievar
- William Keith, 7th Earl Marischal
- William Forbes, 11th Lord Forbes (died 1697)

Sheriffs-depute

- William Forbes, 1728-
- Alexander Grant of Grantsfield 1741–
- David Dalrymple, Lord Westhall, 1748–1777
- Alexander Elphinstone of Glack, 1777–1795
- Alexander Moir, 1795-1822
- Andrew Murray, 1822-1847
- John Thomson Gordon, 1847–1848 (Sheriff of Edinburgh, 1848-)
- Archibald Davidson, 1848–1865 (Sheriff of Edinburgh, 1865–)
- Andrew Jameson, 1865–1870

== Sheriffs of Aberdeen and Kincardine (1870) ==
- Andrew Jameson, 1865–1870
- John Guthrie Smith, 1870–1882

== Sheriffs of Aberdeen and Kincardine and Banff (1882) ==
- John Guthrie Smith, 1882–1895
- Donald Crawford, 1895–1911
- John Campbell Lorimer, 1911–1920
- Alexander Logan McClure, 1920–1932
- (Sir) George Morton, 1932–1953
- James Walker, 1953–54
- Thomas Pringle McDonald, 1954–1969
- Interim appointment of Sheriff F.W.F. O'Brien, 1969–1971
- Alexander Mackenzie Stuart, Baron Mackenzie-Stuart, 1971–1972
- George Stanley Gimson, 1972–1975 (Sheriff Principal of Grampian, Highland and Islands, 1975-1982)
- Sheriffdom abolished in 1975 and replaced by the sheriffdom of Grampian, Highland and Islands.

== See also ==
- Historical development of Scottish sheriffdoms
