= Sheriff of Skye =

The Sheriff of Skye was historically the royal official responsible for enforcing law and order in Skye, Scotland and bringing criminals to justice. The sheriffdom was created in 1293 by King John of Scotland in an effort to maintain peace in the western reaches of his realm.

== Sheriffs of Skye ==
- William II, Earl of Ross 1293-??

== Citations and References ==
Citations

- Brown, M (2004). The Wars of Scotland, 1214–1371. The New Edinburgh History of Scotland (series vol. 4). Edinburgh: Edinburgh University Press. ISBN 0748612386 – via Google Books.
- Brown, M (2011). "Aristocratic Politics and the Crisis of Scottish Kingship, 1286–96". Scottish Historical Review. 90 (1): 1–26. doi:10.3366/shr.2011.0002. eISSN 1750-0222. ISSN 0036-9241.
- Cochran-Yu, DK (2015). A Keystone of Contention: The Earldom of Ross, 1215–1517 (PhD thesis). University of Glasgow – via Glasgow Theses Service.
- Stell, GP (October 2005). "John [John de Balliol] (c. 1248x50–1314)". Oxford Dictionary of National Biography (online ed.). Oxford University Press. doi:10.1093/ref:odnb/1209. (Subscription or UK public library membership required.)
