= William II, Earl of Ross =

Earl of Ross

William
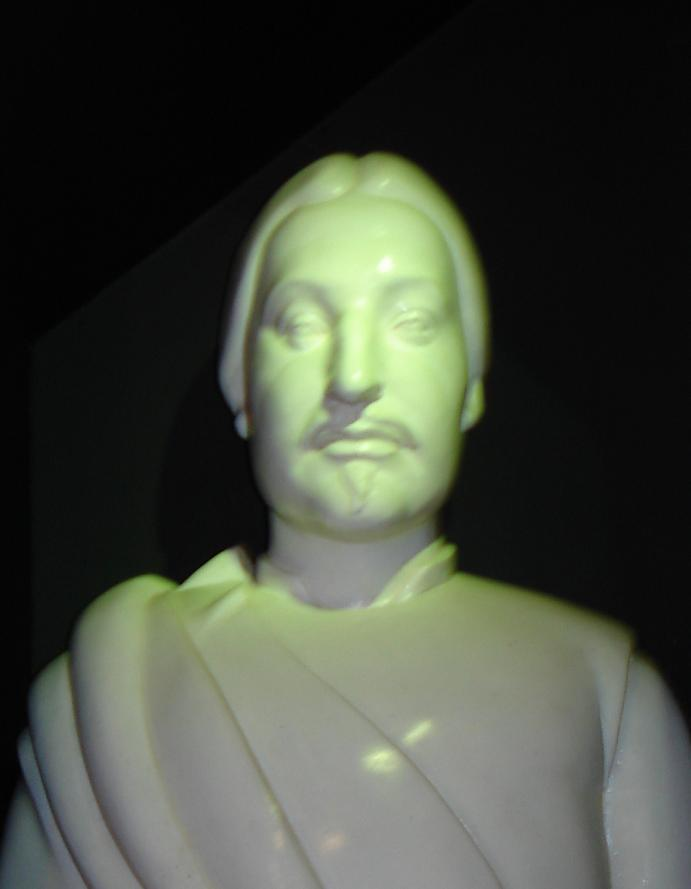
- A bust of William, made for display in the Tain & District Museum
- Mormaerdom: Ross
- Successor: Hugh, Earl of Ross
- Born: bef. 1274
- Died: c. 1323; Delny, Ross-shire, Scotland
- Family: Ross
- Wife: Euphemia
- Father: William I, Earl of Ross

William II, Earl of Ross (Gaelic: Uilleam; died c. 1323) was ruler of the province of Ross in northern Scotland, and a prominent figure in the Wars of Scottish Independence.

William was the only child of William I, Earl of Ross and his wife Jean Comyn, daughter of William, Earl of Buchan. He succeeded to the earldom on the death of his father in 1274. In 1284 he joined with other Scottish noblemen who acknowledged Margaret, Maid of Norway as the heir to the unfortunate Alexander III. Following Margaret's death, he sided alternately with the Scottish and English interests. In 1291 he paid homage to Edward I of England at Berwick recognising him as overlord of Scotland. He was chosen as an auditor at the trial between John Balliol and Robert Bruce, when they competed before Edward to decide who would take the throne of Scotland.

William was one of the leaders of the Scottish army at the Battle of Dunbar in 1296, when Edward invaded Scotland to punish John Balliol for refusing to support the English invasion of France. After the Scottish defeat, he was captured by the English and sent to the Tower of London, where he remained until September 1303, when an order was issued for his escort to Scotland. He reached Perth in December, and stayed there with Edward, Prince of Wales until he was sent home in February. Later in 1304 he was with King Edward at Dunfermline, who bestowed upon him a horse, armour, and other presents, as well as appointing him Warden beyond the Spey.

In 1306, Robert's wife Elizabeth, his daughter Marjorie, and other Bruce supporters took refuge from the advancing English army in the chapel of St Duthac at Tain in Ross, while on their way to the safety of Orkney. However, William violated the sanctuary, took them prisoner, and handed them over to the English. They were sent as prisoners to England where two of the women were caged outdoors for four years, and the women were not liberated until 1314.

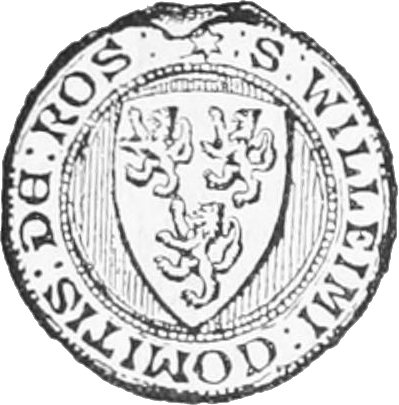
William's seal

Coat of arms of the Earls of Ross

This put William in a dangerous position when the Bruce revival began in the same year, 1306. The Earl of Ross found himself being attacked by King Robert in the south, and by Lachlann Mac Ruaidhrí in the west. Toward the end of 1307, the earl submitted to King Robert at Urquhart Castle on Loch Ness, which Ross had been holding for King Edward II. King Robert allowed Ross a truce until the summer of the following year, gaining King Robert Caithness, Sutherland and Ross. In allowing the truce, King Robert showed mercy, considering Ross had betrayed the queen and Bruce's sisters who were being treated wretchedly by King Edward. In 1308, Edward II wrote to Ross, thanking him for his services and requesting further aid. But, in that same year, Ross submitted to King Robert at Auldearn Castle. William later wrote to Edward apologizing for the submission to King Robert, and requesting help to repel his invasion of Ross.

Nevertheless, William is one of the eight earls whose name appears on the Declaration of Arbroath of 1320, which was sent to the Pope requesting he recognise Scotland's independence, which he did. William died three years later, at Delny in Ross. He had married a lady named Euphemia, who was likely the daughter of Sir Hugh de Berkeley, Justiciar of Lothian. They had three sons and two daughters:

- Hugh, Earl of Ross
- Sir John Ross, married Margaret Comyn, daughter of John, Earl of Buchan
- Sir Walter Ross, killed at Bannockburn
- Isabella Ross, married Edward Bruce, Earl of Carrick
- Dorothea Ross, married Torquil MacLeod of Lewis
