= Chiefs of Clan MacDonell of Glengarry =

Coat of arms of Glengarry, Chief of Clan MacDonell of Glengarry.

The Scottish Highland Clan MacDonell of Glengarry is a branch of the Clan Donald. The clan chiefs of the Clan MacDonell of Glengarry were originally seated at Strome Castle but later moved to Invergarry Castle. The current chief of the Clan MacDonell of Glengarry is Patrick MacDonell, 24th Chief of MacDonell of Glengarry.

The following is a list of the chiefs who have headed the Clan MacDonell of Glengarry, they descend from the early chiefs of Clan Ranald and the high Clan Donald.

Name (+ Gaelic Name)	Dates of chieftaincy	Further info
Ranald of the Isles, 1st chief. (Raghnall nan Eilein)	1380–1386	Chief of both Clan MacDonnell of Glengarry and Clan Ranald. Married a daughter of Walter Stewart, Earl of Athol.
Donald MacRanald or Ranaldson, 2nd chief. (Dòmhnall Mac Raghnuill)	1386–1420	Second son of Ranald of the Isles (his elder brother Allan succeeded as chief of Clan Ranald). Donald first married a daughter of the chief of Clan MacIver from which his first son John and secondly married a daughter of Lord Fraser of Lovat from which his second son, Alexander of the Woods.
John MacDonald, 3rd chief. (Iain Mac Dòmhnaill Mhic Raghnuill)	1420 – ?	Of which little is known, succeeded by his younger half-brother, Alexander.
Alexander of the Woods, 4th chief (Alasdair na Coille)	? – 1460	Married Mary, a daughter of Hector MacLean of Duart.
John Ranaldsoune, 5th chief. (Iain Mac Alasdair Mhic Dhòmhnuill)	1460–1501	Married his cousin, a daughter of Cameron of Lochiel, whose mother was a daughter of Hector Mor MacLean of Duart. John the 5th chief of Glengarry was killed by Fraser of Lovat after being invited to a meeting with him.
Alexander Ranaldson, 6th chief . (Alasdair Mac Iain Mhic Alasdair)	1501–1560	Fought at the Battle of the Shirts against Clan Fraser in 1544. Married Margaret MacDonald, daughter of MacDonald of Lochalsh. One of seventeen chiefs who formed Donald’s council, his signature appears a commission of the Lord of the Isles of Scotland to a treaty with the King of England in 1545.
Angus Mac Alasdair, 7th chief (Aonghas Aluinn)	1560–1574	Married firstly Janet, daughter of Hector Og MacLean of Duart, secondly Margaret, daughter of MacLeod of Dunvegan and thirdly Mary, daughter of Mackenzie of Kintail.
Donald Mac Angus, 8th chief (Dòmhnall Mac Aonghais)	1574–1645	Married firstly Helen, daughter of Grant 4th of Freuchie, secondly Margaret, daughter of Allan MacDonald, 9th chief of Clan Ranald.
Alexander Aneas, Lord MacDonald and Aros, 9th chief (Aonghas Mac Alasdair Dheirg)	1645–1680	Fought under James Graham, 1st Marquess of Montrose at the Battle of Inverlochy (1645) and the Battle of Auldearn. Later fought under the Earl of Glencairn during the Royalist rising of 1651 to 1654. Succeeded by his cousin.
Ranald MacDonell, 2nd of Scotus, 10th chief.	1680–1705	Cousin of previous chief. Married Flora, daughter of John MacLeod of Drynoch.
Alasdair Dubh, 1st of Titular, Lord MacDonald, 11th chief. (Alasdair Dubh Ghlinne Garraidh)	1705–1721	Fought at the Battle of Killiecrankie under Graham of Cleverhouse in 1689, Battle of Sheriffmuir 1715, surrendering to John Murray, 1st Duke of Atholl, at Huntingtower in April 1716. He was not with his clansmen at the Battle of Glenshiel in 1719. Married firstly Ann, daughter of Fraser of Lovat, secondly Mary, daughter of Kenneth Mor Mackenzie, 3rd Earl of Seaforth from whom his successor.
John, 2nd of Titular, Lord MacDonald, 12th chief. (Iain Mac Alasdair Dubh)	1721–1754	Fought at the Battle of Prestonpans in 1745. Married firstly Margaret, daughter of Colin Mackenzie of Hilton from whom his successor. Married secondly Helen, daughter of John Gordon of Glenbucket.
Alexander, 3rd of Titular, Lord MacDonald, 13th chief. (Alasdair Ruadh Mac Dòmhnuill)	1754–1761	Succeeded by his nephew.
Duncan, 4th of Titular, Lord MacDonald, 14th chief. (Donnchadh Mac Aonghais)	1761–1788	Succeeded his uncle. Married Marjory, daughter of Sir Ludovick Grant of Dalvey. 3rd son was General Sir James MacDonell; CB, KCH, KCB, GCB (1778–1857).
Alexander Ranaldson, 5th of Titular, Lord MacDonald, 15th chief. (Alasdair Fiadhaich)	1788–1828	Married Rebecca, daughter of Sir William Forbes of Pitsligo.
Aneas Ranaldson, 6th of Titular, Lord MacDonald, 16th chief. (Aonghas Mac Raghnuill)	1828–1851	Married a daughter of Rt. Rev William Beneet.
Alexander Ranaldson, 7th of Titular, Lord MacDonald, 17th chief. (Alasdair Mac Raghnuill)	1851–1862	Died and buried in Dunedin, New Zealand. Succeeded by his younger brother.
Charles Ranaldson, 8th of Titular, Lord MacDonald, 18th chief. (Tearlach Mac Raghnuill)	1862–1868	Married Agnes Campbell.
Aneas Ranald, 9th of Titular, Lord MacDonald, 19th chief. (Aonghas Raghnall)	d. 1868	Succeeded "posthumously". Married Juian Charlotte, daughter of Archdeacon Wade of Bombay.
Aneas Ranald Wesdrop, 10th of Titular, 20th chief. (Aonghas Raghnall Westdrop)	1868–1901	Married Cathrine, daughter of Henry Herris Creed.
Aneas Ranald, 11th of Titular, 21st chief. (Aonghas Raghnall)	1901–1941	Married Dorah Edith, daughter of Dr H.W Hartford.
Aneas Ranald Donald, 12th of Titular, 22nd chief. (Aonghas Raghnall Dòmhnall)	1941–1999	
Aeneas Ranald Euan MacDonell, 13th of Titular, 23rd chief.	1999–2021	Succeeded by his brother.
(Colin) Patrick MacDonell, 14th of Titular, 24th chief.	2021-	
