= Lord MacDonell =

- Blazon: Or, an eagle displayed Gules surmounted of a lymphad Sable, her sails furled up and rigging proper, in the dexter chief point a dexter hand couped in fess of the Second and in the sinister a cross crosslet fitchee of the Third
- Creation date: 9 December 1716
- Created by: James VIII & III
- Peerage: Peerage of Scotland (Jacobite peerage)
- First holder: Alastair Dubh MacDonell
- Present holder: Colin Patrick MacDonell, 13th Lord MacDonell
- Heir apparent: Angus Curt MacDonell, Younger of Glengarry
- Seat: Invergarry Castle (historically)
- Former seat: Strome Castle
- Motto: Creag an Fhitich (The Raven's Rock)

Lord MacDonell refers to the Lordship of MacDonell in the Jacobite Peerage. On 9 December 1716, Alastair MacDonell of Glengarry, with remainder to his heirs male, was created by James VIII & III a Lord and Peer of Parliament as Lord Macdonell. The current holder of the title is Colin Patrick MacDonell, 13th Lord MacDonell, 24th titular chief of MacDonell of Glengarry.

== Lords ==
- Alastair MacDonell, or MacDonald, 11th Chief of Glengarry, 1st Lord MacDonell, attainted 1690, fought at Sherriffmuir, again attainted 1716, died 1724.
- John MacDonell, 2nd Lord MacDonell, 12th Chief of Glengarry, son of 1st Lord, died 1754.
- Alastair MacDonell, 3rd Lord MacDonell, 13th Chief of Glengarry, son of 2nd Lord, died 1761.
- Duncan MacDonell, 4th Lord MacDonell, 14th Chief of Glengarry, son of 3rd Lord, died 11 July 1788.
- Alexander Ranaldson MacDonell, 5th Lord MacDonell, 15th Chief of Glengarry, son of 4th Lord, born 15 September 1771, died 17 January 1828.
- Aeneas Ranaldson MacDonell, 6th Lord MacDonell, 16th Chief of Glengarry, son of 5th Lord, born 29 July 1808, died 19 June 1852.
- Alexander Ranaldson MacDonell, 7th Lord MacDonell, 17th Chief of Glengarry, elder son of 6th Lord, born 1834, died 2 June 1862.
- Charles Ranaldson MacDonell, 8th Lord MacDonell, 18th Chief of Glengarry, 3rd son of 6th Lord, born 1838, died June 1868.
- Aeneas Ranald MacDonell, 9th Lord MacDonell, a descendant of the next younger brother of the 1st Lord, and a member of the Madras Civil Service, born 1790, died October 1868.
- Aeneas Ranald Westrop MacDonell, 10th Lord MacDonell, grandson of 9th Lord, born in India 5 December 1847, died in London 2 January 1901.
- Aeneas Ranald MacDonell, 11th Lord MacDonell, CBE, born Sevenoaks, Kent, 8 August 1875, emigrated to Ceylon, died 1941.
- Air Commodore Aeneas Ranald Donald MacDonell CB DFC RAF, 12th Lord MacDonell, born Baku, Russian Empire, 15 November 1913, died 1 June 1999.
- Aeneas Ranald Euan MacDonell, 13th Lord MacDonell, born 11 November 1941, educated at Bryanston and St John's College, Cambridge, Director of London & Scandinavian Metallurgical Co. Limited.
