= Loch Màma =

Coordinates: 56.90304°N 5.68982°W

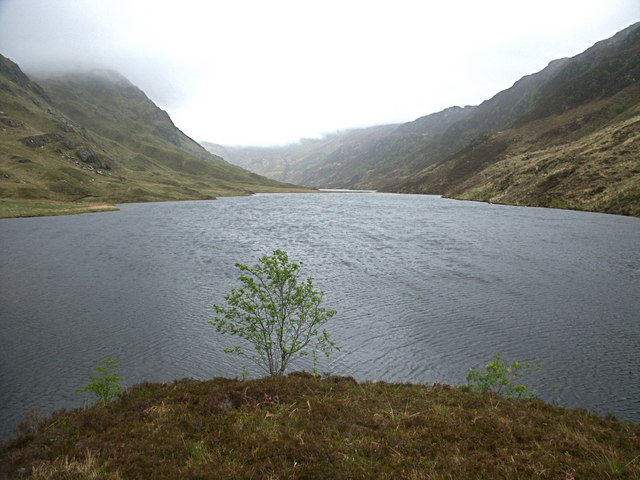
- Loch Màma from the far western shore

- Location within Highland
- Location: Morar, Lochaber, Scotland
- Type: freshwater loch
- Primary inflows: Loch na Creige Duibhe
- Primary outflows: Gleann Màma
- Basin countries: Scotland
- Max. length: 0.33 mi (0.53 km)
- Max. width: 0.125 mi (0.201 km)
- Surface area: 17 acres (0.069 km^{2})
- Average depth: 14.25 ft (4.34 m)
- Max. depth: 44 ft (13 m)
- Water volume: 11,000,000 ft^{3} (310,000 m^{3})
- Surface elevation: 359 ft (109 m)

Loch Màma is a small freshwater loch in South Morar, Lochaber, in the north west of Scotland. It forms a simple basin and is orientated east to west. It is thought that the adjoining loch Loch na Creige Duibhe and Loch Màma were at one time a single loch. Debris brought down by the Allt Dearg stream has likely caused the lochs to be separated into two bodies of water. The loch is the source of the river Allt a' Mhama.

The loch was surveyed on 11 July 1902 by James Parsons and T.R.H. Garrett and later charted as part of the Sir John Murray and Laurence Pullar's Bathymetrical Survey of Fresh-Water Lochs of Scotland 1897-1909.

== See also ==
- List of lochs in Scotland
