= Ranald MacDonell =

British diplomat (1875–1941)

Aeneas Ranald MacDonell, CBE, 11th Lord MacDonell, 21st Chief of Glengarry, (8 August 1875 – 10 May 1941) was a British diplomat.

Ranald was born in Chelsea. His father worked for the New Zealand Midland Railway Company. He attended St Paul's School, London but showed little academic promise.

In December 1917 he was given the rank of Major and attached to the British military mission in Tiflis. In the chaos of the time he took a 36-hour train journey there from Baku.

He died in Swanage in 1941.

== Publications ==
- And Nothing Long, Constable & Co Ltd, 1938, OCLC 220258993, OL 25434352M
