= Loch na Creige Duibhe (Lochaber) =

Freshwater lake in Scotland

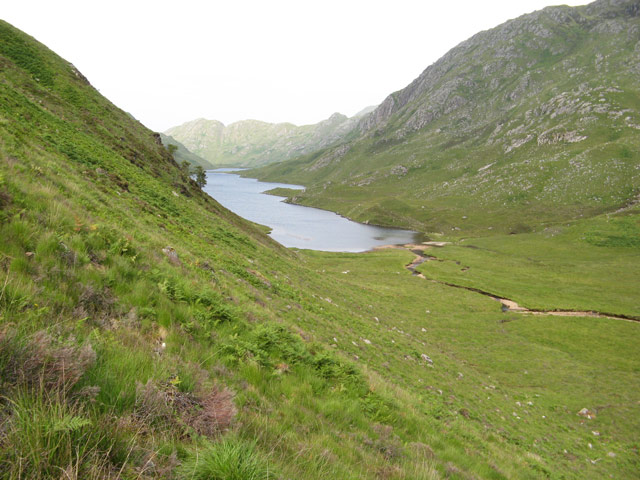
- Head of Loch na Creige Duibhe

- Location within Highland
- Location: Morar, Lochaber, Scotland
- Coordinates: 56.90283°N 5.67452°W
- Type: freshwater loch
- Primary inflows: Loch na Creige Duibhe
- Primary outflows: Loch Màma
- Basin countries: Scotland
- Max. length: 0.8 mi (1.3 km)
- Max. width: 0.12 mi (0.19 km)
- Surface area: 36.25 acres (0.1467 km^{2})
- Average depth: 42.5 ft (13.0 m)
- Max. depth: 93 ft (28 m)
- Water volume: 52,000,000 ft^{3} (1,500,000 m^{3})
- Surface elevation: 359.7 ft (109.6 m)

Loch na Creige Duibhe is a small freshwater loch in South Morar, Lochaber, in the West Highlands of Scotland. It is orientated east to west and drains into Loch Màma to the west. It is thought that Loch Màma and Loch na Creige Duibhe were at one time a single loch. Debris brought down by the Allt Dearg stream has likely caused the lochs to be separated into two bodies of water.

The loch was surveyed on 11 July 1902 by James Parsons and T.R.H. Garrett and later charted as part of Sir John Murray and Laurence Pullar's Bathymetrical Survey of Fresh-Water Lochs of Scotland 1897-1909.

== See also ==
- List of lochs in Scotland
