= Morar, Moidart and Ardnamurchan National Scenic Area =

National scenic area in Scotland

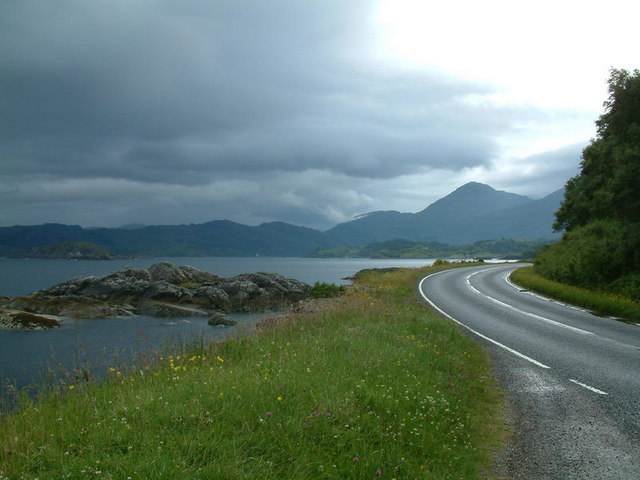
- Glenuig Bay.

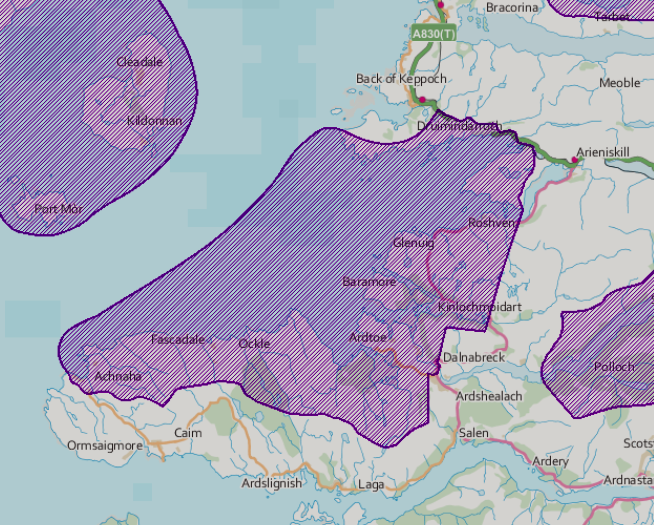
- Location and extent of the Morar, Moidart and Ardnamurchan NSA.
- Location: Highland, Scotland
- Coordinates: 56.78°N 05.75°W
- Area: 369.6 km^{2} (142.7 sq mi)
- Established: 1981
- Governing body: NatureScot

Morar, Moidart and Ardnamurchan is a national scenic area (NSA) covering the coastal scenery of three peninsulas in the western Highlands of Scotland: Ardnamurchan, Moidart and Morar. It is one of 40 such areas in Scotland, which are defined so as to identify areas of exceptional scenery and to ensure its protection from inappropriate development by restricting certain forms of development. The Morar, Moidart and Ardnamurchan NSA covers 36,956 ha in total, consisting of 17,220 ha of land with a further 19,736 ha being marine (i.e. below low tide).

National scenic areas are primarily designated due to the scenic qualities of an area, however NSAs may well have other special qualities, for example related to culture, history, archaeology, geology or wildlife. Areas with such qualities may be protected via other national and international designations that overlap with the NSA designation. Morar, Moidart and Ardnamurchan includes several Natura 2000 sites within the designated area of the NSA.

== Creation of the national scenic area ==
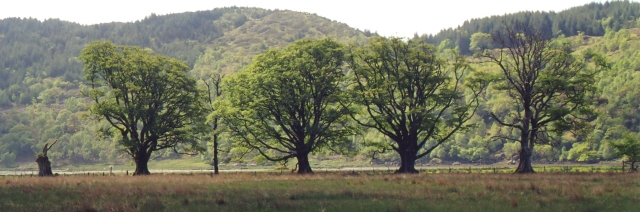
The Seven Men of Moidart

Following the Second World War, a committee, chaired by Sir Douglas Ramsay, was established to consider preservation of the landscape in Scotland. The report, published in 1945 proposed that five areas (Loch Lomond and the Trossachs, the Cairngorms, Glen Coe-Ben Nevis-Black Mount, Wester Ross and Glen Strathfarrar-Glen Affric-Glen Cannich) should receive a level of protection. Accordingly, the government designated these areas as "national park direction areas", giving powers for planning decisions taken by local authorities to be reviewed by central government. Following a further review of landscape protection in 1978, additional areas, including the western parts of the Lochaber district, were identified as worthy of protection due to their landscape qualities. Accordingly, in 1981 the direction areas were replaced by the national scenic area designation, which were based on the 1978 recommendations and thus included the area entitled Morar, Moidart and Ardnamurchan. The defined area remains as originally mapped in 1978, but was redesignated under new legislation in 2010.

Although the national scenic area designation provides a degree of additional protection via the planning process, there are no bodies equivalent to a national park authority, and whilst local authorities (in this case Highland Council) can produce a management strategy for each one, only the three national scenic areas within Dumfries and Galloway have current management strategies.

== Landscape and scenery ==
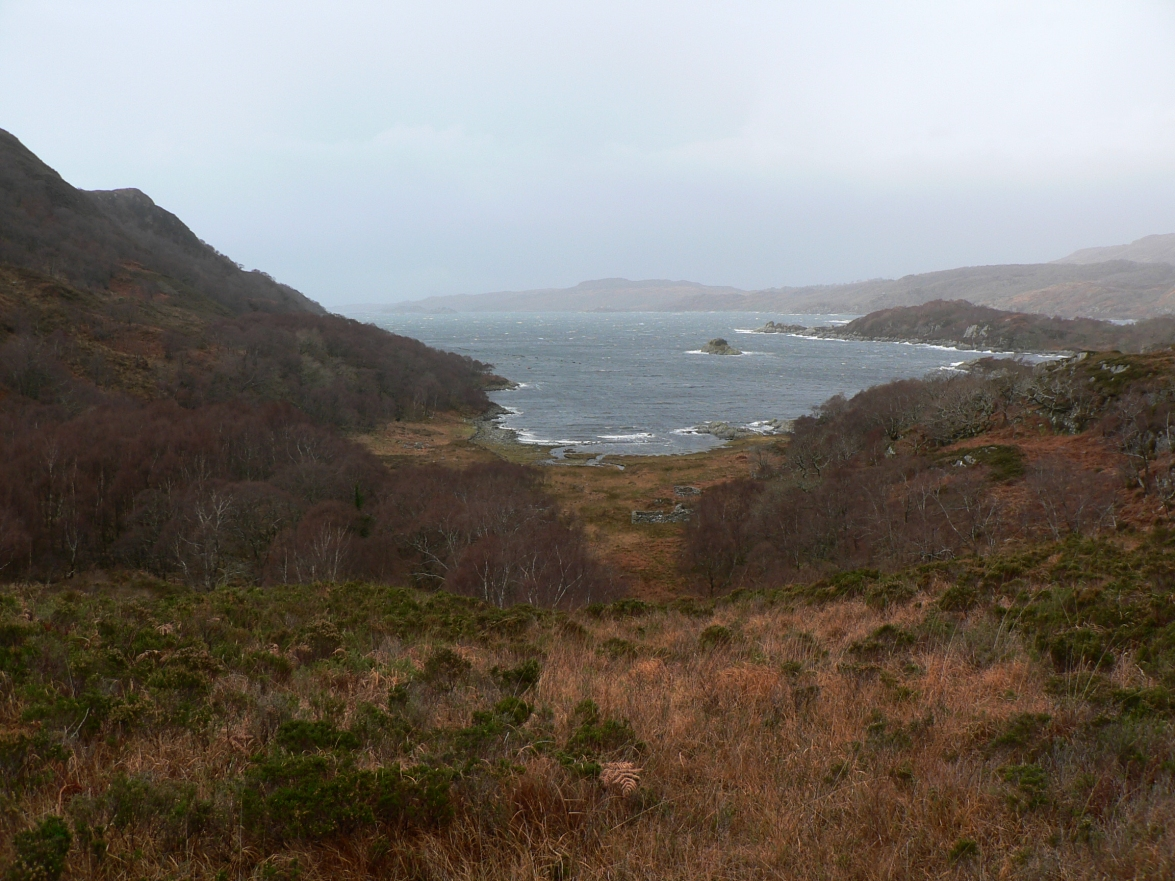
Loch nan Uamh from below Polnish.

The original 1978 report that led to the area being designated as a national scenic area noted:

The area exhibits a coastal landscape of great diversity and interest, in places enhanced by the mountain background, although it is the coastal fringe that is considered to be outstanding. This coastal fringe is made up of four main subsidiary areas each with a character of its own, but complementing the others and all linked together by views of the enhancing offshore islands of the Small Isles.

— Scottish Natural Heritage (1978)

Much of the area, including the Arisaig and Ardnish peninsulas, as well as much of the coastline and the mountainous interior, cannot be accessed by road. Additionally, the north coast of Ardnamurchan can only be reached by single track dead-end roads. The area has strong historical links with the Jacobite rising of 1745, with Loch nan Uamh being the place where Charles Edward Stuart first landed in Scotland: the row of beech trees known as the Seven Men of Moidart commemorates the rising. The picturesque ruins of Castle Tioram also add to the scenic beauty of the area.

== Conservations designations ==
A small area of the NSA is included within the Moidart and Ardgour Special Protection Area, an area is protected under the Natura 2000 programme due to its importance for breeding golden eagles.

There are six Special Areas of Conservation (SAC), within or overlapping with the NSA:

- The Ardnamurchan Burns SAC protects several burns on the Ardnamurchan peninsula that host colonies of freshwater pearl mussels.
- the Loch Moidart and Loch Shiel Woods SAC covers several areas of woodland (including acidic oak woodland) and mudflats, and host a population of otters.
- The Sound of Arisaig SAC covers an area of subtidal sandbanks.
- Kentra Moss, together with Claish Moss (outwith the NSA), form the Claish Moss and Kentra Moss SAC, which represents an important area of blanket bog. Kentra Moss is a very unusual raised bog, that is rich in Sphagnum moss species. The area is also notable for representing the transition from bog to saltmarsh.
- Glen Beasdale SAC lies at the northern end of the NSA and is protected due to the presence of freshwater pearl mussels, otters and acidic oak woodland.
- The outer sea areas of the NSA are protected as the Inner Hebrides and the Minches SAC due to their importance for harbour porpoises.

The grounds of Arisaig House, Kinlochmoidart and Eilean Shona are all listed in the Inventory of Gardens and Designed Landscapes in Scotland.
