= Alastair Dubh MacDonell =

Alastair Dubh MacDonell, 11th of Glengarry (died 28 October 1721) was a Scottish Jacobite soldier and Chief of Clan MacDonell of Glengarry.

== Biography ==
MacDonell was the son of Ranald Macdonell, 10th of Glengarry and Flora MacLeod. He joined the Jacobite rising of 1689 and fought at the Battle of Killiecrankie, when he carried the Royal Standard. He was attainted by the government of William III but managed to retain possession of his estates. MacDonell participated in the Jacobite rising of 1715. He led his clan in the Battle of Sheriffmuir, when he rallied the Jacobite right wing after the death of Alan of Clan Donald by throwing up his blue bonnet and crying Buillean an-diugh, tuiream a-màireach! ("Blows today, mourning tomorrow!"). MacDonell was again attainted in 1716. On 9 December 1716, the exiled James Francis Edward Stuart created him Lord MacDonell in the Jacobite peerage of Scotland.

MacDonell married twice. He married firstly Hon. Anne Fraser, the daughter of Hugh Fraser, 8th Lord Lovat. He married secondly Lady Mary, daughter of Kenneth Mackenzie, 3rd Earl of Seaforth.

Peerage of Scotland
New creation	— TITULAR — Lord MacDonell; Jacobite peerage 1716–1721	Succeeded by John MacDonell
