= Battle of Morar =

1602 battle in Scotland

Coordinates: 56°58′N 5°49′W

- Part of the Scottish clan wars
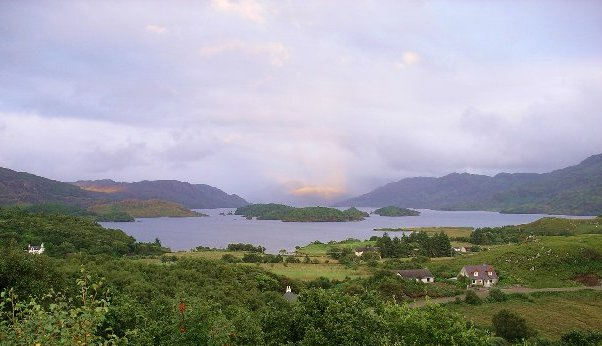
- Morar and Loch Morar
| Date | 1602 |
| Location | Morar, near Mallaig, Scotland grid reference NM6792 |
| Result | Tactical draw Strategic Mackenzie victory |

Belligerents
| Clan Mackenzie; Clan Ross | Clan MacDonell of Glengarry |

Commanders and leaders
| Kenneth Mackenzie of Kintail; Alexander Ross of Invercharron; Andrew Munro of Novar | Glengarry MacDonald |

Strength
| Clan Mackenzie: 1,700; Clan Ross: 180 | Unknown |

Casualties and losses
| 2 killed A "few" wounded | Unknown |

The Battle of Morar was a Scottish clan battle fought in 1602, near Loch Morar, in the Scottish Highlands. It was fought between the Clan MacDonell of Glengarry against the Clan Mackenzie who were supported by men of the Clan Ross and Andrew Munro of Novar.

== Background ==
A feud took place between the Mackenzies, led by Kenneth Mackenzie, 1st Lord Mackenzie of Kintail, and the Clan MacDonell of Glengarry. The Mackenzies wanted the MacDonell Laird of Glengarry to appear before the Justice court at Edinburgh for previous crimes against them. Meanwhile, two MacDonells were killed. Glengarry MacDonell did not appear in court on the arranged date but went about his own hand to revenge the slaughter of his clansmen. As he did not appear in court the Mackenzies wasted the MacDonell country of Morar.

== Battle ==
The two sides met and a battle took place with (according to some accounts) great slaughter on both sides. According to historian Alexander Mackenzie the Clan Mackenzie were supported by the Clan Ross at the battle of Morar. This was due to Kenneth Mackenzie, 1st Lord Mackenzie of Kintail, being married to Ann Ross daughter of George Ross of Balnagowan, chief of Clan Ross. After this they came to an agreement to obtain peace where Glengarry MacDonell was glad to requite and renounce to the Lord MacKenzie of Kintail, and give him the inheritance of the lands of Strome.

== Aftermath ==
After the battle, Strome Castle was still in the hands of the Clan MacDonell of Glengarry. Mackenzie of Kintail therefore laid siege to it. During the siege on Mackenzie's side Andrew Munro of Novar was wounded along with two or three others. The MacDonells surrendered and Mackenzie blew up the castle with gunpowder.
