= Morar =

Coordinates: 56.969457°N 5.82157°W

Morar: Scottish Gaelic: Mòrar
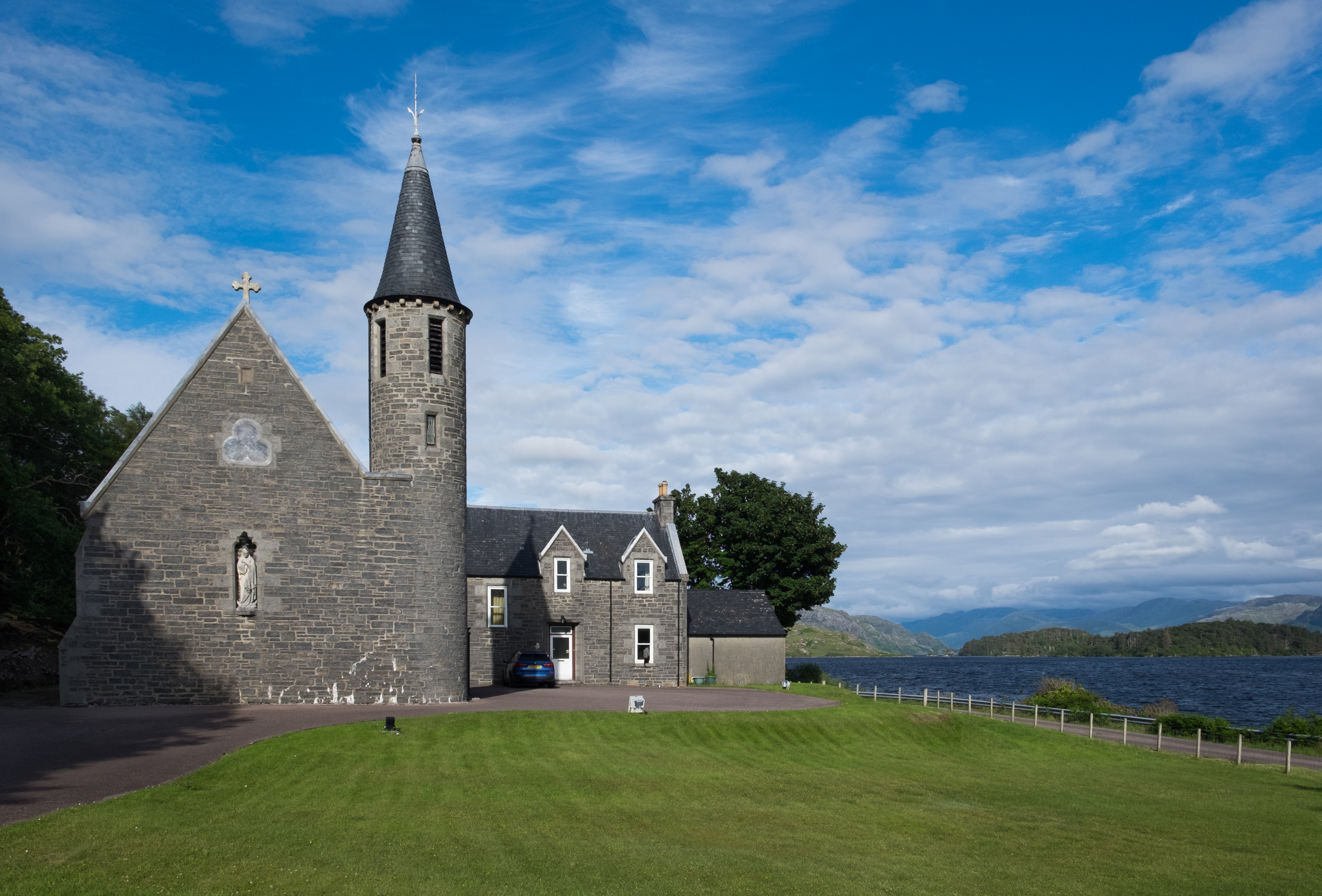
- Our Lady of Perpetual Succour & St Cumin, Morar

- Location within the Lochaber area
- Population: 257
- OS grid reference: NM677929
  - London: 532 mi (856 km)
- Council area: Highland
- Country: Scotland
- Sovereign state: United Kingdom
- Post town: Mallaig
- Postcode district: PH40
- Dialling code: 01687 462
- Police: Scotland
- Fire: Scottish
- Ambulance: Scottish

Morar (/ˈmɔːrər/; Scottish Gaelic: Mòrar) is a small village on the west coast of The Rough Bounds of Scotland, three miles (five kilometres) south of Mallaig. The name Morar is also applied to the northern part of the peninsula containing the village, though North Morar is more usual (the region to the south west of Loch Morar is known as Arisaig, rather than South Morar). The coastline of the area forms part of the Morar, Moidart and Ardnamurchan National Scenic Area, one of 40 such areas in Scotland, which are defined so as to identify areas of exceptional scenery and to ensure its protection by restricting certain forms of development.

The village was formed of the farms and crofts of Bourblach, Beoraid Beg and Beoraid Mor with the modern village growing up around the railway station of Morar during the 20th century. The 1911 census suggests that the village name was not yet in regular use at the time, as only the old settlement names are used in it.

== History ==
=== Early history ===
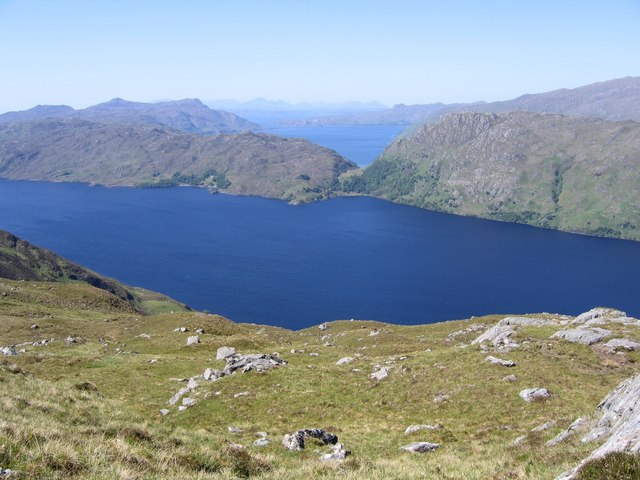
Loch Morar, and North Morar, with Loch Nevis in the distance, and Knoydart and Skye beyond that

Following raids by Vikings, the district of Morar became part of the Kingdom of the Isles, a Norwegian dependency. In practice though, by the mid 12th century, the kingdom was divided; the portion containing Morar was known as Garmoran, and ruled by the MacRory. Following the 1266 Treaty of Perth, Garmoran became a Scottish crown dependency - the Lordship of Garmoran - still ruled by the MacRory, until the sole MacRory heir was Amy of Garmoran.

Most of the remainder of the Kingdom of the Isles had become the Lordship of the Isles, ruled by the MacDonalds, whose leader, John of Islay, married Amy. After the birth of three sons, he divorced Amy and married the king's niece, in return for a substantial dowry. As part of the arrangement, John deprived his eldest son, Ranald, of the ability to inherit the Lordship of the Isles, in favour of a son by his new wife; as compensation, he made Ranald the Lord of Garmoran.

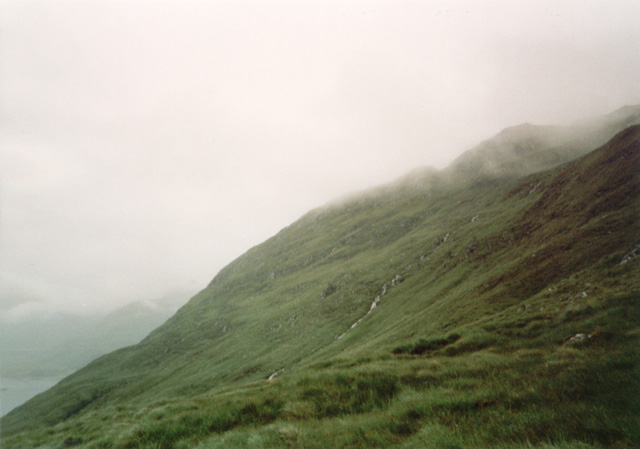
The northern slopes of Morar

However, at the end of the 14th century, on Ranald's death, his sons were still children, and Ranald's younger brother Godfrey took the opportunity to seize the Lordship of Garmoran. Furthermore, the heirs of Ranald's other brother Murdoch now made their own claim. This led to a great deal of violent conflict involving Godfrey's family (the Siol Gorrie) and those of his brothers (which is not described in surviving records in much detail).

In 1427, frustrated with the level of violence generally in the highlands, together with the insurrection caused by his own cousin, King James I demanded that highland magnates should attend a meeting at Inverness. On arrival, many of the leaders were seized and imprisoned. Alexander MacGorrie, son of Godfrey, was considered to be one of the two most reprehensible, and after a quick showtrial, was immediately executed. As Alexander had by now inherited Godfrey's de facto position as Lord of Garmoran, and in view of Ranald's heirs being no less responsible for the violence, King James declared the Lordship forfeit.

=== Lairdship grants ===
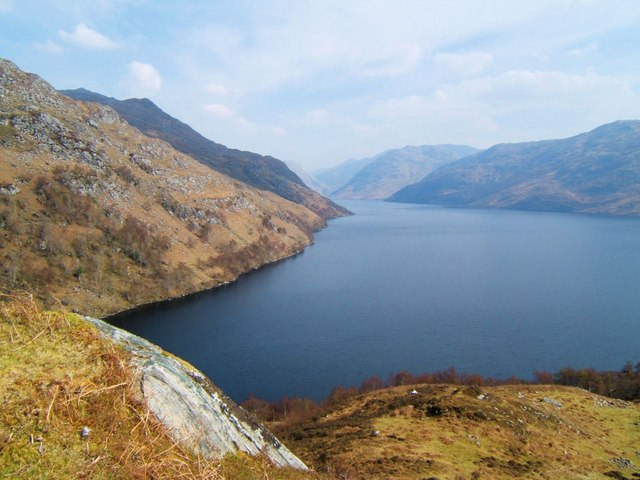
Loch Morar

In 1469, James' grandson (James III) granted Lairdship of the lands of Garmoran and Uist to John, the Lord of the Isles. In turn, John passed it to his own half-brother, Hugh of Sleat; the grant to Hugh was confirmed by the king in a 1493 charter. The violence that led to Alexander's execution had brought the Siol Gorrie to the brink of extinction, and after Alexander's death they played no further part in Morar's history.

Ranald's heirs (Clan Ranald) disputed and fought against the charter. Following Hugh of Sleat's death, in 1498, and for reasons that are not remotely clear, his son John immediately resigned, transferring all authority to the king. In 1539 the king granted Morar to the MacDonells of Glengarry, a group who claimed descent from Ranald's son Donald.

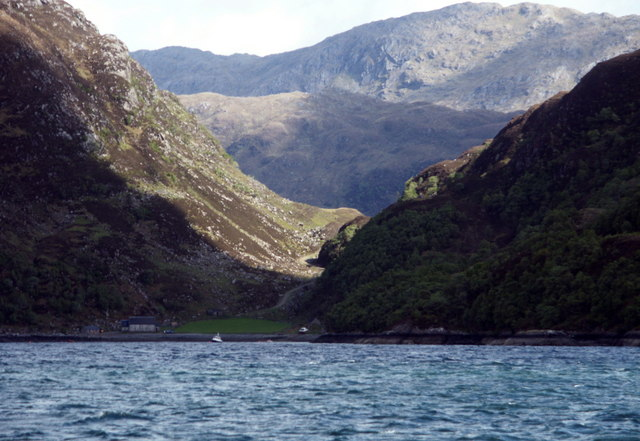
Morar from the North

Over the course of the 16th century, following an inheritance dispute over the lands of MacDonalds of Lochalsh, there were several violent encounters between the MacDonells and the MacKenzies. At the end of the century, the MacKenzies now sought to complain about MacDonell behaviour in court, but the MacDonell leadership wouldn't turn up, so in 1602, the MacKenzies laid waste to Morar as punishment. This led to the MacDonells waging battle against the MacKenzies in the Battle of Morar.

=== Later history ===
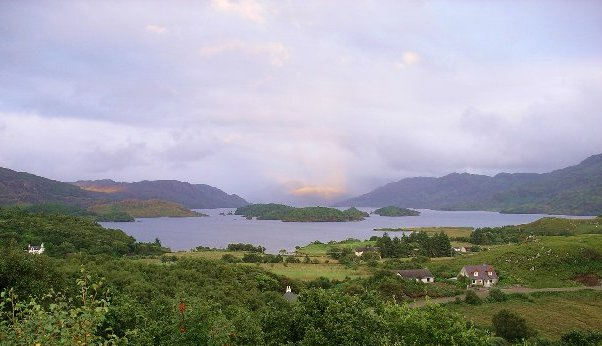
The more shallow end of Loch Morar, with islands in view.

The surrounding region is important to the history of the once strictly illegal and underground Catholic Church in Scotland. Eilean Bàn in Loch Morar was briefly the location of a clandestine Catholic seminary until the Jacobite rising of 1715 forced its closure and eventual reopening at Scalan in Glenlivet.

After the Battle of Culloden in 1746, Royal Navy crews under the command of Captain John Fergussone of HMS Furnace and Captain Duff of HMS Terror portaged overland seeking to capture local Jacobite Army veterans who were suspected of meeting together upon the island chapel in Loch Morar on 8 June 1746. Although the Jacobite leaders managed to escape the island in time, the crew of HMS Furnace continued searching in caves surrounding the Loch and eventually succeeded in capturing Lord Lovat. Bishop Hugh MacDonald, the underground Vicar General of the Highland District, remained in hiding locally until he managed to escape to France. Charles Edward Stuart, on the run, briefly passed through Morar after arriving from the Isle of Skye and Raasay before proceeding onto Borrodale Bay near Arisaig.

In early to mid July 1746, Roman Catholic priest and former Jacobite Army non-combatant military chaplain Fr. Alexander Cameron was captured by a posse of Redcoats commanded by Captain McNiel while similarly hiding near Morar and was handed over to Captain John Fergussone and held as a prisoner aboard HMS Furnace. After "he bore all kinds of insults and cruelty with unconquerable patience and Christian fortitude", Fr. Cameron died of torture and the many hardships of his imprisonment on 19 October 1746, while aboard the prison hulk HMS Furnace, which was anchored in the Thames River.

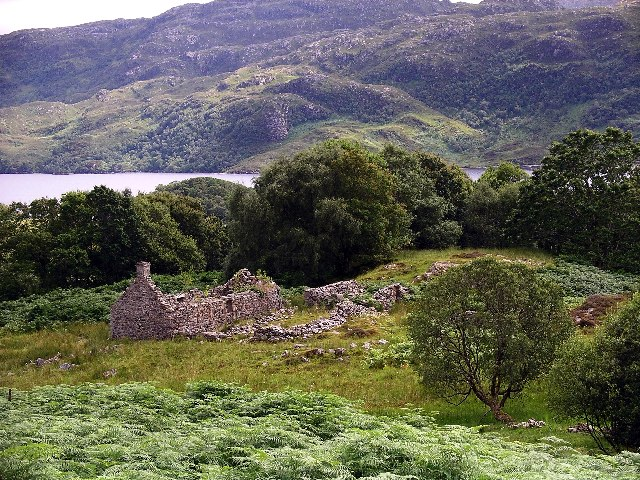
An abandoned house on Morar

During the subsequent Highland Clearances, many local residents emigrated to Canada. Boats left in 1790, 1802, and 1826, carrying local Gaels to Quebec, Glengarry County, Ontario, and the Strait of Canso in Nova Scotia respectively. In Scottish Gaelic literature and that of Canadian Gaelic, poet Anna NicGillìosa (1759-1847) emigrated from Morar in 1786 and eventually settled in Glengarry County, Ontario, and a poem in praise of her new home there survives. Following her death there, NicGillìosa was buried beside St Raphael's Church in South Glengarry.

Many houses in the area were covertly used as training schools for Special Operations Executive operatives preparing for missions behind enemy lines during World War II. The Land, Sea and Islands Centre in Arisaig has a display on the connection between SOE and the area and has published a book on the subject.

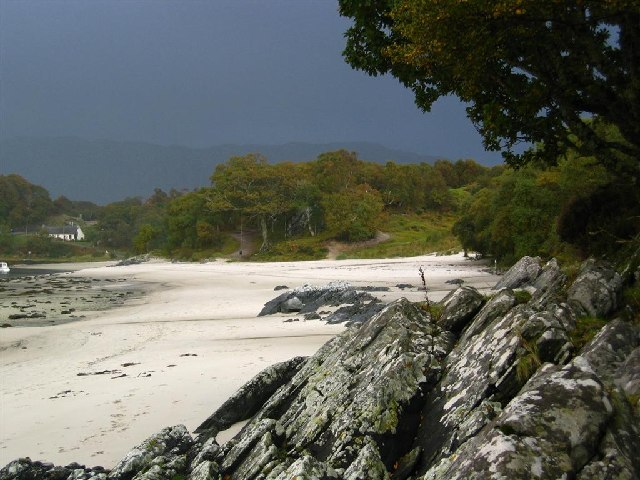
The sands at Morar

In addition to being where Fr. Alexander Cameron was captured by the redcoats in 1746, Morar Beach has also served as a location in the 1983 film Local Hero. It was also used for filming the scene in Highlander (1986), when Ramirez (Sean Connery) and Connor MacLeod (Christopher Lambert) race along the beach. In the 1995 movie, Rob Roy Morar was used to film the location for Rob Roy MacGregor's thatched blackhouse.

== Transport ==
Morar has a railway station on the West Highland Line. Morar is by-passed by the A830, part of the Road to the Isles, between Fort William and Mallaig.

== Notable people ==
- BBC weather forecaster Carol Kirkwood (b.1962), is a native of Morar.
- Morar was a favourite winter travel destination of the noted English composer, Sir Arnold Bax (1883–1953), during the 1930s. He worked on his Third Symphony and each subsequent symphony during his visits to the Station Hotel there.
- Morar was, for many years, the home of Cyril Kenneth Bird, better known as Fougasse, who was a cartoonist for Punch magazine and served as its editor for four years.

== In popular culture ==
- The area is famous for its beaches, known as the "White Sands of Morar". One, which featured prominently in the film Local Hero, as well as in Breaking the Waves, is a few miles south of the village. Nearby Loch Morar is the deepest freshwater body in the British Isles at 1,020 feet (310 m) and is linked to the sea by the short River Morar.

== See also ==
- Loch Morar
