= Clan MacDonell of Glengarry =

Highland Scottish clan

MacDonell of Glengarry
- Clann Dòmhnaill Ghlinne Garaidh
- Crest: A raven Proper perching on a rock Azure
- Motto: Creagan an Fhitich (The Rock of the Raven)
- Slogan: Per mare per terras (By sea and by land)

Profile
- Region: Highland
- District: Ross; Lochaber
- Plant badge: Common Heath
- Pipe music: Glengarry's March

Chief
- Colin Patrick MacDonell of Glengarry
- The 24th Chief of Glengarry (Mac Mhic Alasdair)
- Historic seat: Strome Castle; Invergarry Castle
Septs of MacDonell of Glengarry
Alastair, Alexander, Allister, Carroon, Chomghain, Cowan, Cunningham, Greenfield, Kennedy, MacAlasdair, MacCowan, MacGillies, MacIlchomhghain, MacInnes, MacIntyre, MacIver, MacLellan, MacPhail, MacWalrick, Sanders, Saunders, Sanderson
Clan branches
MacDonells of Glengarry (chiefs)
McDonells of Barrisdale
MacDonalles of Knoydart
MacDonells of Greenfield
MacDonells of Lundie
MacDonells of Scotus
MacDonells of Ardnabie
MacDonells of Invergarry
MacDonells of Leek
MacDonells of Lochgarry
Allied clans
Clan Cameron
Clan Stewart
Rival clans
Clan Mackenzie
Clan Fraser of Lovat
Clan Campbell
Clan Mackintosh

Clan MacDonell of Glengarry, also known as Clan Ranald of Knoydart & Glengarry (Scottish Gaelic: Clann Dòmhnaill Ghlinne Garaidh) is a Highland Scottish clan and is a branch of the larger Clan Donald. The clan takes its name from River Garry where the river Garry runs eastwards through Loch Garry to join the Great Glen about 16 miles (25 km) north of Fort William, Highland. The progenitor of the MacDonells of Glengarry is Donald, son of Reginald, 4th great-grandson of the warrior Somerled and ancestor of Clan Macdonald of Clanranald.

The MacDonells of Glengarry have historically possessed land holdings in the districts of Ross-shire and Lochaber in the Scottish Highlands. Their territories occasionally resulted in land disputes with other clans, most notably Clan Mackenzie. The clan supported the House of Stuart during the Jacobite rebellions, pledging their allegiance to the Jacobite cause. After the Jacobite Uprisings, the clan suffered during the Highland Clearances.

The clan chief is traditionally designated as the "Son of Alexander's son" (Scottish Gaelic: Mac Mhic Alasdair). Clan MacDonell of Glengarry has a chief that is recognized by the Court of the Lord Lyon, and the Lord Lyon King of Arms, who is the heraldic authority in Scotland.

== History of the MacDonells of Glengarry ==
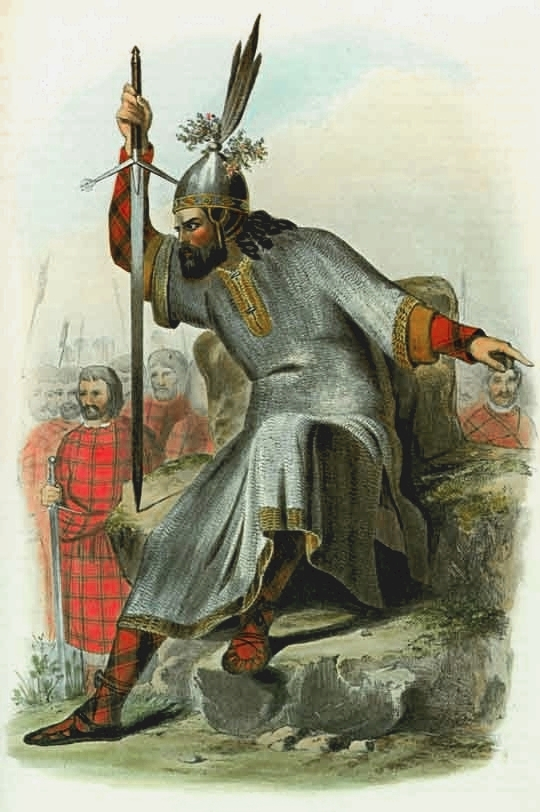
R.R. McIan's Victorian era romanticised depiction of a Macdonald, lord of the Isles.

=== Origins ===
The MacDonells of Glengarry are one of the branch clans of Clan Donald—one of the largest Scottish clans. The eponymous ancestor of Clan Donald is Donald, son of Reginald, son of Somerled. Somerled, son of Gillebride was a 12th-century leader, styled as "King of the Isles" and "King of Argyll". Through ambitious military conquest, Somerled rose in prominence to create the Kingdom of Mann and the Isles. However, his origins and ancestry are obscure. King Robert the Bruce granted a charter of many lands to Aonghus Óg of Islay, including half the Lordship of Lochaber. Angus Og's son John was the first Lord of the Isles. John's first marriage was to Amie MacRuari, heiress of Clann Ruaidhrí. John later divorced Amie and married Margaret, daughter of King Robert II. The children from John's first marriage became the main succession of the chiefship of Clan Donald and the later Macdonald Lords of the Isles would go on to descend from John's second marriage. The MacDonells of Glengarry and MacDonalds of Clanranald both descend from John and Amie's eldest son, Reginald.

=== 14th century ===
Reginald, 1st of Clanranald and Glengarry, inherited most of the former lands of Clann Ruaidhrí through his mother, Amie MacRuari. He married Lady Fiona Stewart, daughter of Walter Stewart, Earl of Atholl, and had five sons, including Alan, progenitor of Clan MacDonald of Clanranald, and Donald, 2nd of Glengarry. Little is known of Donald’s life. During his time, the lands of Glengarry were temporarily taken into Crown control but were later secured by the clan through a royal charter, restoring legal ownership despite earlier forfeiture by their feudal superior, Godfrey of Garmoran. Donald married twice: first to Laleve, daughter of the chief of Clan MacIver, with whom he had a son, John; and secondly to a daughter of the chief of Clan Fraser of Lovat, with whom he had two sons, Alexander and Angus. Donald died in Lochaber in 1420 and was buried at Rollaig Orain. He was succeeded by his son.

The first son, John 3rd of Glengarry, died without heirs and was therefore succeeded by his half-brother Alexander "of the Woods", 4th chief of Glengarry, progenitor of Glengarry. Alexander is sometimes considered the first true chief of Glengarry but is usually regarded as the fourth of Glengarry. From Alexander, the clan takes the Gaelic patronymic of Mac Mhic Alasdair, meaning "son of the son of Alexander".

=== 15th century ===
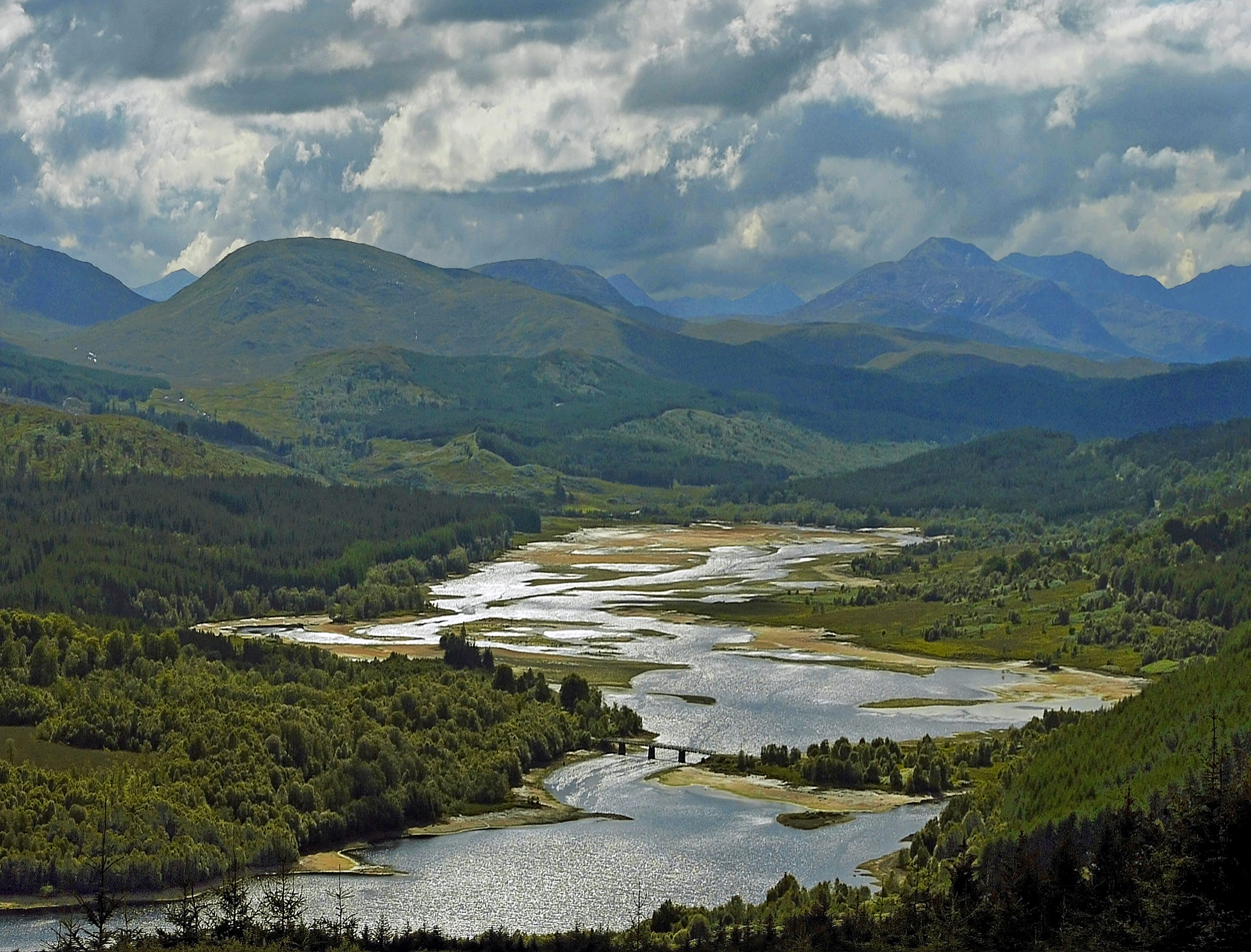
The MacDonells of Glengarry resided in the glens near Loch Garry.

According to Angus and Archibald MacDonald, the MacVuirich family seanachie recorded the death of Alexander “of the Woods,” described as a powerful warlike lord of Clanranald, who died on the Isle of Abbas in 1460. Contemporary Crown records, however, make no reference to his territorial holdings. He was succeeded by his son, John MacAlister Ranaldson, 5th of Glengarry, who inherited the lands of Glengarry. During this period, the clan formed part of the MacDonalds of Clanranald and supported Aonghas Óg MacDonald in his claim to the Lordship of the Isles, fighting at the Battle of Bloody Bay and later at the Battle of Lagabraad against Clan Mackenzie, where Clan Donald was victorious. In 1501, John MacAlister Ranaldson was killed by Fraser of Lovat after being lured to a meeting at Achteraw in Abertarff. This led to a conflict between the MacDonells of Glengarry and the Frasers of Lovat, ending with the Frasers’ defeat and the surrender of Abertarff to Glengarry. Legal proceedings were later brought before the Lords of Council by Alexander MacIain of Glengarry against those responsible for his father’s murder.

Alexander Ranaldson, 6th of Glengarry, was considered to be a rebellious chief. The MacDonells of Glengarry did not play an important part in the politics of Clan Donald until the late 15th century. Traditional rights of the chiefs were being replaced with feudal relationships in which the Crown was the ultimate superior, as part of the royal policy to pacify the Scottish Highlands, including taking charters from lands formerly held by the Lords of the Isles. The lands of Glengarry were leased to the Earl of Huntly, and the Camerons of Lochiel. Most of the chiefs submitted to James IV of Scotland, and even the MacDonalds of Clanranald accepted charters in 1494. Alexander Ranaldson did not receive a charter, suggesting that he continued to have a rebellious attitude at this time after the fall of the Lords of the Isles. In response, James IV tasked the Earl of Huntly and the Duke of Argyll in carrying out his policy in dividing the territories that once belonged to the Lordship of the Isles for their own holdings for their own clan lands.

=== 16th century ===
In 1501, Alexander Ranaldson was summoned for occupying lands in Morar without legal title, while parts of Glengarry were granted to the Earl of Huntly’s son. He later supported the nsurrection cof Domhnall Dubh, though he did not take part directly. Further grants of Glengarry were made to Huntly in 1510. Following the death of James IV at the Battle of Flodden, Ranaldson supported Donald Gallda’s claim to the Lordship of the Isles, leading to conflicts with Clan Grant and the occupation of Urquhart Castle. After these rebellions failed, Ranaldson submitted to the Crown and was pardoned in 1531. In 1539, Ranaldson received a Crown charter confirming Glengarry, Morar, and other lands, but he continued to support efforts to restore the Lordship of the Isles, including the failed rebellion of Donald Gorm of Sleat. He was imprisoned by James V in 1542. Members of Clan MacDonell of Glengarry later supported Clan Cameron in raids of Urquhart in 1544 and 1545, prompting petitions from Clan Grant for royal protection. In response, royal letters were issued in 1567 ordering neighboring chiefs to defend Grant lands. Alexander Ranaldson also fought at the Battle of the Shirts in support of John Moidartach and the MacDonalds of Clanranald and Clan Cameron against Clan Fraser of Lovat. He died in 1560.

Angus MacAlester, 7th of Glengarry, used his father-in-law, the chief of Clan Grant, to secure a charter from James VI of Scotland, reclaiming his ancestral lands in 1574. A 1571 bond of manrent between MacAlester and Clan Grant included an exception recognizing the authority of Clanranald, implying Glengarry's acknowledgment of Clanranald as his chief.

Donald MacAngus, 8th of Glengarry, succeeded Angus, who was reputed to have lived over one hundred years. In February 1576, Donald MacAngus successfully complained to the Privy Council after Hugh Fraser, 5th Lord Lovat blocked his timber transport on Loch Ness towards Inverness, and Lord Lovat was ordered not to interfere. Known for his law-abiding nature, Donald MacAngus sought protection from the Privy Council in 1577 when Colin Campbell, 6th Earl of Argyll, upon succeeding as chief of the Campbells in 1577, invaded and plundered the lands of the MacLeans and the MacDonalds, including making preparations for an invasion of the mainland, with the lands of Glengarry as his principle attack. The Council declared Donald MacAngus a "good subject," prohibiting Argyll’s attack and rallying local clans to defend Glengarry, and forbidding any further attacks against Glengarry under pain of treason. The Earl of Argyll conceded and abandoned his plans for invasion.

=== 17th century ===
==== Bitter feuding with the Mackenzies of Kintail ====
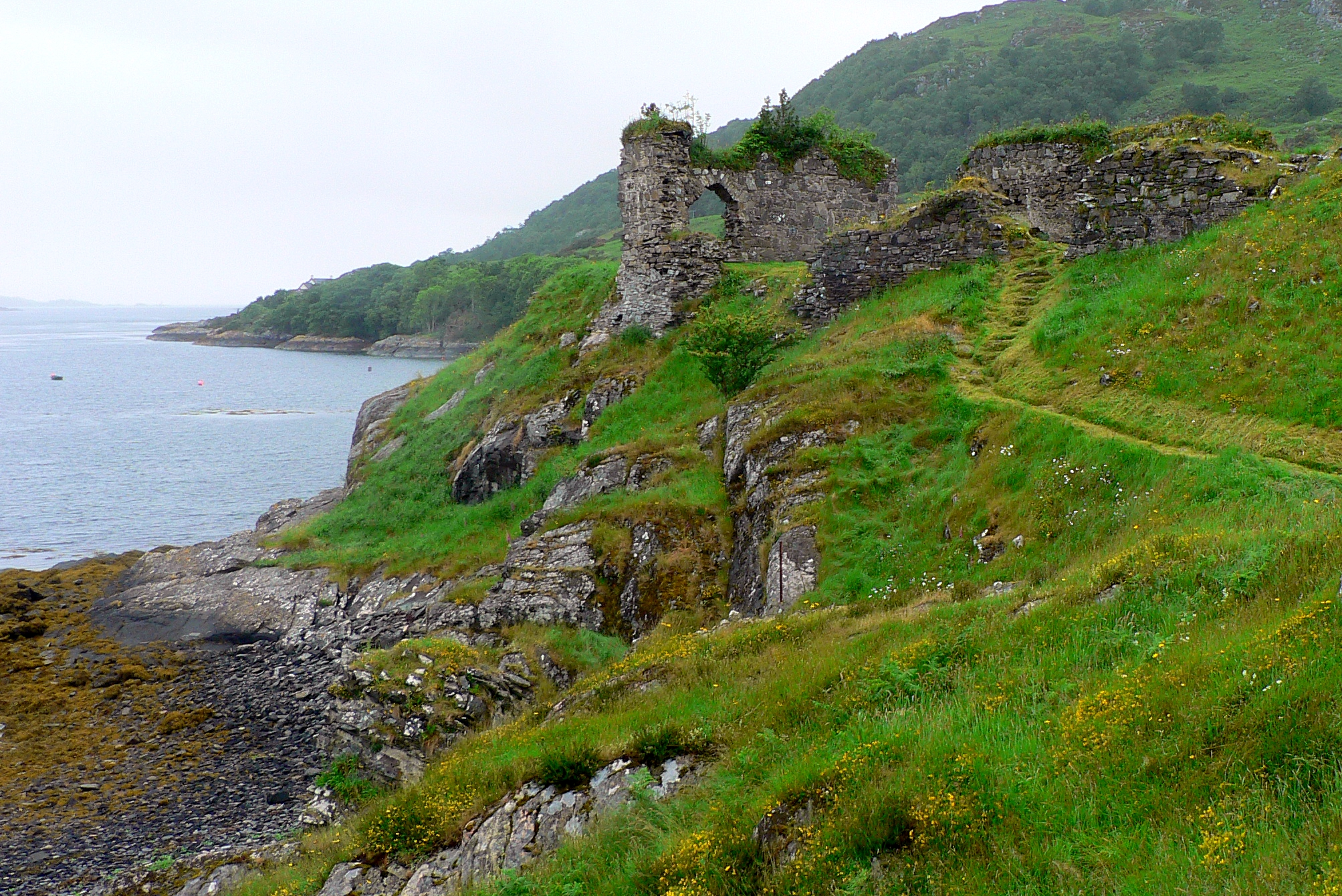
Ruins of Strome Castle, the original seat of the chiefs of the Clan MacDonell of Glengarry.

The feud with Clan Mackenzie began in the late 16th century after Angus MacAlester inherited lands in Wester Ross. The conflict escalated when two of his cousins burned a house of a murderer in Applecross, killing a Mackenzie, leading Kenneth Mackenzie, 1st Lord Mackenzie of Kintail to accuse the MacDonells of the murder to the Privy Council, prompting Angus MacAlester to flee Edinburgh. In November 1601, Angus MacDonell, son of Donald MacAngus, led a raid on Mackenzie lands in Torridon. A complaint was filed with the Privy Council, but neither Angus nor his father appeared in court. On 9 September 1602, Donald MacAngus was declared an outlaw. In response, the Council acquired Kenneth Mackenzie a commission of "fire and sword", and procured through the interest of the 1st Earl of Dunfermline by invading Glengarry's lands of Morar. Similarly, the MacDonells raided the Mackenzies and wasted the lands of Lochalsh and Applecross. The escalation came to head at the Battle of Morar, where the Mackenzies laid siege to Strome Castle, causing the MacDonells to surrender, and the Mackenzies demolished the castle by gunpowder. The clan soon built Invergarry Castle in the Great Glen. The conflict intensified when Glengarry allied with MacDonald of Moidart. While Kenneth Mackenzie sought support from Hector Og MacLean of Duart in Mull, Angus MacDonell raided Lochcarron. The MacDonells loaded their boats with plunder, but the MacKenzies intercepted the MacDonells in small rowing boats, overturning the boat, and killing many men, including Angus. The survivors swam to the Isle of Skye and escaped, leaving their pillaged plunders behind. The following year, Allan Dubh MacRanuil of Lundie launched a fiercer raid on the Mackenzies by burning an entire congregation of Mackenzie clansmen in the church in Kilchrist. According to tradition, a bagpiper for the MacDonells of Glengarry marched around the burning church playing a spirited tune, which was later known as "Cillechriost". However, the MacDonells, despite their sanguinary excesses, were no match for the politically astute Mackenzie, who succeeded in obtaining a crown charter to the disputed districts of Loch Alsh, Lochcarron and others, and who steadily bought up the claims of third parties against Glengarry in 1607. Their differences were eventually settled by an arrangement which secured absolutely to Mackenzie all Glengarry's lands in Ross-shire and the superiority of all his other possessions, but Glengarry was to hold the latter, paying Mackenzie a small feu as superior. Donald MacAngus was later compensated with Knoydart from the Camerons of Lochiel in 1611.

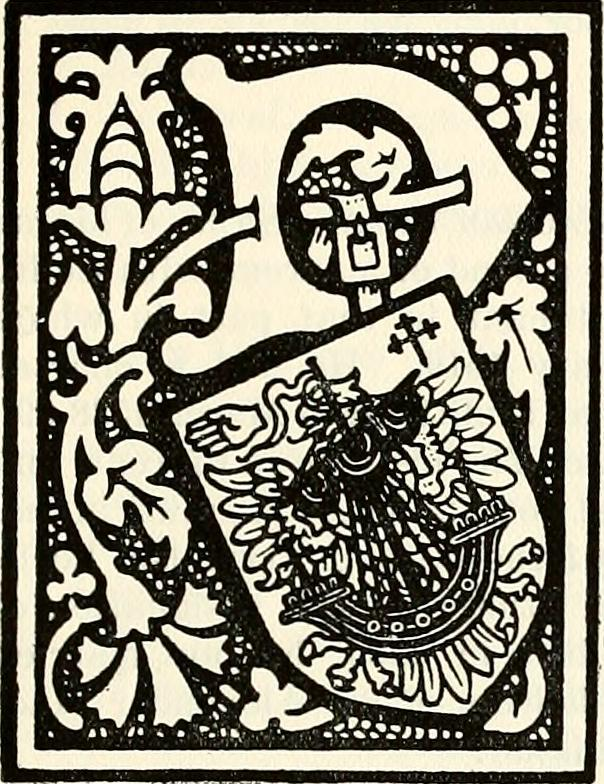
A depiction of the coats of arms for MacDonell, Lord MacDonell and Aros, published in The Scots Peerage by Sir James Balfour Paul in 1904.

==== Mid-17th century ====
Donald MacAngus was briefly imprisoned by Lord Ochiltree, Lord Chancellor of Scotland, in 1626, but secured a charter in 1627 that made Glengarry a free barony. At the outbreak of the Wars of the Three Kingdoms in 1639, he passed his duties to his son, Aeneas, 9th of Glengarry. Aeneas was a committed Royalist and fought under James Graham, 1st Marquis of Montrose during the 1644–1645 campaign, including actions following the Battle of Philiphaugh. Montrose’s forces defeated the Covenanters under the Marquess of Argyll at the Battle of Inverlochy in 1645, an event later commemorated in verse by the Keppoch bard Iain Lom.

Following Donald MacAngus’s death in 1645, Aeneas continued to support the Royalist cause, serving in Confederate Ireland in 1647 with the army of Thomas Preston, 1st Viscount Tara. His estates were confiscated during the Protectorate under Oliver Cromwell but were restored after the Restoration in 1660. Aeneas was subsequently raised to the Scottish peerage as Lord MacDonell and Aros. This title is cited as the origin of the surnames MacDonell, McDonell, and McDonnell, with spelling variations reflecting usage among different descendant families of the Glengarry branch.

==== Keppoch murders ====
On 25 September 1663, Alexander MacDonald, 12th of Keppoch, and his brother Ranald were murdered in a brawl at Insch, near Roybridge, Lochaber, by Alexander MacDonald of Inverlair and his six sons. The murders stemmed from rival claims to the chieftainship of Clan MacDonald of Keppoch. Keppoch bard Iain Lom sought revenge but initially met with apathy from Lord MacDonell. Two years later, the killers were hunted down and killed by men sent by MacDonald of Sleat. Iain Lom presented their severed heads at Invergarry Castle, an event known as the Keppoch murders.

==== Later 17th century ====
In 1665, a serious quarrel broke out between the MacDonells of Glengarry and the town of Inverness; a dispute led to an escalation resulting in several casualties. The MacDonells threatened revenge on the town due to their longstanding feud with the Mackintoshes, who were friendly with Inverness. The town sought support from neighboring Mackintoshes, while the MacDonells proposed a treaty with demanding conditions. The Privy Council ruled in favor of the MacDonells, ordering Inverness to pay Glengarry £4,800 in damages and fees, including the fees due to the surgeon who attended the wounded MacDonells.

Aeneas produced no eligible children, and the title died with him in 1680. Ranald, 2nd of Scotus, and 10th of Glengarry succeeded as chief of Glengarry in 1680. When James II & VII was expelled in the Glorious Revolution of 1688, Alastair Dubh MacDonell, acted on behalf of his father as chief and leader of the Glengarry clan during the 1689 Jacobite rising. The Scots Parliament confiscated Glengarry's lands, although the MacDonells continued to hold Invergarry Castle. The clan, along with 2500 clansmen, fought under John Graham, 1st Viscount Dundee at the Battle of Killiecrankie. During this time, the MacDonells of Glengarry, along with the MacDonalds of Glencoe began looting and raiding other neighboring clans, including the lands of Robert Campbell of Glenlyon. In his subsequent appeal for compensation, Robert Campbell of Glenlyon believed the Glengarry men to be the more culpable, making no mention of Glencoe. By late 1691, the British government was determined to "make an example" of the MacDonells. Ranald did not take the oath of allegiance to the new Williamite government until 4 February. John Dalrymple, 1st Earl of Stair's letter to Campbell of Breadalbane on 2 December showed the decision to make an example of Glengarry was taken before the deadline for the oath, originally as a much bigger operation; "...the clan Donell must be rooted out and Lochiel. Leave the McLeans to Argyll...". However, after agreeing to pardon Ranald MacDonell of his treason, the Williamites switched targets to the MacDonalds of Glencoe, which resulted in the Massacre of Glencoe.

=== 18th century ===
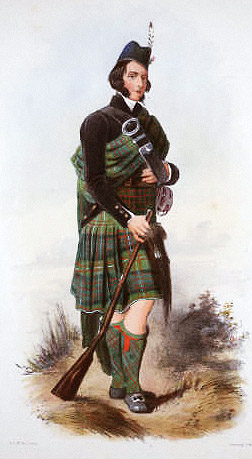
Clan tartan. Illustration by R. R. McIan from James Logan's The Clans of the Scottish Highlands, published in 1845.

Ranald died in 1705 and was succeeded by his son, Alastair Dubh MacDonell, 11th of Glengarry, who later became the titular Lord MacDonald and was regarded as "one of the most distinguished warriors of his day in the Highlands". Alastair Dubh was an early supporter of the Jacobite rising of 1715 and joined John Graham, 1st Viscount Dundee in 1689 with approximately 300 followers in Lochaber. Montrose wrote his famous letter to Clan MacLeod on 23 June 1689, in which he says "Glengaire gave me account of the subject of a letter he receaved from you; I shall only tell yow, that if you hasten not to land your men, I am of opinion you will have litle occasion to do the king great service". When Ailean Dearg, the Chief of Clan Macdonald of Clanranald was mortally wounded at the Battle of Sheriffmuir, Alasdair Dubh rallied the faltering warriors of Clan Donald by throwing up his blue bonnet and crying Buillean an-diugh, tuiream a-màireach! ("Blows today, mourning tomorrow!"); In 1716, Alastair was given the title Lord MacDonell in the Jacobite peerage. General Wade's report on the Highlands in 1724, estimated the clan strength at 800 men. Alastair Dubh died at Invergarry in 1721, and was eulogized in the song-poem Alistair à Gleanna Garadh by his kinswoman Sìleas na Ceapaich, which hearkens back to the mythological poetry attributed to Amergin Glúingel and which remains an iconic and oft imitated work of Scottish Gaelic literature. His eldest son, John, succeeded him.

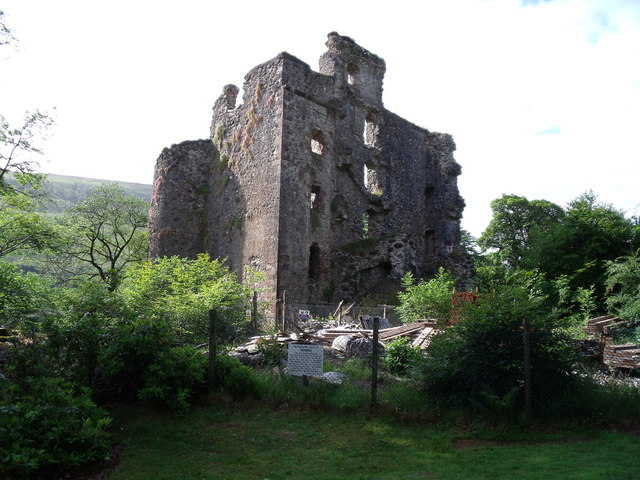
Invergarry Castle is the traditional seat of Clan MacDonell of Glengarry, and home to the chiefs of the MacDonells until 1746 when the British Government partially destroyed the castle under the orders of the Duke of Cumberland.

John, 2nd titular Lord MacDonald and 12th of Glengarry, succeeded as chief and secured a charter for Knoydart from John Campbell, 2nd Duke of Argyll in 1724. Although John did not take part in the Jacobite rising of 1745, his second son, Aeneas (also known as Angus), fought in the rebellion.

Glengarry's Regiment participated in several engagements, including the Highbridge Skirmish, the first clash between government and Jacobite forces, as well as the battles of Prestonpans and Falkirk. Aeneas was accidentally shot after the action at Falkirk and died three days later. Command of the regiment then passed to his kinsman, Donald MacDonnell of Lochgarry, who led it at the Battle of Culloden in April 1746 under James Drummond, 3rd Duke of Perth. At Culloden, the regiment numbered approximately 530 men, the largest in the Jacobite army. During the battle, the MacDonald regiments were located on the extreme left wing of the Jacobite army, instead of their preferred place on the right wing. According to legend, these regiments refused to charge when ordered to do so, due to the perceived insult of being placed on the left wing. Following the defeat, the regiment was disbanded in May 1746. Charles Edward Stuart later sought refuge at Invergarry Castle, which was subsequently destroyed by government troops. John’s eldest son, Alastair Ruadh, later 13th of Glengarry, was captured in November 1745 while travelling from France to join the rising. He was imprisoned in the Tower of London, and released in 1747. He was later identified by historian Andrew Lang as “Pickle the Spy,” a government informant within the Jacobite movement, though his motivations remain disputed.

=== 19th century to modern day ===
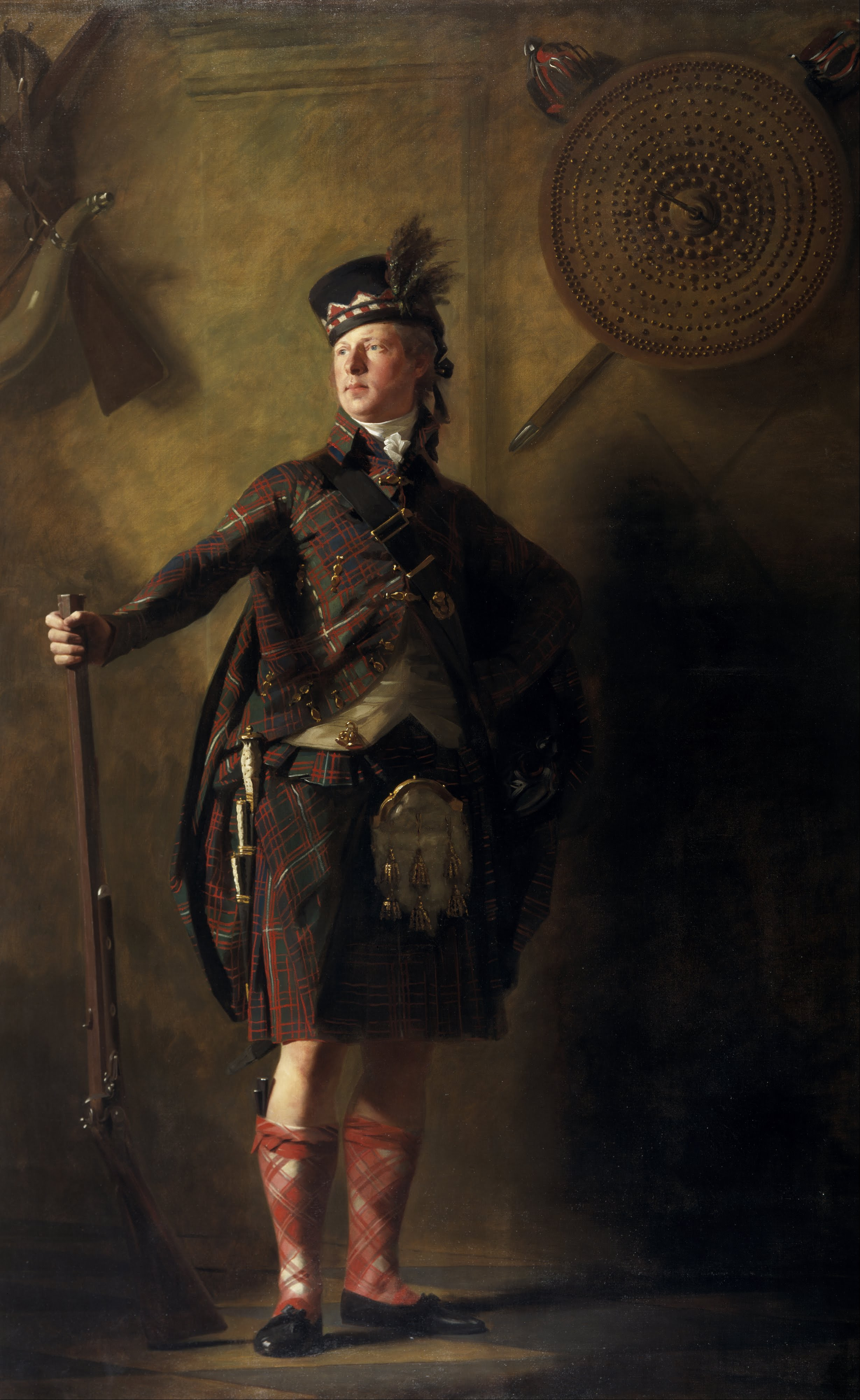
Alexander Ranaldson MacDonell of Glengarry, ca 1812.

In the early 1800s, the Highland Clearances forced most of Clan MacDonell of Glengarry to leave Scotland. Many settled in Glengarry County, Ontario, and parts of Nova Scotia. The largest evictions were ordered by the 15th chief, Alexander Ranaldson MacDonell of Glengarry, who was known for his proud and dramatic personality and is believed to have inspired a character in Walter Scott’s novel Waverley. In 1815, he founded the Society of True Highlanders, which promoted Highland identity and traditions. Events surrounding George IV's visit to Scotland in 1822 helped popularize tartans and traditional Highland dress.

A relative, His kinsman Fr. Alexander MacDonell (1762–1840), became a Catholic priest and played an important role in both military and religious life. In 1794, he helped raise the Glengarry Fencibles and became the first Catholic military chaplain in Britain since the Reformation. He later emigrated with his clansmen to Canada, helped reform the regiment during the War of 1812, and in 1826 became the first Bishop of Kingston, Ontario. Another clan member, Sir James MacDonell, fought at the Battle of Waterloo, where he was praised by the Arthur Wellesley, 1st Duke of Wellington as “the bravest man in the British Army” and shared his reward money with his sergeant, James Graham.

In 1840, the 16th chief, Aneas Ranaldson, sold the clan lands and emigrated to Australia, though he later returned to Scotland and died in 1851. His successor also emigrated, eventually settling in New Zealand. After several deaths and migrations, the main family line became extinct, but leadership continued through a distant relative, Aneas Ranald, 19th of Glengarry through the Scotus branch, thus continuing the chief succession of the clan.

During the late 19th and early 20th centuries, later chiefs were educated in England and pursued careers in business, banking, and the military. One served as a British officer during World War I. The 22nd chief died in 1999, and the 23rd chief served until his death in 2021.

The current chief is Colin Patrick MacDonell, who lives in North Vancouver, Canada. The heir apparent is Angus Curt MacDonell, known as the Younger of Glengarry.

== Castles ==
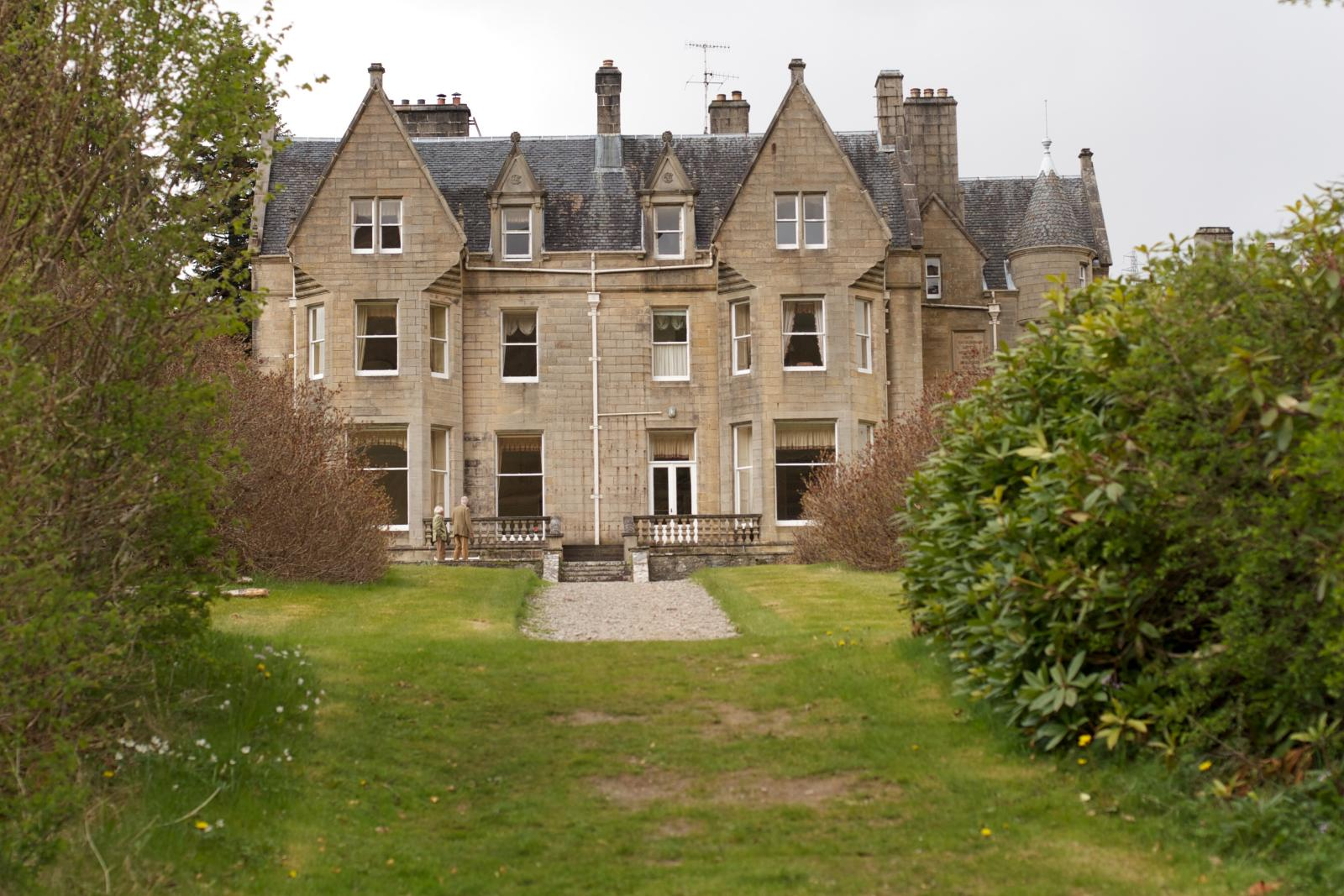
After the 1745 Jacobite Uprising, Invergarry House replaced Invergarry Castle. In 1960, Invergarry House was reborn as the Glengarry Castle Hotel. It enjoys an enviable position overlooking Loch Oich, with the added attraction of the ruins of Invergarry Castle in the grounds.

Castles that have been owned by Clan MacDonell of Glengarry include:

- Invergarry Castle was the traditional seat of Clan MacDonell of Glengarry. The castle stands overlooking Loch Oich on Cregan an Fhithich (Scottish Gaelic: The rock of the raven), which became the clan's motto. The castle was built by the MacDonells of Glengarry in 1602, shortly after clan raids committed by Clan Mackenzie. It was attacked by George Monck, 1st Duke of Albemarle during Oliver Cromwell's occupation of Scotland. In 1688, Alastair MacDonald of Glengarry temporarily fortified the castle for James II of England. It was than retaken by Alasdair Dubh of Glengarry during the Jacobite Uprising of 1715, but recaptured by the Hanoverian forces in 1716. The MacDonells retook the castle in 1731. During the Jacobite rising of 1745, Charles Edward Stuart visited the castle, but was burned by the British Government lead under Prince William, Duke of Cumberland shortly after the 1746 Jacobite rebellion failed.
- Strome Castle was the original historic castle for Clan MacDonell of Glengarry. The castle was originally built in 1472 by Alexander MacDonald, Lord of the Isles and Earl of Ross in the 15th century. Previously owned by Clan MacDonald of Lochalsh, the castle was granted by King James V of Scotland to Clan MacDonell of Glengarry in 1539. In the 17th century, Clan Mackenzie, with the support of Clan Ross, besieged the castle after the Battle of Morar in 1602, in which the MacDonells of Glengarry were defeated by the Mackenzies. According to tradition, after the MacDonells surrendered, Strome Castle was blown up with gunpowder by the Mackenzie clansmen under the leadership of Kenneth Mackenzie, 1st Lord Mackenzie of Kintail.

== Clan profile ==
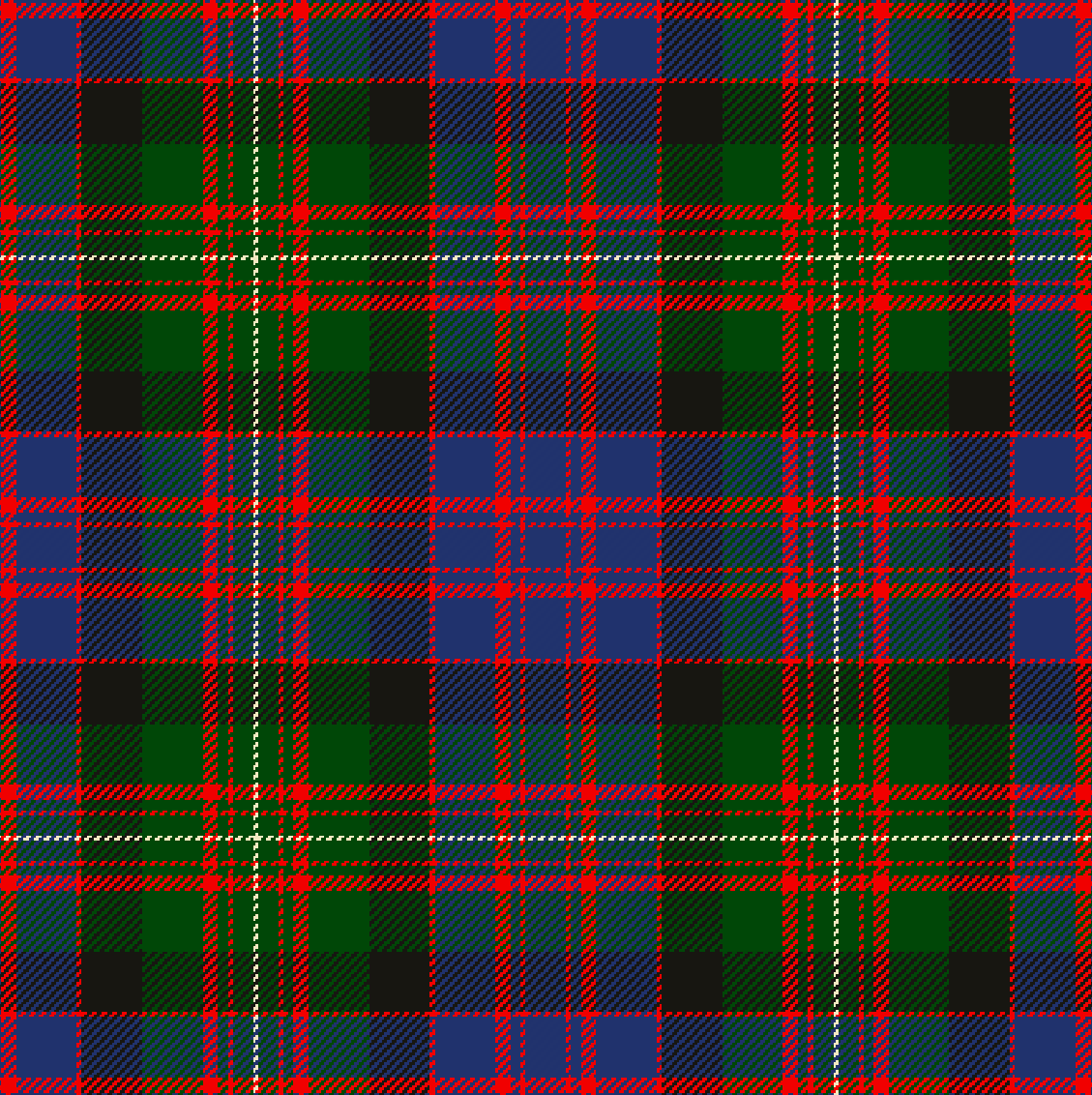
According to W & A K Johnston's 1906 edition, this tartan was registered for Clan MacDonell of Glengarry. There is a sample certified by 'Glengarry' in the Highland Society of London collection from 1815 to 1816, although it is unknown whether the thread count is accurate.

- Clan chief: Traditionally the chiefs of Clan MacDonell of Glengarry have been styled as "Mac Mhic Alasdair". The current chief of the clan is Colin Patrick MacDonell of Glengarry, who is the 24th chief of Clan MacDonell of Glengarry. The current chief's sloinneadh (or pedigree) is: Colin Patrick 'ic Aonghas Raghnall 'ic Aonghas Raghnall Dòmhnall 'ic Aonghas Raghnall 'ic Aonghas Raghnall Westdrop 'ic Aonghas Raghnall 'ic Tearlach Mac Raghnuill 'ic Alasdair Mac Raghnuill 'ic Aonghas Mac Raghnuill 'ic Alasdair Fiadhaich 'ic Donnchadh Mac Aonghais 'ic Alasdair Ruadh Mac Dòmhnuill 'ic Iain Mac Alasdair Dubh 'ic Alasdair Dubh Ghlinne Garraidh 'ic Raghnuill 'ic Aonghas Mac Alasdair Dheirg 'ic Dòmhnall Mac Aonghais 'ic Aonghas Aluinn 'ic Alasdair Mac Iain Mhic Alasdair 'ic Iain Mac Alasdair 'ic Alasdair na Coille 'ic Iain Mhic Raghnuill 'ic Dòmhnall Mac Raghnuill 'ic Raghnall nan Eilein 'ic Eoin 'ic Aonghais Og 'ic Aonghais Mhor 'ic Domhnaill 'ic Ragnhaill 'ic Somhairle.
- Chiefly arms: The current chief's coat of arms is blazoned: Or, an eagle displayed Gules surmounted of a lymphad Sable, her sails furled up and rigging proper, in the dexter chief point a dexter hand couped in fess of the Second and in the sinister a cross crosslet fitchee of the Third. Above the Shield is placed a Helmet befitting his degree, with a Mantling Gules doubled Argent, and on a Wreath of his Liveries is set for Crest a raven proper perching on a rock Azure, and in an Escrol over the same this Motto CRAGAN AN FHITHICH; on a Compartment below the Shield are placed for Supporters two bears each having an arrow pierced through his body all proper, and in an Escrol entwined with the Compartment this Motto PER MARE PER TERRAS..
- Clan member's crest badge: The crest badge is suitable for members of the MacDonell of Glengarry clan to wear, which consists of the heraldic crest and slogan. The crest is: A raven Proper perching on a rock Azure. The slogan within the crest badge is CREAGAN AN FHITICH, which translates from Scottish Gaelic as "The Rock of the Raven".
- Clan badge: The clan badge or plant badge attributed to the clan is common heather. This plant is attributed to the other MacDonald clans and some other associated clans such as Clan MacIntyre and the Macqueens of Skye.
- Pipe music: The bagpipe tune Spaidsearachd Mhic Mhic Alasdair (translation from Scottish Gaelic: "Glengarry's March") is attributed to the clan. Other pipe tunes that are associated with the clan are Failte Mhic Mhic Alasdair (Glengarry's salute), and Failte Moarair Bharasdal (Barrisdale's Salute). The clan uses Cumha Mhic Mhic Alasdair (Glengarry's Lament), Chuma Alasdair Dheirg (Alasdair Dearg, Younger of Glengarry, and Chuma Dhomhnaill an Lagain (Lament for Donald of Laggan, i.e. Donald MacAngus, 8th of Glengarry) as their laments, and the gathering music "Cillechriost" is also associated with the clan.

== See also ==
- Lord MacDonell, a title in the Jacobite Peerage
- Highland Clearances
- MacDonell, things named MacDonell on Wikipedia
- Chiefs of Clan MacDonell of Glengarry

== Sources ==
- Cobbett, William (1814). Cobbett's Complete Collection of State Trials And Proceedings For High Treason And Other Crimes And Misdemeanors (2011 ed.). Nabu Press. ISBN 1175882445.
- Davenport-Hines, Richard (2019). Enemies Within;. Williams Collins. ISBN 978-0007516698.
- Lang, Andrew (1897). Pickle the spy; or, The incognito of Prince Charles. Longmans Green.
- Mackenzie, Alexander (1881). Macdonalds of Glengarry. Allen County Public Library Genealogy Center. Inverness, A. & W. Mackenzie.
- Mackenzie, Alexander (1881a). History of the Macdonalds and Lords of the Isles; with genealogies of the principal families of the name. Inverness: A. & W. Mackenzie.
- The King's Jaunt, John Prebble, Birlinn Limited, Edinburgh 2000, ISBN 1-84158-068-6
- Preeble, John (1963). The Highland Clearances (1982 ed.). Martin Secker & Warburg Ltd. ISBN 978-0436386046.
- Clans and Tartans – Collins Pocket Reference, George Way of Plean and Romilly Squire, HarperCollins, Glasgow 1995 ISBN 0-00-470810-5
