= Invergarry Castle =

Castle in the Scottish Highlands

Coordinates: 57°03′57″N 4°46′51″W

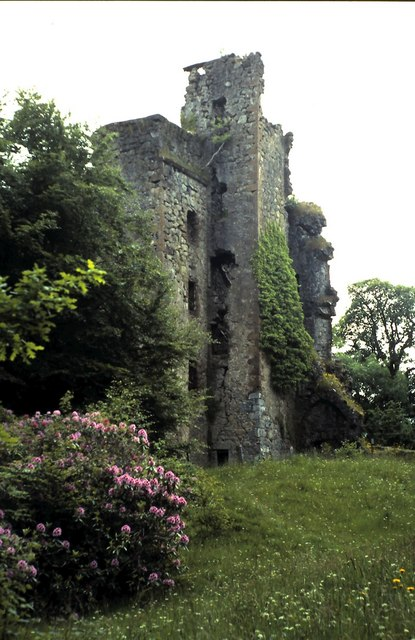
Invergarry Castle in 1994

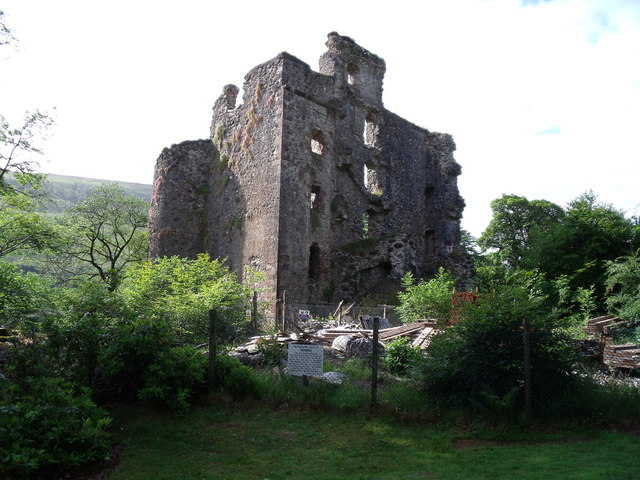
Invergarry Castle in 2009, after restoration work for stabilization.

Invergarry Castle near Invergarry in the Scottish Highlands was the seat of the Chiefs of the Clan MacDonell of Glengarry, a powerful branch of the Clan Donald.

The castle's position overlooking Loch Oich on Creagan an Fhithich – the Raven's Rock – in the Great Glen, was a strategic one in the days of clan warfare. It is not certain when the first structure was erected on Creagan an Fhithich but there are at least two sites prior to the present castle.

== Early history ==
After raids by the Clan Mackenzie in 1602 which included the burning of Strome Castle, the MacDonells of Glengarry fortified Creagan an Fhithich. The result was an imposing six storey L-plan tower house, although the exact form of the earlier castle is not known. According to clan tradition, the castle was built with stones passed hand to hand by a chain of clansmen from the mountain Ben Tee.

During the English Civil War, Oliver Cromwell's troops under General Monck burned the castle down in 1654. Repaired, it was held for King James VII of Scotland from 1688 until its surrender to the Government forces of William and Mary in 1692. It was then held by the Jacobites during the 1715 uprising, but taken for the government in 1716. During the 1745 uprising it was again held by Jacobites and visited twice by Bonnie Prince Charlie.

During the Jacobite risings of 1745 to 1746, Prince Charles Edward Stuart – "Bonnie Prince Charlie" – visited the Castle shortly after the raising of the Royal Standard at Glenfinnan and is said to have rested there after his defeat at the Battle of Culloden, in 1746. The MacDonells were closely involved throughout the Jacobite risings, Lord MacDonnell being a Member of the Prince's Council. In the aftermath of Culloden the castle was sacked and partially blown up by troops under the Duke of Cumberland as part of his systematic suppression of the Highlands.

However the stout walls refused to yield and have survived the centuries to serve as a reminder to their history. More prosaically, the Duke of Cumberland's men no doubt felt that they had 'slighted' the castle sufficiently by removing the SE wall and demolishing the NW "L" extension. The castle was never rebuilt, being abandoned by the MacDonells in favour of a new Invergarry House. This seems to have been commenced within a few years, Richard Pococke reporting this on his 1760 tour.

The Glengarry estates were sold by Aeneas Ranaldson MacDonell of Glengarry, the son of Alexander Ranaldson MacDonell of Glengarry (1771–1828), when he came of age, but he retained Invergarry Castle, Invergarry House, the "Well of Heads" and the ancient clan burial ground, which instead passed through Aeneas's daughter to the Erskine Cuninghames of Balgownie and Corrie.

== Architecture of the castle ==
The present structure completed post- c.1670 and by 1691 was designed on an "L" plan, with a substantial 'scale and platt' stair leading to the first floor in the NW part of the "L". From MacGibbon and Ross, the main building rose to five stories and the tower to six stories in height. The main building measured 55 by 32 feet (17 × 10 metres). The hall, on the first floor, measured 44 by 20 feet (13 × 6 metres). The main entrance was in the north wall of the NW wing of the castle, opposite the staircase. Accommodation would have been in the floors above the great hall. The un-vaulted basement most likely contained the kitchens.

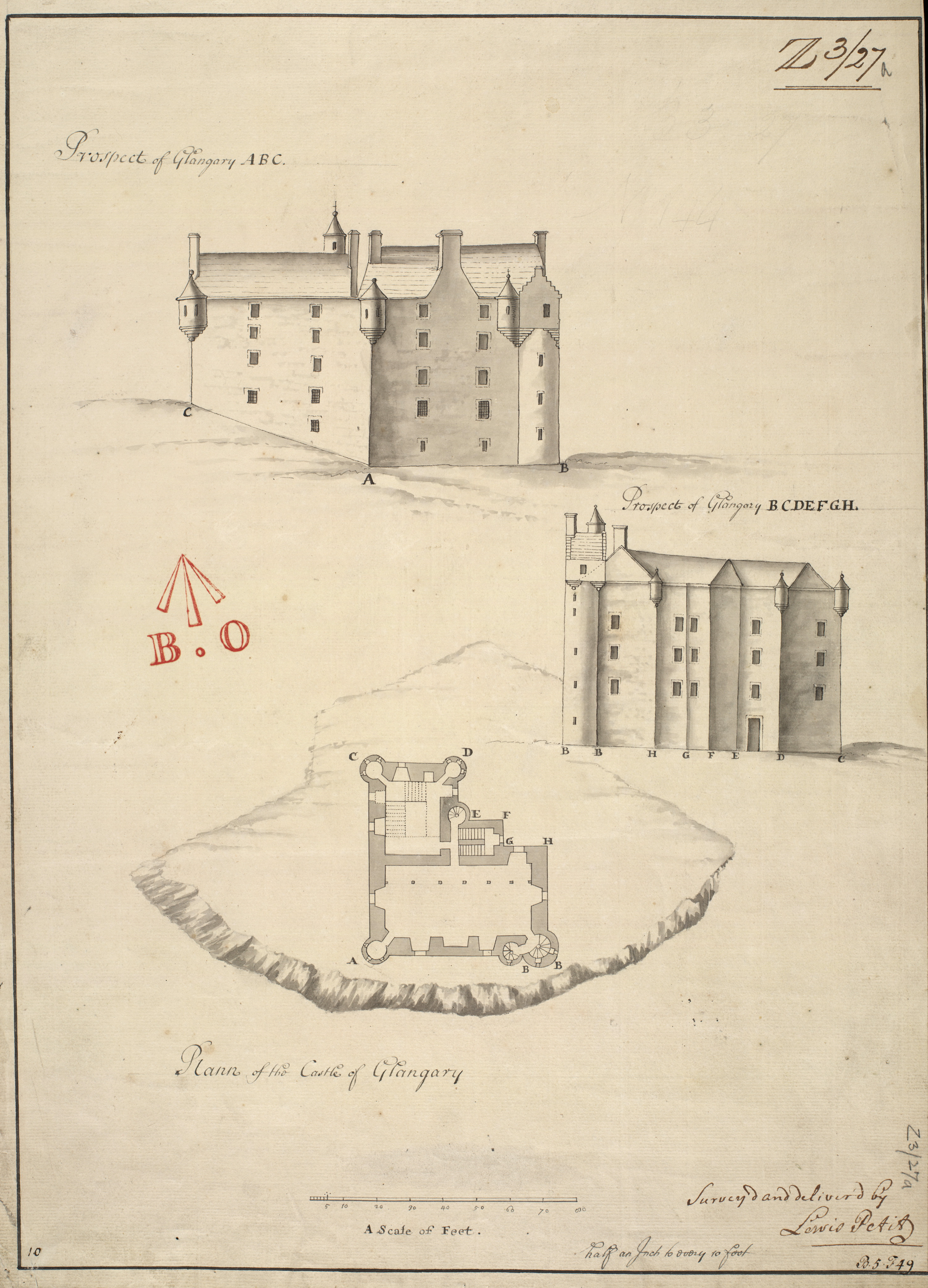
Invergarry Castle, Plan and Elevations, 1714. See 'Note on the 'Petit' survey drawing' below

In the wider picture of Scottish architecture, by this date Invergarry was a quite old fashioned design. As well, buildings such as Invergarry were not true fortified buildings, more 'country house' than castle. In its now ruinous state, it is difficult to appreciate the former appearance of the castle. However, an accurate representation of how the castle looked in the early 18th century, shortly after completion, is available. This is a drawing prepared in 1714 by the Board of Ordnance (see illustration left and note below). These 'military' drawings were prepared with considerable care and accuracy, so it reasonable to assume that this is a true representation of the castle as it was at that date.

This drawing was used by Charles McKean to prepare a conjectural reconstruction of the castle. While plainer and simpler, the castle very much follows the form of castles such as Crathes and Craigievar, with their tall narrow structure and wall top elaboration. While Invergarry had some six 'bartizans', it had no defensive parapets. Indeed, despite the thickness of the walls, a structure such as Invergarry would have stood very little military bombardment. The "L" wing with its open staircase was contained within a chamber approx 16 by 23 feet (5 × 7 metres), offering little defence.

At ground floor level, the castle did have some defensive elements including shot-holes and barred windows, also no doubt a stout door with an iron 'yett'. The thickness of some walls may be judged as being from the incorporation of elements of the former castle and simply the requirement for strength for a five storey building. The interior of the castle, especially the hall, would have been much richer than might be expected, with possibly painted ceilings, white painted walls with wall hangings such as tapestries, a large chimney piece and furniture.

Outside, the castle had a 'close' or courtyard or service yard. This would have contained various outbuildings, such as stables, workshops, a bakehouse, a brewhouse and other essential services. There would also most likely have been a barmkin or perimeter wall around the close. All traces of these buildings have gone.

== Later history ==
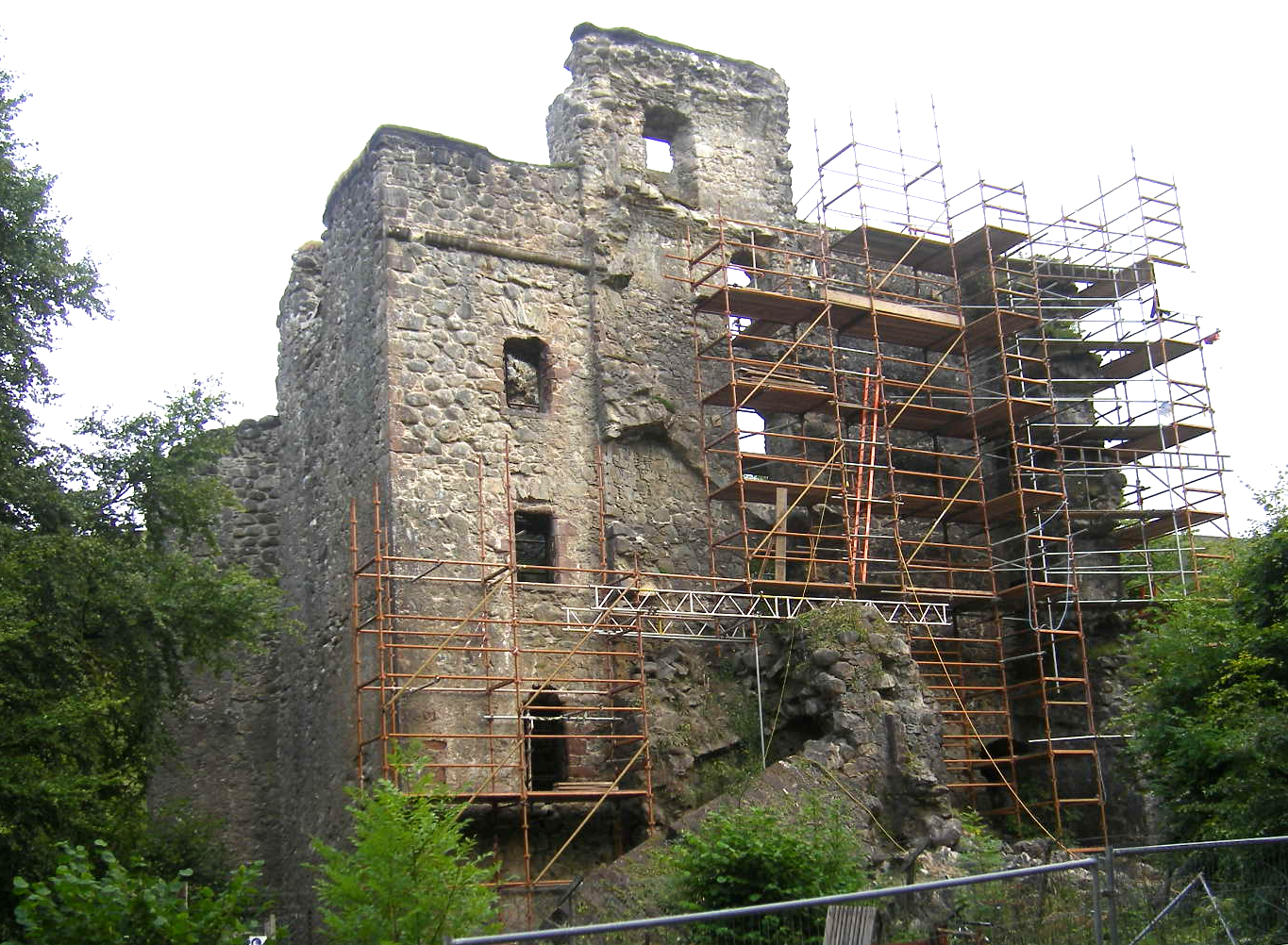
The Castle during conservation work in 2007

In 1960, the castle, Well of Heads and the burial ground were transferred to a trust, the 'Invergarry Castle Preservation Trust'. This trust is not linked in any way to the National Trust for Scotland, as stated on some websites.

The castle suffered a significant collapse circa 2000, when the remaining north staircase collapsed. This led to a programme of consolidation in 2007 (see photo), under the direction of Historic Scotland (now Historic Environment Scotland). This included the insertion of stabilising beams to the interior. A thorough account of the conservation work is contained in Fawcett & Rutherford, 'Renewed Life for Scottish Castles', Chapter Ten. The ruined castle is a scheduled monument.

In 1957, the Glengarry News printed a call to all McDonalds, MacDonalds, MacDonells and all members of Clan Donald to donate a pound (equivalent to US$3.00 at the time) to a fund to preserve Invergarry Castle. In 1960 Invergarry House was reborn as the Glengarry Castle Hotel. It enjoys an enviable position overlooking Loch Oich, with the added attraction of the ruins of Invergarry Castle in the grounds.

== Note on the Petit survey drawing ==
Brigadier General Lewis Petit des Etans was a French engineer, employed by the British Army for nearly 30 years. In 1714, he was sent to Scotland in charge of a Board of Ordnance Engineer Train or Corps, this in response to the threatened Jacobite rebellion in the north of Scotland. One of the Board's tasks was to survey all structures which could have a 'military' implication.

The National Library of Scotland holds a collection of eighteen drawings 'signed off' by Petit (including some later duplicates.) As Petit was the commanding officer, it seems unlike that he personally carried out the surveying. It will be noted that his statement, 'Survey'd and delivered by Lewis Petit' is in a different hand and ink from the Title and other annotations on the survey drawing.

The survey drawing shows a plan and elevations of the castle, called the 'Castle of Glangary' on the drawing. The drawing may appear misleading, as more than one facade is joined together, but by cross-referencing the lettering on the plan to the elevations the appearance can be judged.

The plan (at first floor/hall level) shows the importance of the main staircase in the NW extension. The elevations reveal the tall narrow form of the building, with several bartizans and a cap-house, but no other defensive elements at wall top level. The drawing shows no outerworks such as a barmkin wall or service buildings. As the plan was prepared for 'military' purposes, it may not have been thought necessary at the time.

(Reproduced by permission of the National Library of Scotland.)

== See also ==
- Clan MacDonell of Glengarry
- Scottish Baronial Architecture
- List of castles in Scotland
- Scheduled monuments in Highland
