= Alexander Ranaldson Macdonell =

Scottish clan chief

Alexander Ranaldson MacDonell of Glengarry
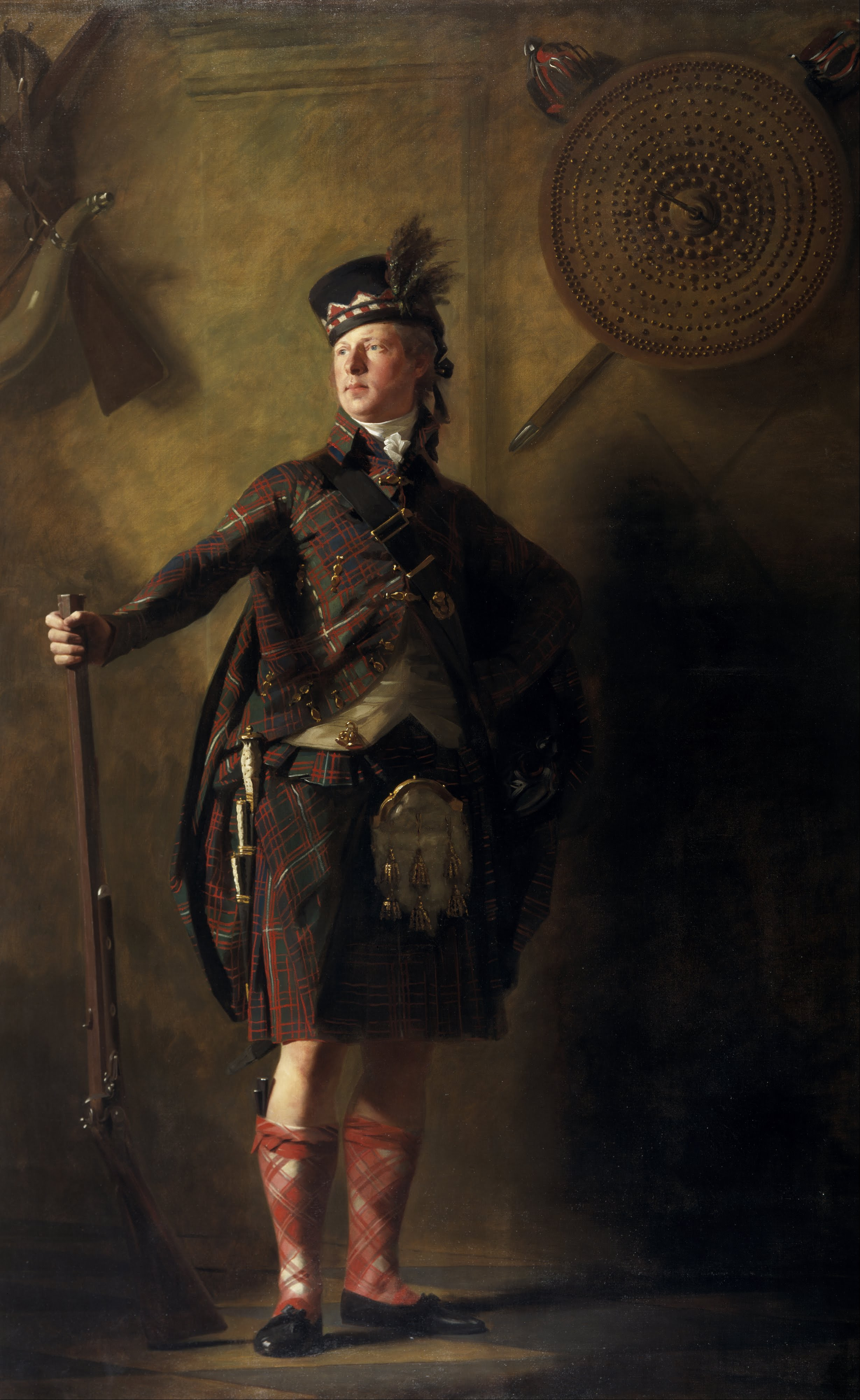
- Portrait of MacDonell of Glengarry in 1812 by Henry Raeburn.
- Born: 15 September 1773
- Died: 17 January 1828 (aged 54)
- Education: University College, Oxford
- Known for: 15th chief of Clan MacDonell of Glengarry

Colonel Alexander Ranaldson MacDonell of Glengarry (15 September 1773 – 17 January 1828), sometimes called by the Gaelic version of his name, Alastair or Alasdair, was clan chief of Clan MacDonell of Glengarry. As was customary for a laird (landed proprietor in Scotland), MacDonell was often called Glengarry after his principal estate.

Glengarry's haughty and flamboyant personality, as expressed in his character and behaviour, gave Walter Scott the model for the wild Highland clan chieftain Fergus Mac-Ivor in the pioneering 1810 historical novel Waverley. Glengarry was the fifth Lord MacDonell in the Jacobite peerage.

== Life ==
He was born on 15 September 1773, the eldest of the nine children of Duncan Macdonell (c. 1744–1788), chief of Clan Macdonell of Glengarry, by his marriage to Marjory Grant (1744–1792), of Dalvey.

In 1788, he became the 15th chief of Clan MacDonell of Glengarry, inheriting huge estates from Glengarry in the Great Glen to Knoydart on the Atlantic. In 1790. he entered University College, Oxford.

In February 1793, after war with France had begun, Macdonell was commissioned as a captain to recruit a company of the Strathspey Fencibles, raised by Sir James Grant, a kinsman. In August 1794, he was given a colonel's commission to raise the Glengarry Fencibles regiment of Glengarry Highlanders, recruits being drawn from the Glengarry estates, under threat of eviction if persuasion did not work. Glengarry commanded his regiment in Guernsey until August 1796, when he resigned. His hope of a career as a regular officer in the British Army had been undermined by his commander-in-chief, the Duke of York and Albany, perhaps due to concerns about his character.

As part of his regiment's uniform, he invented (or adopted) the Glengarry, a type of cap which he is wearing in his portrait. The boat-shaped cap without a peak is made of thick-milled woollen material with a toorie (or bobble) on the top and ribbons hanging down behind, capable of being folded flat. It has become part of the uniform of a number of Scottish regiments, with variations in the band around above the brim and in the colours.

The Glengarry fencibles were disbanded in 1802, and Glengarry failed to honour a pledge to find land for the men. This resulted in a mass emigration to British North America led by Father Alexander Macdonell, the regimental chaplain.

He bitterly feuded with Thomas Telford and the Commissioners of the Caledonian Canal as it was being constructed through his land, though he collected useful dues from them.

Glengarry considered himself the last genuine specimen of a Highland chief, always wore the Highland dress (kilt or trews) and in the style of his ancestors seldom travelled without being followed by his "tail", armed servants in full Highland dress who had traditional duties such as carrying his sword and shield, standing sentinel, acting as bard and carrying him dry across streams.

He was a member of the Highland Society and the Celtic Society of Edinburgh, and in June 1815 formed his own Society of True Highlanders, subsequently leaving the Celtic Society and complaining that "their general appearance is assumed and fictitious, and they have no right to burlesque the national character or dress of the Highlands". His mortification at the acceptance of Lowlanders became a bitter complaint about the prominent role the Celtic Society had in the visit of King George IV to Scotland, and he made several unauthorised and flamboyant appearances during the visit, to the annoyance of his friend Walter Scott and the other organisers, but causing no more than mild amusement to the King.

In 1824 Glengarry unsuccessfully attempted to wrest the chiefship of Clan Donald from Ranald George Macdonald by bringing an action in the Court of Session.

== Clearances ==
Although Scott wrote of Glengarry in his misleading hagiography "He is a kind of Quixote in our age, having retained, in their full extent, the whole feelings of clanship and chieftainship, elsewhere so long abandoned", under his authority timber was felled for sale, the cleared land was leased to sheep farmers and many of his clansmen were forced from the land by increasing rents and evictions. He continued the evictions to make way for sheep farmers which his mother began when his father was chieftain, and most of the clan was forced to emigrate to British North America, as part of what was later known as the Highland Clearances. Robert Burns wrote a satirical poem about Glengarry in the Address of Beelzebub.

His life was in stark contrast to his contemporary relative Bishop Alexander MacDonell who did missionary duty in Lochaber and tried to help his clansmen displaced by the substitution of sheep-farms for smallholdings to get employment in the Lowlands. In 1794 he organised the formation of the 1st Glengarry Fencible regiment, commanded by his kinsman Glengarry, with himself as chaplain. When the regiment was disbanded the bishop arranged a tract of land in Canada in 1804 and went with them.

== Death ==
On 17 January 1828, Glengarry perished at Corran on Loch Linnhe from an attack of brain fever which followed an accident during his escape from a steamer which had gone aground. According to the Inverness Courier, the funeral procession of five miles from Invergarry to Kilfinnan was followed by 1,500 men and 150 gentry, the coffin being carried breast-high by eighteen Highlanders. Glengarry's personal piper, Archie Munro, composed a lament, as did the blind household bard, Allan MacDougall. As Brian Osborne records, "In Edinburgh Sir Walter Scott was moved to compose Glengarry's Death Song, an undoubted expression of his genuine affection for the dead chief, if not perhaps a work of the greatest literary quality".

== Family ==
On 20 January 1802, Glengarry married Rebecca, the second daughter of Sir William Forbes, 6th Baronet, of Pitsligo. Their children were a son, Aeneas Ranaldson, born on 29 July 1808, and seven daughters, Elizabeth, Marcelly, Jemima Rebecca, Louisa Christian, Caroline Hester, Gulielmina Forbes, and Euphemia Margaret.

Glengarry's estate was much mortgaged and encumbered. In 1840, after his only son and heir, Aeneas Ranaldson MacDonell, had come of age he sold the Glengarry part of the estate to Lord Ward, later Earl of Dudley, for £91,000. Some years later Aeneas sold the Knoydart estate to a Mr Baird. Aeneas died at Invergarry on 19 June 1852, leaving three sons, Alexander Ranaldson (1834–1862), Aeneas Robert (1835–1855) and Charles Ranaldson (1838–1868). Alexander emigrated to Australia and died unmarried in Dunedin, New Zealand, in 1862. Aeneas drowned at the age of twenty and Charles died at sea in 1868 on his way home from New Zealand. Of their three sisters, only one, Helen Rebecca, married and had children, and by 1887 she was her father's sole heir. She married in 1865 Captain John Cuninghame of Balgownie, Fife, leaving descendants.

Glengarry's sixth daughter, Gulielmina, married Hugh Horatio Brown, a Midlothian advocate, and was the mother of the Venice historian Horatio Brown.
