= Strome Castle =

Ruined castle in the Scottish Highlands

Coordinates: 57°21′32.93″N 5°33′21.08″W

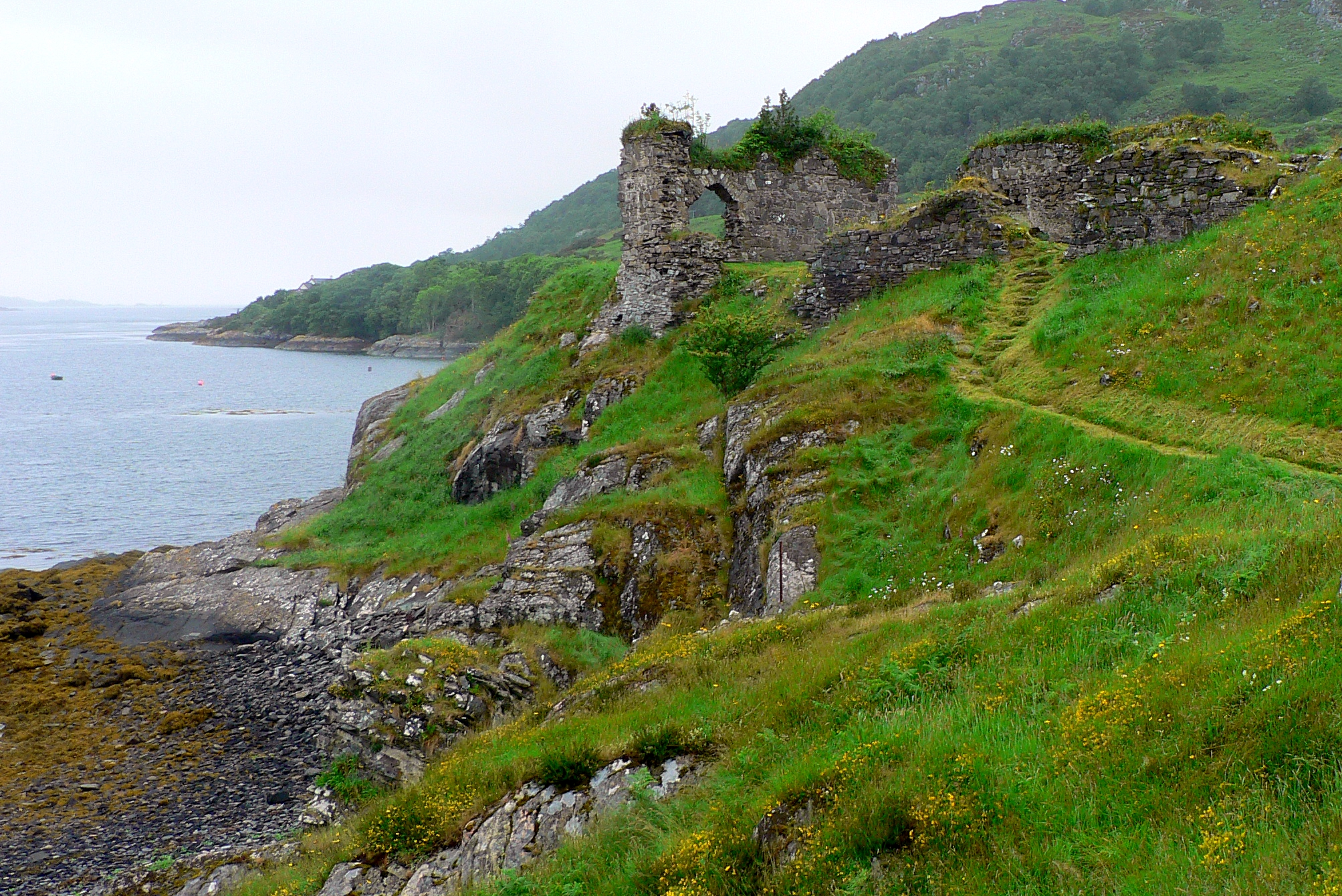
Strome Castle on the shore of Loch Carron

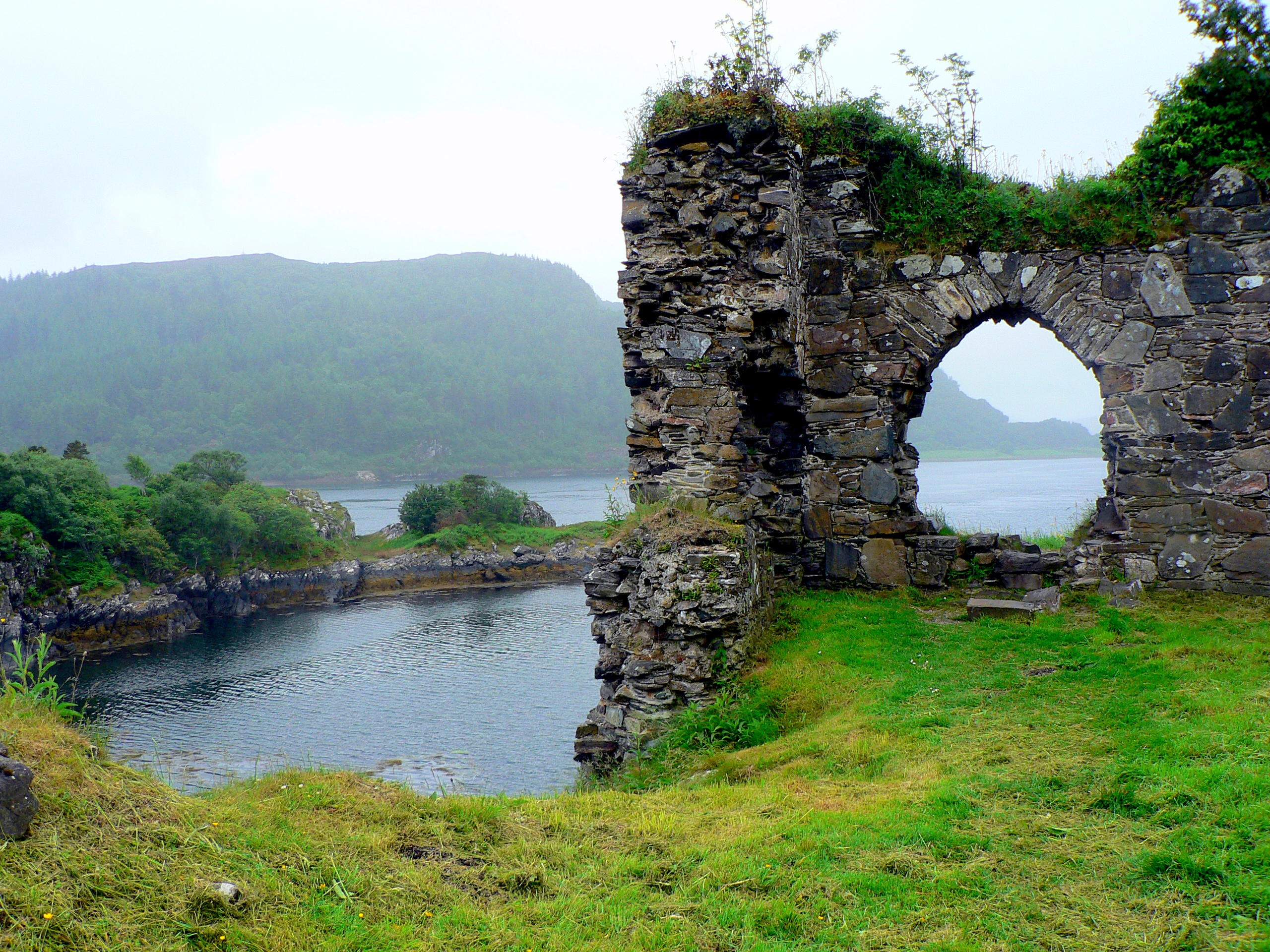
Strome Castle ruins

Strome Castle is a ruined castle on the shore of Loch Carron in Stromemore, 3.5 miles south-west of the village of Lochcarron, on the headland between Loch Carron and Loch Kishorn, on the west coast of the Scottish Highlands.

== History ==
The castle was originally built by Alexander MacDonald, Lord of the Isles and Earl of Ross in the 15th century. In 1472, the castle was owned by his eldest son, Celestine of Lochalsh, Clan MacDonald of Lochalsh. Alan MacDonald Dubh, 12th Chief of the Clan Cameron was constable on behalf of the MacDonalds of Lochalsh.

In 1539 King James V of Scotland granted the castle to the Clan MacDonell of Glengarry and Hector Munro, I of Erribol, of the Clan Munro was constable of the castle for the MacDonells of Glengarry.

In the aftermath of the Battle of Morar which took place in 1602, the castle was besieged by Kenneth Mackenzie, 1st Lord Mackenzie of Kintail, chief of the Clan Mackenzie, assisted by their allies the Clan Matheson and Andrew Munro of Novar. After the MacDonells surrendered it was demolished and blown up. The MacDonells of Glengarry built a new castle further inland called Invergarry Castle.

In 1939 the ruined Strome Castle was presented to the National Trust for Scotland. Today the castle comprises a courtyard and the remains of a square tower.
