= Ranald MacDonald (founder of Clanranald) =

Ranald MacDonald was the eponymous ancestor of the MacDonalds of Clanranald and the MacDonells of Glengarry. He was a son of John MacDonald, Lord of the Isles (d. 1386), and his first wife Amie MacRory. John granted Ranald the lands of Garmoran, which he had acquired through his marriage to Amie. This grant may have been a form of compensation for Ranald's exclusion from the main inheritance of the family, which fell to Donald, the eldest son of John's second marriage (to Margaret, daughter of Robert II of Scotland). The Uists were later detached from Garmoran and given to Ranald's younger brother, Godfrey.

Ranald died at Tioram Castle in 1386, and was buried on Iona. A cross-shaft found on Texa bears the following Latin inscription: HEC EST CRUX REGNALDI JOHIS DE ISLA ("this is the cross of Ranald [son of] John of Islay"). The shaft depicts a Hebridean warrior armed with an axe, which may well be the earliest surviving depiction of a MacDonald. From Ranald descend the MacDonalds of Clanranald, and the MacDonells of Glengarry.
