= Clann Ruaidhrí =

Medieval Scottish clan

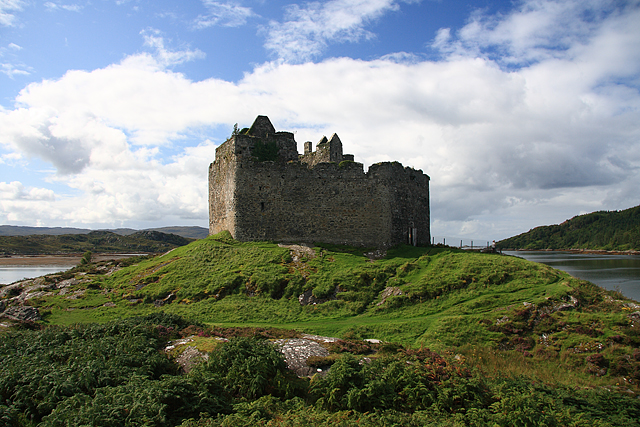
Now-ruinous Castle Tioram may well have been a Clann Ruaidhrí stronghold. The island the fortress sits upon is first recorded in a charter of Cairistíona Nic Ruaidhrí. According to early modern tradition, the castle was erected in the fourteenth century by her niece, Áine Nic Ruaidhrí. The castle served as the seat of the latter's Clann Domhnaill descendants for the next four hundred years.

Clann Ruaidhrí was a leading medieval clan in the Hebrides and the western seaboard of Scotland. (Note: Since the 1990s, academics have accorded the kindred various names in English secondary sources: Clan MacRuari, Clan Ruairi, Clan Ruari, clan Ruari, Clann Ruaidhrí, Clann Ruaidrí, Clann Ruairi, Clann Ruairidh, the mac Ruairi kindred, the Mac Ruairis, the Mac Ruairís, the Mac Ruaris, the MacRuaidhris, the MacRuaidrí dynasty, the MacRuaidridhs, the MacRuairidh family, the MacRuairidhs, the MacRuairies, the MacRuairis, the MacRuaridhs, the MacRuari family, the Macruaries, the MacRuaries, the MacRuaris, the Macruari dynasty, Macruaris, the meic Ruaidhrí, the meic Ruaidrí, the Meic Ruaidrí, the meic Ruairidh family, the meic Ruairidh, the meic Ruaridh, the Mhic Ruaidhrí kin, the Mhic Ruaidhrí, the MhicRuairidhs, and the Mic Ruaidhri.) The eponymous ancestor of the family was Ruaidhrí mac Raghnaill, a principal member of Clann Somhairle in the thirteenth century. Members of Clann Ruaidhrí were factors in both the histories of the Kingdom of the Isles and the Kingdom of Scotland in the thirteenth- and fourteenth centuries. The family appears to have held power in Kintyre in the thirteenth century. By the fourteenth century, the family controlled an extensive provincial lordship stretching along the north-western Scottish coast and into the Hebrides. As a leading force in the Kingdom of the Isles, the family fiercely opposed Scottish authority. With the collapse of Norwegian hegemony in the region, the family nimbly integrated itself into the Kingdom of Scotland.

Members of Clann Ruaidhrí distinguished themselves in the First War of Scottish Independence, opposing adherents of both the English and Scottish Crowns. Like other branches of Clann Somhairle, Clann Ruaidhrí was a noted exporter of gallowglass warriors into Ireland. The mid fourteenth century saw the diminishment of the family in both Scotland and Ireland. The last Irish gallowglass captain appears on record in 1342, whilst the last great chief of the family was assassinated in 1346. Following the latter's death, the Clann Ruaidhrí lordship passed into the possession of the chief of Clann Domhnaill, a distant Clann Somhairle kinsman, and thereby formed a significant part of the Clann Domhnaill Lordship of the Isles. There is reason to suspect that the lines of the family may have continued on, albeit in a much diminished capacity, with one apparent member holding power as late as the early fifteenth century.

== Clann Somhairle ==
Simplified pedigree of Clann Somhairle and Clann Ruaidhrí. Feminine names are italicised. Conjectured relationships are labelled with a question marks. The eponyms of Clann Dubhghaill, Clann Ruaidhrí, and Clann Domhnaill are highlighted.

Somhairle
Dubhghall	Raghnall
Ruaidhrí	Domhnall
Dubhghall	daughter ?	daughter ?	Ailéan
daughter	Eiríkr	Donnchadh	Cairistíona	Lachlann	Ruaidhrí
Áine	Raghnall	Eóghan ?

== Kingdom of the Isles ==
=== Ruaidhrí mac Raghnaill ===
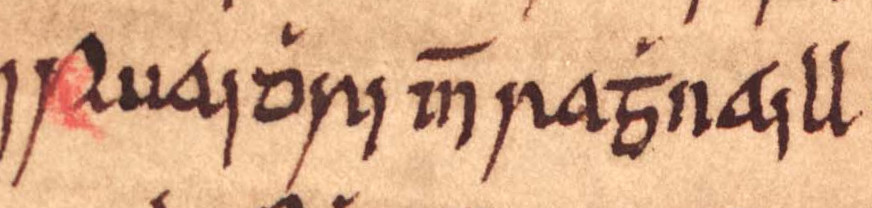
The name of Ruaidhrí mac Raghnaill as it appears on folio 63r of Oxford Bodleian Library Rawlinson B 489 (the Annals of Ulster).

Clann Ruaidhrí was a branch of Clann Somhairle. Other branches of this overarching kindred included Clann Dubhghaill and Clann Domhnaill. The eponymous ancestor of Clann Ruaidhrí was Ruaidhrí mac Raghnaill, Lord of Argyll, a paternal grandson of Somhairle mac Giolla Brighde, King of the Isles, the common ancestor of Clann Somhairle. Ruaidhrí's father, Raghnall mac Somhairle, was also the father of Domhnall mac Raghnaill, eponym of Clann Domhnaill. Somhairle's abrupt death in battle in 1164, coupled with the vast territorial extent of his offspring, may account for the rapid fracturing of Clann Somhairle into rival segments.

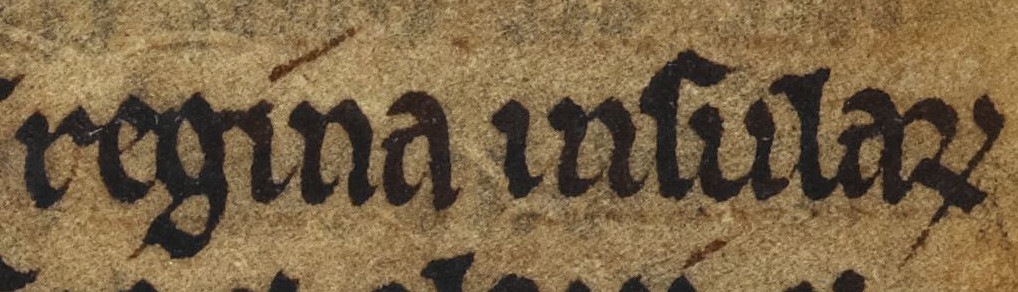
The title of the apparent Clann Ruaidhrí wife of Rǫgnvaldr Guðrøðarson as it appears on folio 42v of British Library Cotton Julius A VII (the Chronicle of Mann): "regina Insularum" ("Queen of the Isles").

Ruaidhrí was probably the senior of Raghnall's sons. Whilst Ruaidhrí is likely one of the unnamed sons of Raghnall who is recorded to have campaigned with Thomas fitz Roland, Earl of Atholl against the Irish in 1211/1212, he is certainly reported to have assisted Thomas in the ravaging of Derry and surrounding countryside in 1213/1214. These seaborne operations may have been undertaken in the context of supporting the Irish interests of Rǫgnvaldr Guðrøðarson, King of the Isles, who seems to have been under pressure during this period. It is also possible that the raids were conducted in the interests of both the Scottish and English Crowns, and particularly aimed at limiting Irish support of the Meic Uilleim, a discontented rival branch of the Scottish royal family.

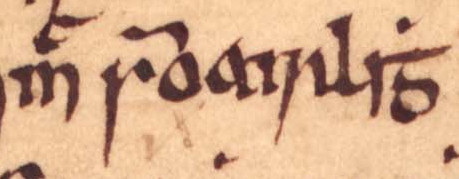
The name of Mac Somhairle, a man who may be identical to Ruaidhrí himself, as it appears on folio 67r of Oxford Bodleian Library Rawlinson B 489.

By the second decade of the thirteenth century, Ruaidhrí may have been the principal member of Clann Somhairle, and appears to have overseen an important marital alliance with the two foremost members of the Crovan dynasty. Rǫgnvaldr, and his younger half-brother Óláfr, are recorded to have married the daughters of an unidentified nobleman from Kintyre, and given that Ruaidhrí and his father are known to have been styled Lord of Kintyre suggests that either man could have been the father of the brides. The marital alliance appears to have been orchestrated in an effort to patch up relations between Clann Somhairle and the Crovan dynasty, neighbouring kindreds who had bitterly contested the kingship of the Isles for about sixty years. It is possible that Rǫgnvaldr's kingship was formally recognised by Ruaidhrí, who thereby established himself as a leading magnate within a reunified Kingdom of the Isles. Since the majority of Ruaidhrí's territories appear to have been mainland possessions, it is very likely that the Scottish Crown regarded this reunification as a threat to its own claims of overlordship of Argyll. Apprehension of this rejuvenated island realm may have been one of the factors that led to Ruaidhrí's apparent expulsion from Kintyre by the royal forces of Alexander II, King of Scotland in the early 1220s.

=== Dubhghall mac Ruaidhrí, and Ailéan mac Ruaidhrí ===
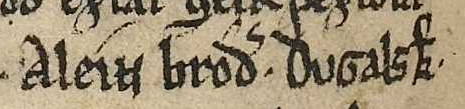
The names of Ruaidhrí's sons, Ailéan and Dubhghall, as they appear on folio 122v of AM 45 fol (Codex Frisianus): "Aleinn broðir Dvggals konvngs". The excerpt notes the brothers' kinship and styles Dubhghall a king.

There is reason to suspect that Ruaidhrí is identical to the Clann Somhairle dynast, named in surviving sources only as Mac Somhairle, who was killed whilst resisting an English invasion of Tír Chonaill in 1247. Immediately after this event, Clann Ruaidhrí was certainly represented by Ruaidhrí's son, Dubhghall. Under the later, the kindred certainly involved itself against the English in Ireland. In 1258, Dubhghall is recorded to have clashed with and killed Jordan d'Exeter, the English Sheriff of Connacht. The following year, Aodh na nGall Ó Conchobhair, son of the Uí Conchobhair King of Connacht, is recorded to have married a daughter of Dubhghall, and to have received a tocher of one hundred and sixty gallowglass warriors commanded by Dubhghall's younger brother, Ailéan. Ailéan is, therefore, one of the earliest known warriors of this type. Along with Dubhghall's naval operations of the previous year, the marital alliance between the Uí Conchobhair and Clann Ruaidhrí appears to have formed part of a carefully coordinated plan to tackle English power in the north west of Ireland. Nevertheless, Aodh na nGall and his allies were utterly crushed in battle in 1260, a conflict in which the Clann Ruaidhrí gallowglasses may well have fought.

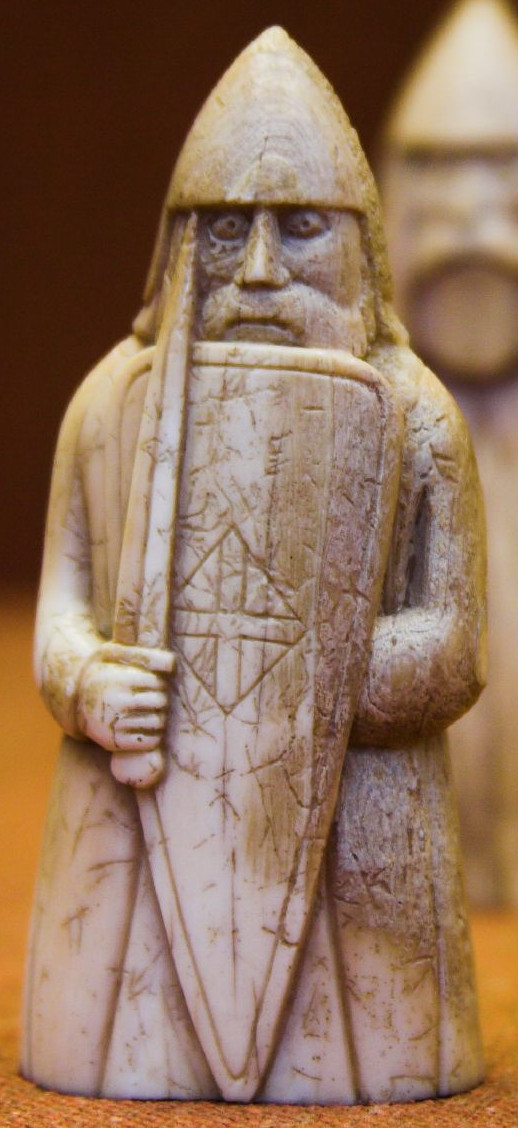
One of the rook gaming pieces of the so-called Lewis chessmen. The Scandinavian connections of leading members of the Isles may have been reflected in their military armament, and could have resembled that depicted upon such gaming pieces.

The year after Mac Somhairle's death in 1247, Dubhghall and the chief of Clann Dubhghaill, Eóghan Mac Dubhghaill, both travelled to Norway seeking the kingship of the northern Suðreyjar from Hákon Hákonarson, King of Norway. Although the entirety of the Suðreyjar roughly encompassed the Hebrides and Mann, the precise jurisdiction which Dubhghall and Eóghan competed for is uncertain. For example, the northern Hebridean islands of Lewis and Harris and Skye appear to have been held by the Crovan dynasty, then represented by the reigning Haraldr Óláfsson, King of the Isles. Whatever the case, it is possible that the events of 1247 and 1248 were related, and that Dubhghall and Eóghan sought to succeed Mac Somhairle's position in the Isles.

It was only after the unexpected death of Haraldr in 1248 that Hákon sent Eóghan west over sea to temporarily take up the kingship of the Isles on his behalf. Eóghan, however, was not only a Norwegian dependant in the Isles, but an eminent Scottish magnate on the mainland. Although the Scottish Crown appears to have attempted to purchase the Isles earlier that decade, Eóghan's acceptance of Hákon's commission led Alexander II to unleash an invasion of Argyll in the summer of 1249, directed at the very heart of the Clann Dubhghaill lordship. The unfolding crisis only ended with the Scottish king's untimely death in July 1249. Eóghan appears to have been utterly dispossessed by the Scots a result of their invasion. In fact, his apparent displacement could well have upended the hierarchy of Clann Somhairle. For instance, within the very year that Eóghan was forced from Argyll by the Scots, Dubhghall is recorded to have "took kingship" in the Isles. This record could reveal that Dubhghall assumed the kingship from a severely weakened Eóghan.

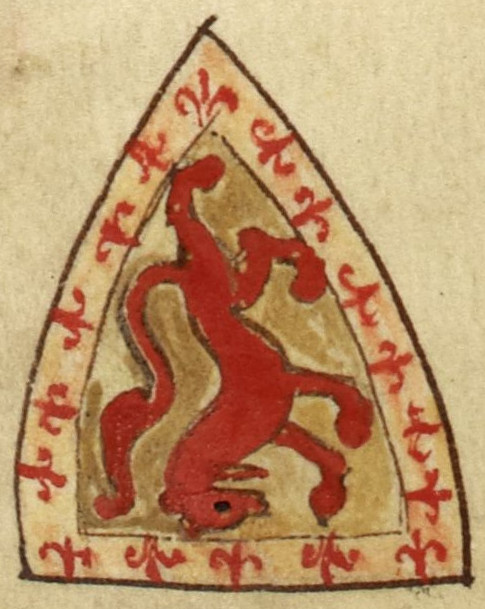
The arms of Alexander II depicted on folio 146v of British Library Royal 14 C VII (Historia Anglorum). The inverted shield represents the king's death in 1249.

With the death of Alexander II in 1249, the Scottish invasion of the Argyll and the Isles came to an abrupt end. About a decade later, the latter's son and royal successor, Alexander III, came of age and took steps to continue his father's westward expansion. In 1261, the Scottish Crown sent envoys to Norway offering to purchase the Hebrides from Hákon. Once the Norwegians rejected the offer, the Scots are recorded to have lashed out against the Islesmen in a particularly savage assault upon the inhabitants of Skye. Thus provoked, Hákon assembled an enormous fleet to reassert Norwegian sovereignty along the north and western coast of Scotland. In July 1263, this armada disembarked from Norway, and by mid August, Hákon reaffirmed his overlordship in Shetland and Orkney, forced the submission of Caithness, and arrived in the Hebrides.

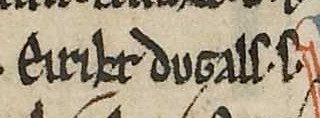
The name of Dubhghall's son, Eiríkr, as it appears on folio 122r of AM 45 fol (Codex Frisianus): "Eirikr Dvggalsson". With the demise of the independent Kingdom of the Isles in 1266, Eiríkr remained a Norwegian subject.

Both Dubhghall and Ailéan are recorded to have played a significant part in Hákon's campaign against the Scots. Although a near contemporary Scandinavian source declares that the operation was an overwhelming triumph, it seems to have been an utter failure instead. Not only had Hákon failed to break Scottish power, but Alexander III seized the initiative in the following year, and oversaw a series of invasions into the Isles and northern Scotland. Recognising this dramatic shift in royal authority, Magnús Óláfsson, King of Mann and the Isles submitted to Alexander III within the year, and in so doing, symbolised the complete collapse of Norwegian sovereignty in the Isles. Dubhghall, on the other hand, contrasted many of his compatriots from the Isles, and stubbornly refused to submit to the Scottish Crown. Although he is recorded to have continued the resistance, all came to naught when the Norwegian Crown was finally forced to transfer possession of the Isles to the Scottish Crown in 1266.

Although it is possible that Dubhghall's power base had been located in Garmoran and perhaps Uist, there is uncertainty as to how and when these territories entered into the possession of his family. Later leading members of Clann Ruaidhrí certainly possessed these lands, but evidence of custody before the mid thirteenth century is lacking. In theory, these territories could have been taken over by the kindred—perhaps awarded to them—following the Scots' acquisition of the Isles in 1266. On the other hand, the family's position in Garmoran and the Hebrides may have stemmed from its marital alliance with the Crovan dynasty, an affiliation undertaken at some point before Ruaidhrí's expulsion from Kintyre. (Note: It is also possible that the mainland territories of Clann Ruaidhrí were lands earlier possessed by Somhairle, and that the island territories passed from the Crovan dynasty to Clann Somhairle by way of Somhairle's wife, Ragnhildr Óláfsdóttir.) Another member of the kindred may have been Ruðri, a man who—with his two brothers—is recorded to have sworn allegiance to Hákon in 1263, and to have contributed to the latter's overseas campaign. Ruðri is stated to have claimed Bute as his birthright, and to have received possession of the island from the Norwegian king upon the conclusion of his campaign of 1263.

Mac Ruaidhrí

Mac Ruaidhrí, king of the islands,
with bright cheek,
lovely your head above your collar,
it's your nature.

— a fragment of poetry which appears to refer to a son of Ruaidhrí mac Ragnaill or a later member of Clann Ruaidhrí. This composition is one many preserved by a fourteenth-century tract on metrical faults, and appears to be the work of poets employed by the ruling families of the Hebrides.

== Kingdom of Scotland ==
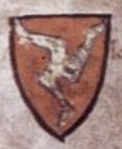
The arms attributed to the King of Mann depicted in the late thirteenth-century Armorial Wijnbergen. (Note: The coat of arms seems to have been first associated with Mann after the Scots took possession of the island in the last half of the thirteenth century. The adoption of a new heraldic device—the triskeles—may have been used as a means of reinforcing the new regime on the island.)

=== Ailéan mac Ruaidhrí ===
In the wake of the Scots' acquisition of the Isles, and Dubhghall's death within the decade, Clann Ruaidhrí disappears from the Scottish historical record. When the kindred finally reemerges in 1275, it is in the person of Ailéan himself, by then a prominent Scottish magnate, and representative of Clann Ruaidhrí. That year, Magnús' illegitimate son, Guðrøðr, led a revolt on Mann against the Scottish Crown, and Alexander III responded by sending a massive invasion force to restore royal authority. Of the recorded Scottish commanders, two were members of Clann Somhairle: Alasdair Mac Dubhghaill, Lord of Argyll, and Ailéan himself. The Clann Somhairle dimension to this campaign, as agents of the Scottish Crown's authority, clearly exemplifies the extent at which the kindred had been incorporated into Scottish realm. In 1284, Ailéan was one of the many Scottish magnates who attended a government council at Scone which acknowledged Margaret, granddaughter of Alexander III, as the king's rightful heir. The inclusion of Ailéan, and two of his Clann Somhairle kinsmen—Alasdair Mac Dubhghaill and Aonghus Mór mac Domhnaill, Lord of Islay—further illustrates the kindred's incorporation within the Scottish realm.

=== Lachlann Mac Ruaidhrí, and Ruaidhrí Mac Ruaidhrí ===
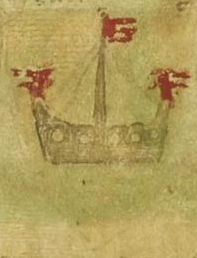
The arms of the Lord of Argyll depicted in the fourteenth-century Balliol Roll. (Note: The escutcheon is blazoned: or, a galley sable with dragon heads at prow and stern and flag flying gules, charged on the hull with four portholes argent. The coat of arms corresponds to the thirteenth-century seal of Alasdair Mac Dubhghaill, Lachlann's father-in-law, distant kinsman, and ally. Since the galley was a symbol borne by members of Clann Dubhghaill and Clann Domhnaill, it is conceivable that the galley was also a symbol of Somhairle himself. It was also a symbol of the Crovan dynasty, which could mean that it passed to Somhairle's family through his wife.)

In 1293, in an effort to maintain peace in the western reaches of his realm, John, King of Scotland established the shrievalties of Skye and Lorn. The former region—consisting of Wester Ross, Glenelg, Skye, Lewis and Harris, Uist, Barra, Eigg, Rhum, and the Small Isles—was given to William II, Earl of Ross, whilst the latter region—consisting of Argyll (except Cowal and Kintyre), Mull, Jura and Islay—was given to Alasdair Mac Dubhghaill. Despite the king's intentions, his new sheriffs seem to have used their positions to exploit royal power against local rivals. Whilst Clann Domhnaill was forced to deal with their powerful Clann Dubhghaill rivals, Clann Ruaidhrí appears to have fallen afoul of the Earl of Ross over control of Kintail, Skye, and Uist. Evidence of the earl's actions against Clann Ruaidhrí is revealed in correspondence between him and the English Crown in 1304. In this particular communiqué, William II recalled a costly military campaign which he had conducted in the 1290s against rebellious Hebridean chieftains—including Lachlann himself—at the behest of the then-reigning John (reigned 1292–1296).

Ailéan seems to have died at some point before 1296. That year, Edward I, King of England invaded and conquered Scotland. One of the Scottish king's most ardent supporters had been Alasdair Mac Dubhghaill, a fact which appears to have led Edward I to use the former's chief rival, Alasdair Óg Mac Domhnaill, Lord of Islay, as his principal agent in the maritime west. In this capacity, this Clann Domhnaill chief attempted to contain the Clann Dubhghaill revolt against English authority.

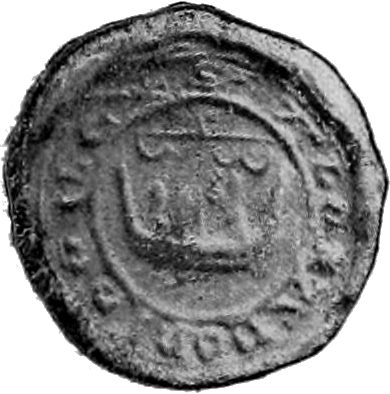
The seal of Alasdair Óg Mac Domhnaill, a Clann Somhairle opponent of Lachlann and Ruaidhrí.

The struggle between the two Clann Somhairle namesakes seems to be documented in two undated letters from Alasdair Óg to Edward I. Whilst the first reveals that Clann Ruaidhrí warred against Clann Domhnaill with Clann Dubhghaill, the latter letter corroborates this alignment and violence, and also evinces cooperation with the Comyn kindred as well. These dispatches seem to reveal that Lachlann and Ruaidhrí were focused upon seizing control of Skye and Lewis and Harris from the absentee Earl of Ross, a man who endured imprisonment in England from 1296 to 1303. The bitter strife between Clann Ruaidhrí and Clann Domhnaill depicted by these letters seems to indicate that both kindreds sought to capitalise on the earl's absence, and that both sought to incorporate the islands into their own lordships. In specific regard to Clann Ruaidhrí, it is likely that their campaigning was an extension of the conflict originating from the creation of the shrievalty of Ross in 1293.

There is further evidence of Clann Ruaidhrí cooperation with the Comyns in the years 1299 and 1304. Two years later, Robert Bruce VII, Earl of Carrick, a claimant to the Scottish throne, killed his chief rival to the kingship, John Comyn of Badenoch. Although the former seized the throne (as Robert I) by March, the English Crown immediately struck back, defeating his forces in June. By September, Robert I was a fugitive, and appears to have escaped into the Hebrides. According to a fourteenth-century chronicle, Ailéan's daughter, Cairistíona, played an instrumental part in Robert I's survival at this low point in his career, sheltering him along Scotland's western seaboard. (Note: It was the generation of Ailéan's children—the second generation in descent from Ruaidhrí mac Raghnaill—that members of Clann Ruaidhrí are first identified with a family name derived from this eponymous ancestor. (Note: For example, in one particular piece of correspondence Lachlann is called "Laclan Magrogri". Lachlann's brother, Ruaidhrí, may be identical to a certain "Mac Ruaidhri, ri Innsi Gall" noted by the fifteenth- to sixteenth-century Annals of Ulster in 1318.) Such surnames also appear after two generations for Clann Domhnaill, and three for Clann Dubhghaill.)

=== Ruaidhrí Mac Ruaidhrí, and Cairistíona Nic Ruaidhrí ===
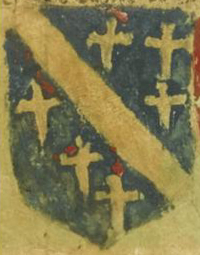
The arms of the Earl of Mar depicted in Balliol roll.

Lachlann disappears from record in the second decade of the century, and seems to have been succeeded by his brother, Ruaidhrí. Although Cairistíona was Ailéan's sole legitimate offspring, it is unlikely that members of Clann Ruaidhrí would have regarded legitimate birth as the sole qualification of succession. In fact, as the leading male member of Clann Ruaidhrí, it is probable that Ruaidhrí himself possessed control of the kindred's wide-ranging territories. Nevertheless, Ruaidhrí seems to have only gained formal recognition of his rights to the lordship after Cairistíona's resignation of her own claims.

There is reason to suspect that Cairistíona's stake in the lordship posed a potential threat to Ruaidhrí and his descendants. Certainly she was married to a member of the comital family of Mar, a kindred that was in turn related in marriage to Robert I and his family. Furthermore, Cairistíona and her husband had a son, Ruaidhrí, who potentially could have sought royal assistance in pursuance of his mother's claims. The name Cairistíona bestowed upon this son could indicate that he was not only named after his maternal grandfather, but that he was regarded as a potential successor to the Clann Ruaidhrí lordship. Cairistíona resigned her claims with the condition that, if her brother died without a male heir, her like-named son would secure the inheritance.

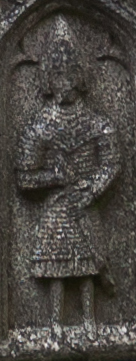
A fifteenth-century sculpted figure of a gallowglass, depicted upon the apparent effigy of Feidhlimidh Ó Conchobhair, father of Dubhghall's son-in-law, Aodh na nGall.

On one hand, it is possible that the king orchestrated Ruaidhrí's succession to the lordship as a means of securing support from one of the most powerful families on the western coast. On the other hand, the fact that Cairistíona—a close personal ally of Robert I—had been superseded by Ruaidhrí—a man with a comparatively chequered career—could indicate that the latter's consolidation of control was instead the result of internal family politics. Whatever the case, Ruaidhrí was likely already regarded as the rightful chief, and the charter itself undeniably brought him under feudal dependence of the Scottish Crown. Ruaidhrí's provincial lordship encompassed the mainland territories of Moidart, Arisaig, Morar, and Knoydart; and the island territories of Rhum, Eigg, Barra, St Kilda, and Uist. This dominion, like the great lordships of Annandale and Galloway, was comparable to any of the kingdom's thirteen earldoms.

There is evidence to suggest that Ruaidhrí assisted the Scottish Crown in its campaigning against the English in Ireland, and that he lost his life in the crushing Scottish defeat at the Battle of Faughart in 1318. According to the sixteenth-century Annals of Loch Cé, a certain "Mac Ruaidhri ri Innsi Gall" and a "Mac Domnaill, ri Oirir Gaidheal" were slain in the onslaught. This source is mirrored by several other Irish annals including the fifteenth- to sixteenth-century Annals of Connacht, the seventeenth-century Annals of the Four Masters, the fifteenth- to sixteenth-century Annals of Ulster, and the seventeenth-century Annals of Clonmacnoise. (Note: The Annals of Clonmacnoise exists only in an early modern translation and gives: "mcRory king of the islands and mcDonnell prince of the Irish of Scotland".) The precise identities of the men named by such sources are unknown for certain, although they seem to have been the heads of Clann Ruaidhrí and Clann Domhnaill, and the former man may well have been Ruaidhrí himself.

Another major engagement that featured Clann Ruaidhrí was the final defeat of Ruaidhrí Ó Conchobair, King of Connacht at the hands of Feidhlimidh Ó Conchobair, when a certain Donnchadh Mac Ruaidhrí and one hundred gallowglasses fell with the king. One set of annals describes the fallen gallowglasses as "noble". The following year, in 1317, Clann Ruaidhrí was a participant in another crushing defeat, when the forces of Connacht vanquished those of Bréifne. According to one set of annals, seven score gallowglasses of a certain "Mac Ruaidri" were slain in the encounter.

=== Raghnall Mac Ruaidhrí, and Cairistíona Nic Ruaidhrí ===
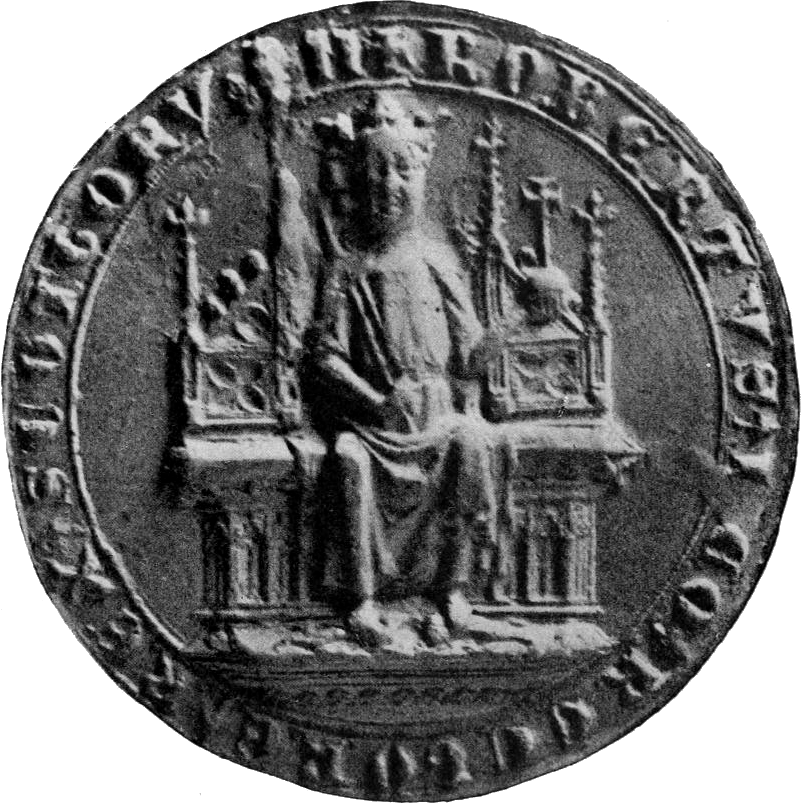
The seal of Robert I. According to a fourteenth-century chronicle, Cairistíona Nic Ruaidhrí was instrumental in the survival of the king early in his reign.

Although Ruaidhrí seems to have ensured the continuation of his kindred by formally coming to terms with Robert I and campaigning in Ireland with the latter's brother, there is evidence indicating that the Clann Ruaidhrí inheritance was contested by Cairistíona after his demise. Ruaidhrí was survived by a daughter, Áine, and an illegitimate son, Raghnall. The latter may well have been under age at the time of Ruaidhrí's death, and it is apparent that Cairistíona and her confederates attempted to seize control of the inheritance. Although Cairistíona is recorded to have resigned her claimed rights to a certain Artúr Caimbéal after Ruaidhrí's death, it is clear that Raghnall eventually succeeded in securing the region, and was regarded as the chief of Clann Ruaidhrí by most of his kin.

In 1325, a certain "Roderici de Ylay" suffered the forfeiture of his possessions by Robert I. It is possible that this record refers to a member of Clann Ruaidhrí, and that it demonstrates the contrast of relations between Clann Ruaidhrí and the Scottish Crown in the 1320s and 1330s. If correct, the man in question may be identical to Raghnall himself, which could indicate that his forfeiture was related to Cairistíona's attempt to alienate the Clann Ruaidhrí estate from him and transfer it into the clutches of the Caimbéalaigh kindred (the Campbells). Another possibility is that the forfeiture was instead ratified in response to undesirable Clann Ruaidhrí expansion into certain neighbouring regions, such as the former territories of the disinherited Clann Dubhghaill.

Although Cairistíona's resignation charter to Artúr is undated, it could date to just before the forfeiture. The list of witnesses who attested this grant is remarkable, and may reveal that the charter had royal approval. These men all seem to have been close adherents of Robert I against Clann Dubhghaill, and all represented families of power along the western seaboard. An alliance of such men may well have been an intimidating prospect to the Clann Ruaidhrí leadership. In fact, the forfeiture could have been personally reinforced by Robert I, as the king seems to have travelled to Tarbert Castle—a royal stronghold in Kintyre—within the same year.

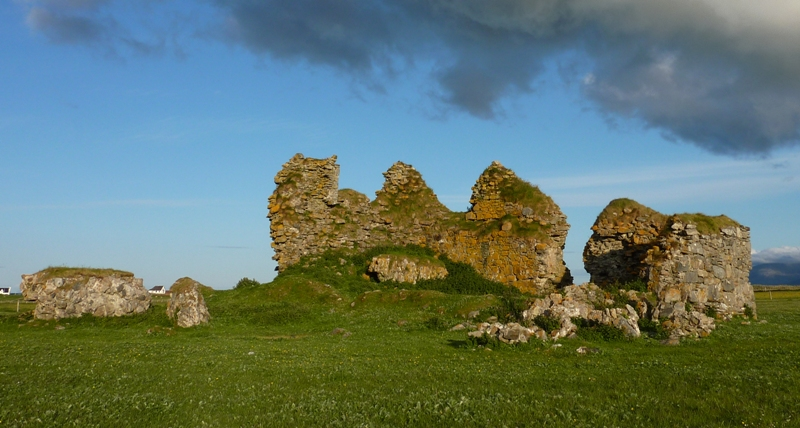
According to early modern tradition, now-ruinous Borve Castle was constructed by Áine Nic Ruaidhrí. According to the fourteenth-century chronicle, it was one of the principal fortresses along the western seaboard.

Unlike the First War of Scottish Independence, in which Clann Ruaidhrí participated, Raghnall and his family are not known to have taken part in the second war (from 1332 to 1341). In fact, Raghnall certainly appears on record by 1337, when he aided his third cousin, Eóin Mac Domhnaill I, Lord of the Isles, in the latter's efforts to receive a papal dispensation to marry Raghnall's sister, Áine, in 1337. At the time, Raghnall and Eóin were apparently supporters of Edward Balliol, a claimant to the Scottish throne who held power in the realm from 1332 to 1336. By June 1343, however, both Raghnall and Eóin were reconciled with Edward's rival, the reigning son of Robert I, David II, King of Scotland, and Raghnall himself was confirmed in the Clann Ruaidhrí lordship by the king.

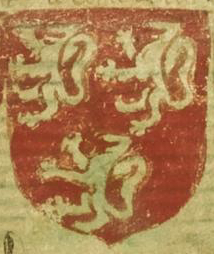
The arms of the Earl of Ross depicted in Balliol Roll.

At about this time, Raghnall received the rights to Kintail from William III, Earl of Ross, a transaction which was confirmed by the king that July. There is reason to suspect that the king's recognition of this grant may have been intended as a regional counterbalance of sorts, since he also diverted the rights to Skye from Eóin to William III. It is also possible that Clann Ruaidhrí power had expanded into the coastal region of Kintail at some point after the death of William III's father in 1333, during a period when William III may have been either a minor or exiled from the country. Whatever the case, the earl seems to have had little choice but to relinquish his rights to Kintail to Raghnall.

Bitterness between these two magnates appears to be evidenced in dramatic fashion by the assassination of Raghnall and several of his followers at the hands of the earl and his adherents. Raghnall's murder, at Elcho Priory in October 1346, is attested by several non-contemporaneous sources. At the time of his demise, Raghnall had been obeying the king's muster at Perth, in preparation for the Scots' imminent invasion of England. Following the deed, William III deserted the royal host, and fled to the safety of his domain. Although he was later to pay dearly for this act of disloyalty, the episode itself evidences the earl's determination to deal with the threat of encroachment of Clann Ruaidhrí power into what he regarded as his own domain. Despite this dramatic removal of William III's main rival, the most immediate beneficiary of the killing was Eóin, a man who was also William III's brother-in-law.

=== Diminishment ===
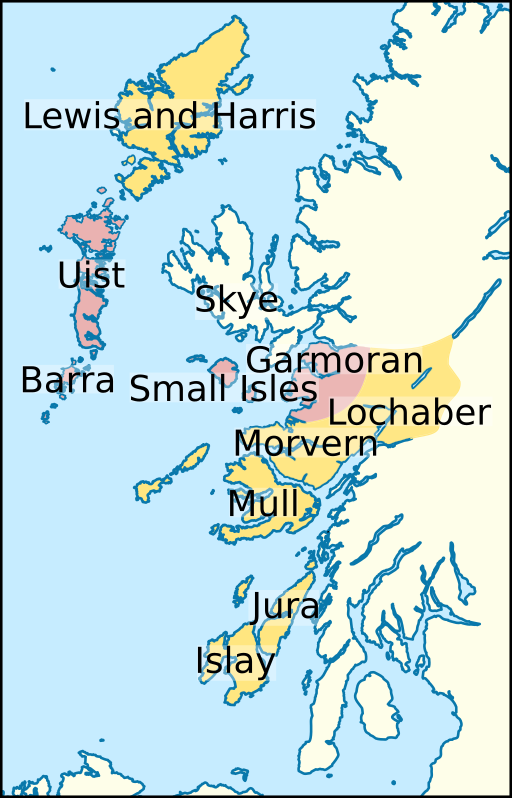
Clann Ruaidhrí territories (red) consumed by Clann Domhnaill following the assassination of Raghnall Mac Ruaidhrí in 1346.

Following Raghnall's death, control of the Clann Ruaidhrí estate passed to Eóin by right of Áine. Although the latter appears to have been either dead or divorced from Eóin by 1350, the Clann Ruaidhrí territories evidently remained in Clann Domhnaill possession after Eóin's subsequent marriage to Margaret, daughter of Robert Stewart, Steward of Scotland. David himself died in 1371, and was succeeded by his uncle, Robert Stewart (as Robert II). In 1372, the recently crowned king confirmed Eóin's rights to the former Clann Ruaidhrí territories. The year after that, Robert II confirmed Eóin's grant of these lands to Raghnall Mac Domhnaill—Eóin and Áine's eldest surviving son—a man apparently named after Raghnall himself. Raghnall Mac Domhnaill went on to become the eponymous ancestor of the Clann Raghnaill branch of Clann Domhnaill.

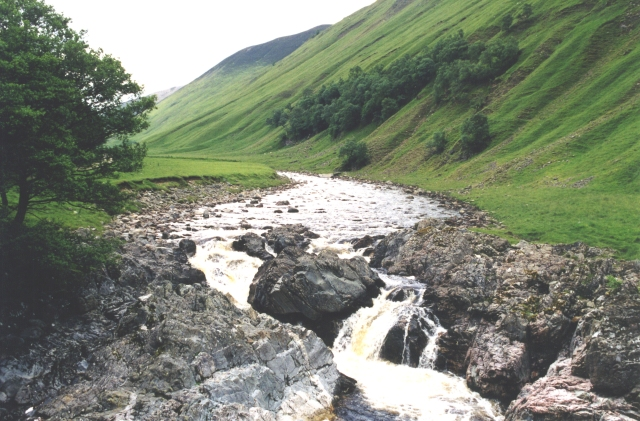
A view down the spine of Glen Tilt, a region that appears to have been granted to a member of Clann Ruaidhrí.

Although severely diminished, there is evidence indicating that Clann Ruaidhrí continued on for several generations. Members of the family were noted gallowglasses in Ireland at about this time. One such man, the gallowglass commander of Toirdhealbhach Ó Conchobhair, King of Connacht was notably slain in 1342. The annal-entries noting this man are the last sources to specifically note Clann Ruaidhrí gallowglasses in Ireland. (Note: The slain man may well be identical to the "Gregorius McRyry" who appears on record in 1328 as a member of rúta of Maurice FitzGerald, Lord of Desmond. The Irish term rúta ("routes") refers to companies of recruited mercenaries.) Nevertheless, there is reason to suspect that a certain Eóghan—granted the thanage of Glen Tilt by Robert Stewart at some point before 1346—was an Irish-based brother of Raghnall and Áine, brought back to Scotland to serve the military forces of the expanding Steward. As in Scotland, it seems that the Clann Ruaidhrí ruling line dwindled and faded away in Ireland in the fourteenth century. Even so, the fact that the family continued into later centuries appears to be evidenced by the fifteenth-century executions of Alasdair Mac Ruaidhrí and Eóin Mac Artair, chieftains said to have commanded one thousand men apiece. The attempt by Cairistíona to divert the Clann Ruaidhrí lordship into the hands of Artúr Caimbéal, almost a century before, could indicate that Alasdair Mac Ruaidhrí and Eóin Mac Artair had continued a feud that stemmed from Cairistíona's contested inheritance and her connections with the Caimbéalaigh.

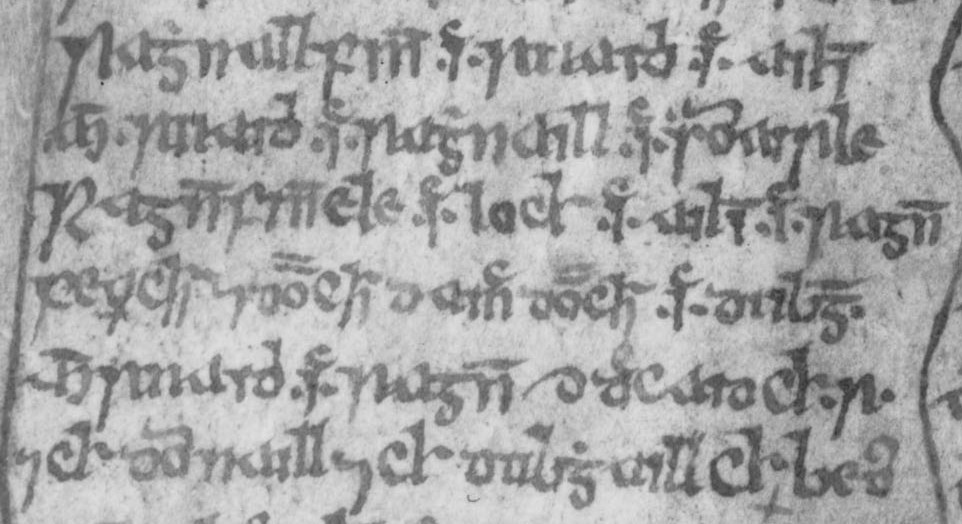
An excerpt from National Library of Scotland Advocates' 72.1.1 (MS 1467) showing Clann Ruaidhrí pedigrees.

Another family that may have benefited from connections from Clann Ruaidhrí was Clann Néill of Barra. In 1427, Giolla Adhamhnáin Mac Néill is recorded to have been granted Barra and Boisdale from Alasdair Mac Domhnaill, Lord of the Isles. Giolla Adhamhnáin's father was Ruaidhrí Mac Néill, a man who appears on record (without a territorial designation) in 1409. The fact that Ruaidhrí Mac Néill seems to be the first member of Clann Néill to have borne a name alluding to Clann Ruaidhrí, coupled with the fact that Giolla Adhamhnáin is known to have held Barra and Boisdale—insular territories formerly controlled by Clann Ruaidhrí—could indicate that Clann Néill's right to these lands came through a line of descent from a Clann Ruaidhrí heiress. On one hand, this could indicate that Ruaidhrí Mac Néill's father, Murchadh Mac Néill, had married a daughter of Raghnall. On the other hand, Giolla Adhamhnáin's charter appears to indicate that the estates passed into the possession of his family by way of its descent from his maternal grandmother, a woman who could have been an heiress of Clann Ruaidhrí. Another possibility is that Clann Néill's stake in the region specifically rested upon a marital alliance with Clann Domhnaill. In fact, the seventeenth-century Sleat History claims that Clann Néill gained Boisdale from Áine's son, Gofraidh Mac Domhnaill.
