= Gallogly =

Gallogly is an Irish surname anglicised from Mac an Ghallóglaigh meaning "son of the gallowglass". Notable people with the surname include:

- Charlie Gallogly (1919–1993), Irish footballer
- Edward P. Gallogly (1919–1995), American politician
- James L. Gallogly (born 1952), American university administrator and businessman
- Mark Gallogly (born 1957), American businessman

== See also ==
- Elton Gallegly (born 1944), American politician
