= Dubhghall mac Ruaidhrí =

- King of Argyll and the Isles Scotland
- Dubhghall's name and title ("King of Argyll") Scotland as it appears on folio 19v of Royal Irish Academy C iii 1 (the Annals of Connacht).
- Died: 1268 possibly Norway
- Issue: Eiríkr; Donnchadh; Jartrud (Gjertrude)
- House: Clann Ruaidhrí (Clann Somhairle)
- Father: Ruaidhrí mac Raghnaill

Dubhghall mac Ruaidhrí (died 1268) was a leading figure in the thirteenth-century Kingdom of the Isles, on the West Coast of Scotland. (Note: Since the 1980s, academics have accorded Dubhghall various personal names in English secondary sources: Dougal MacRory, Dougall MacRuari, Dubgall mac Ruaídrí, Dubgall mac Ruaidrí, Dubgall Mac Ruaidrí, Dubgall mac Ruarídh, Dubgall Mac Sumarlaide, Dubgall MacRuaídrí, Dubhgall mac Ruaidhrí, Dubhgall Mac Somhairle, Dubhgall Macruaidhri, Dubhgall MacRuaidhri, Dubhgall MacSomhairle, Dubhghall mac Ruaidhri mhic Raghnaill mhic Shomhairle, Dubhghall mac Ruaidhrí mhic Raghnaill, Dubhghall mac Ruaidhrí, Dubhghall mac Ruaidhri, Dubhghall MacRory, Dubhghall MacSorley, Dugald mac Roderick, Dugald Mac Ruairi, Dugald mac Ruairi, Dugald mac Ruari, Dugald Mac Sorley, Dugald MacRuairi, Dugald Macruari, Dugall mac Ruari, Dugall macRuari, Duggal Rudrisson, Duggáll mac Ruaidhrí, Mac Sorley, and Mac Sumarlaide.) He was a son of Ruaidhrí mac Raghnaill, and thus a member of Clann Ruaidhrí. Dubhgall was the last Gaelic King of Mann.

Dubhghall was also active in Ireland, and is recorded to have conducted military operations against the English in Connacht. In 1259, the year after his victory over the English Sheriff of Connacht, Dubhghall's daughter was married to Aodh na nGall Ó Conchobhair, son of the reigning King of Connacht. This woman's tocher consisted of a host of gallowglass warriors commanded by Dubhghall's brother, Ailéan. This record appears to be the earliest notice of such soldiers in surviving sources. The epithet borne by Dubhghall's son-in-law—na nGall—can be taken to mean "of the Hebrideans", and appears to refer to the Hebridean military support that contributed to his success against the English.

The careers of Dubhghall and his Clann Somhairle kinsman, Eóghan Mac Dubhghaill, exemplify the difficulties faced by the leading Norse-Gaelic lords in the Isles and along western seaboard of Scotland. In theory, these regions formed part of the greater Norwegian commonwealth. However, during the tenures of Dubhghall and Eóghan, successive thirteenth-century Scottish kings succeeded in extending their own authority into these Norse-Gaelic regions. Whilst Eóghan eventually submitted to the Scots, Dubhghall steadfastly supported the Norwegian cause. Recognised as a king by the reigning Hákon Hákonarson, King of Norway, Dubhghall was one of the leading figures in the failed 1263 campaign against the Scots. Although Dubhghall is last recorded resisting the encroachment of Scottish overlordship, the Scots succeeded in wrenching control of the Isles from the Norwegians in 1266. Dubhghall may have died in exile in Norway, where his son, Eiríkr, was an active baron.

== Clann Ruaidhrí ==
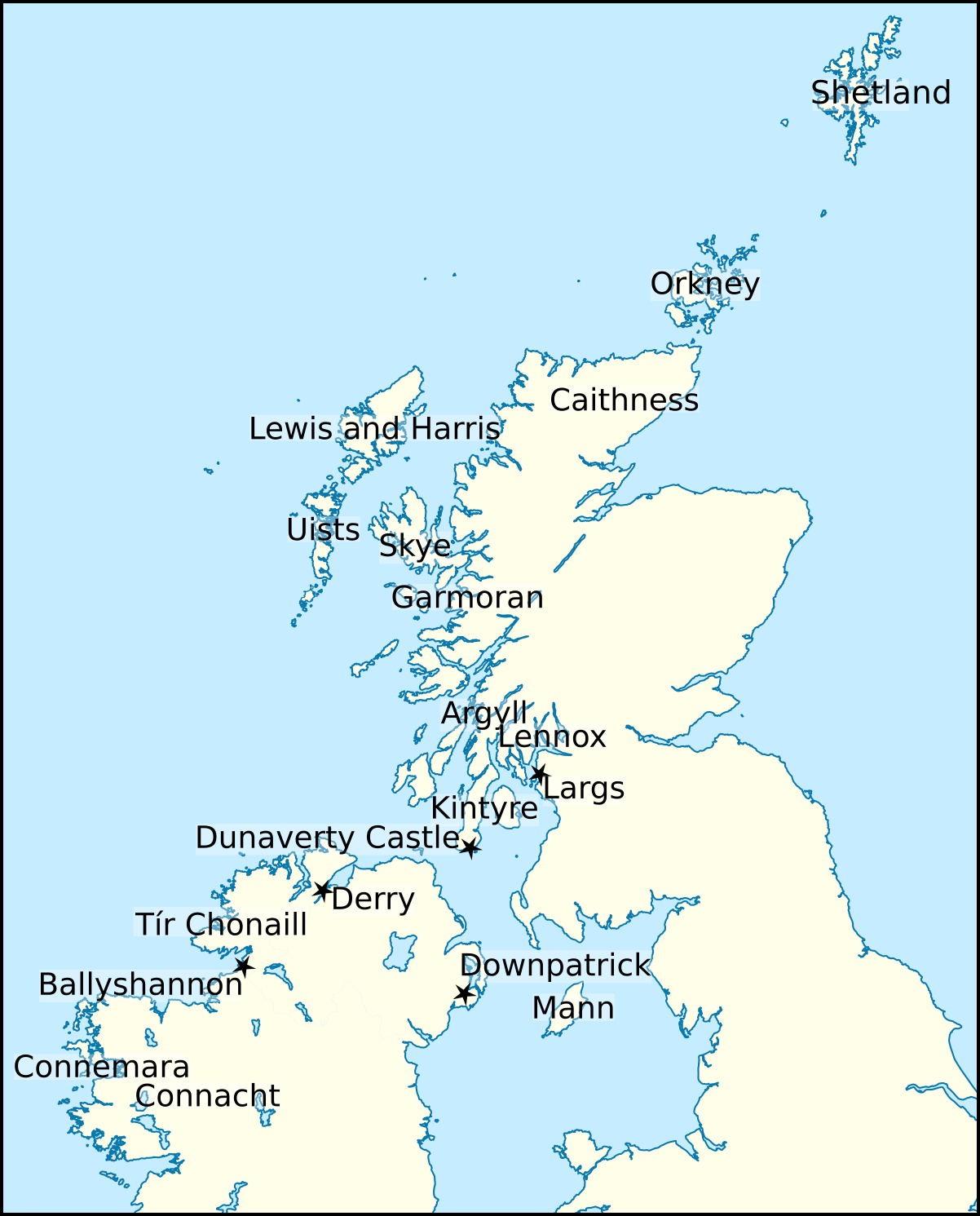
Locations relating the life and times of Dubhghall.

Dubhghall was a son of Ruaidhrí mac Raghnaill, Lord of Kintyre in Scotland, the eponym of Clann Ruaidhrí, a branch of Clann Somhairle. By the second decade of the thirteenth century, Ruaidhrí may have been the leading member of Clann Somhairle.

The little that is known of Dubhghall's father suggests that, much like Dubhghall himself, Ruaidhrí operated against the looming threat of Scottish overlordship of Argyll and the Isles. Although Ruaidhrí appears to have originally held power in Kintyre, the Scottish Crown seems to have expelled him from the region in the 1220s. In Ruaidhrí's place, Alexander II, King of Scotland appears to have planted Ruaidhrí's younger brother, Domhnall, an apparently more palatable candidate from the Scots' perspective. This dramatic projection of Scottish royal authority may have also resulted in the king's establishment of the Clann Dubhghaill lordship of Argyll which appears on record not long afterwards. By the midpoint of the thirteenth century, Clann Dubhghaill—yet another branch of Clann Somhairle—was represented by Eóghan Mac Dubhghaill, whilst Dubhghall himself represented Clann Ruaidhrí.

Dubhghall's name as it appears on folio 114v of AM 45 fol (Codex Frisianus): "Dvggal son Ruðra".

Although it is possible that Dubhghall's power base was located in Garmoran and perhaps the Uists, there is uncertainty as to how and when these territories entered into the possession of his family. Later leading members of Clann Ruaidhrí certainly possessed these lands, but evidence of custody before the mid thirteenth century is lacking. In theory, these territories could have been awarded to the kindred following the Scots' acquisition of the Isles in 1266. On the other hand, the family's position in the Isles may have stemmed from its marital alliance with the Crovan dynasty, an affiliation undertaken at some point before Ruaidhrí's apparent expulsion from Kintyre. (Note: It is also possible that the mainland territories of Clann Ruaidhrí were lands earlier possessed by Somhairle mac Giolla Brighde, common ancestor of Clann Somhairle, and that the island territories passed from the Crovan dynasty to Clann Somhairle by way of Somhairle's wife, Ragnhildr Óláfsdóttir.)

== Alignment with the Norwegian Crown ==
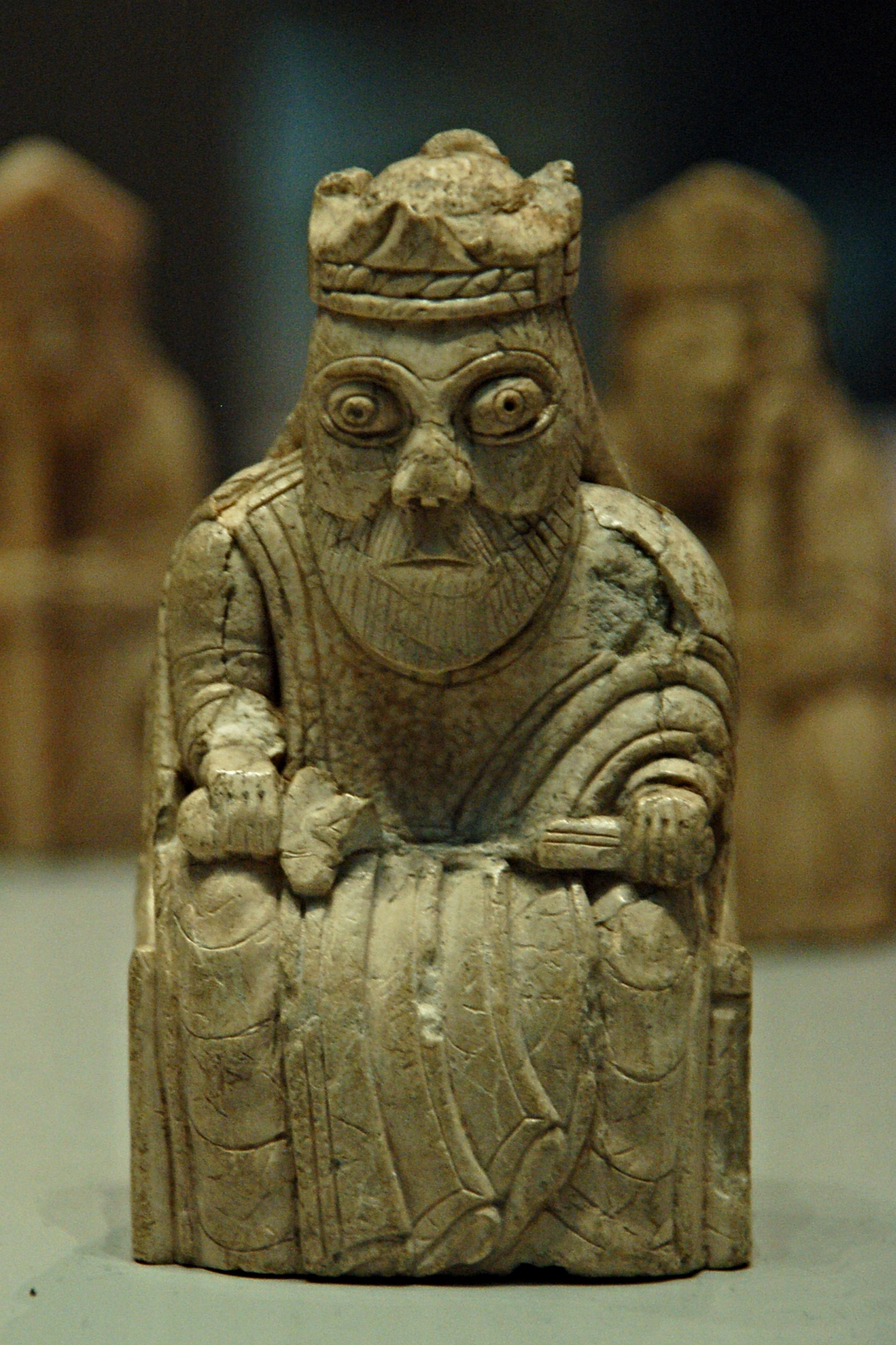
One of the king gaming pieces of the so-called Lewis chessmen. Comprising some four sets, the pieces are thought to have been crafted in Norway in the twelfth- and thirteenth centuries. They were uncovered in Lewis in the early nineteenth century.

In 1248, both Dubhghall and Eóghan are stated by the thirteenth-century Hákonar saga Hákonarsonar to have arrived in Norway, with both men seeking the kingship of the northern Suðreyjar from Hákon Hákonarson, King of Norway. The entirety of the Suðreyjar—an Old Norse term meaning "Southern Islands"—roughly equates to the Hebrides and Mann. The precise jurisdiction that Dubhghall and Eóghan competed for is uncertain. For example, the northern Hebridean islands of Lewis and Harris and Skye appear to have been held by the Crovan dynasty, then represented by the reigning Haraldr Óláfsson, King of Mann and the Isles. In about 1241, the dominion of the latter appears to have been defined by Hákon as the islands which had been previously ruled by Haraldr's father, uncle, and grandfather. Hákon, therefore, appears to have not only deliberately excluded the island territories ruled by Clann Somhairle, but limited the possibility of Haraldr becoming drawn into alignment with Scottish interests as some leading members of Clann Somhairle had been. Eóghan and Dubhghall, therefore, may have contended for all the islands excluded from Haraldr's allotment. It is conceivable that Eóghan and Dubhghall sought kingship of the same jurisdiction that Hákon had awarded to Óspakr-Hákon about a decade before—a region which could have included some or all of the islands possessed by Clann Somhairle. (Note: Óspakr appears to have been another member of Clann Somhairle, perhaps the Clann Dubhghaill branch, and thus a close kinsman of Eóghan himself.)

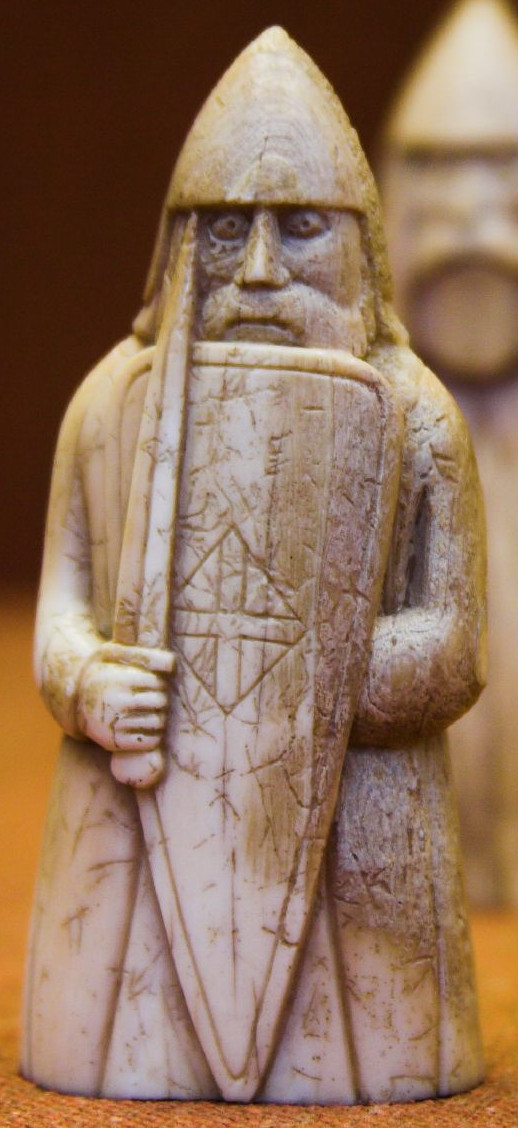
One of the rook gaming pieces of the Lewis chessmen. The Scandinavian connections of leading members of the Isles may have been reflected in their military armament, and could have resembled that depicted upon such gaming pieces.

Although 1247 was also the year of Hákon's royal coronation, and it is possible that the arrival of the Clann Somhairle dynasts was a result of the reimposition of Norwegian overlordship in the Isles, another reason for their arrival may relate to the death of a certain Mac Somhairle, an apparent member of Clann Somhairle, slain whilst resisting an English invasion of Tír Chonaill in 1247. Merely a year before, Haraldr seems to have submitted to Henry III, King of England, and it is possible that Hákon had consequently recognised Mac Somhairle's kingship in the Isles in retaliation to Haraldr's acceptance of English overtures. If so, Dubhghall and Eóghan may have both sought to succeed their kinsman in the Isles. In fact, Dubhghall's father may well be identical to Mac Somhairle. Certainly, Dubhghall's presence in Norway suggests that Ruaidhrí was indeed dead by this date. (Note: Another candidate for the slain Mac Somhairle includes Ruaidhrí's younger brother, Domhnall (eponym of the Clann Domhnaill branch of Clann Somhairle), although there appears to be evidence that this figure lived into the later part of the century. Eóghan's father, Donnchadh mac Dubhghaill, is another candidate, but the fact that this man was active in 1175—over seventy years before Mac Somhairle's demise—could be evidence against this. So too may be the fact that Eóghan is recorded to have granted property to the Diocese of Argyll in 1240, which could be evidence that Donnchadh was dead by this date. Another Clann Dubhghaill candidate is Donnchadh's younger brother, Dubhghall.)

An alliance with a ruler of the Isles would have certainly benefited Henry's ongoing military operations in Ireland, and it is possible that it was Haraldr's pact with him that had prompted Mac Somhairle's involvement against the English in Ireland. In fact, Clann Somhairle may have faced immediate repercussions for their alignment with the Norwegian Crown. For example, English financial records for 1248 reveal that Walter Bisset was tasked to fortify a castle along the Scottish coast. This castle appears to have been that of Dunaverty, seated upon the southern coast of Kintyre, which could indicate that Walter's Ulster-based actions in Kintyre were undertaken as a means to divide the Isles, isolating Mann from the Hebrides.

== Repercussions from the Scottish Crown ==
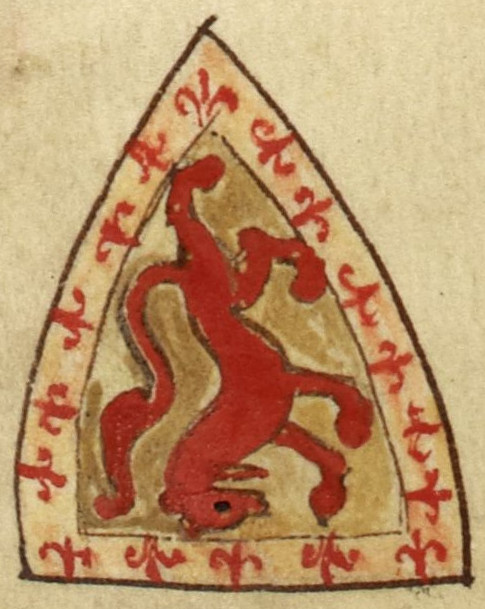
Coat of arms of Alexander II as it appears on folio 146v of British Library Royal 14 C VII (Historia Anglorum). The inverted shield represents the king's death in 1249.

Whilst Dubhghall and Eóghan were in Norway, Hákon appears to have attempted to bring Haraldr back onside; and in so doing, Hákon gave away his widowed daughter in marriage to Haraldr. Unfortunately for Hákon and his designs in the Isles, the newly wedded couple were lost at sea whilst sailing from Norway to the Isles. Not only did this calamity deprive the Islesmen of a capable king, but it cost the Norwegian Crown a closely connected advocate in the region. Upon learning of the catastrophe, Hákon immediately sent Eóghan west-over-sea to temporarily take up the kingship of the Isles on his behalf. The fact that the thirteenth- to fourteenth-century Chronicle of Mann reports that Haraldr's brother, Rǫgnvaldr, succeeded to the kingship in 1249, could indicate that Rǫgnvaldr and Eóghan shared a degree of authority in the Isles. In any event, Eóghan was not only a Norwegian dependant in the Isles, but an eminent Scottish magnate on the mainland. Although the Scottish Crown appears to have attempted to purchase the Isles earlier that decade, Alexander II launched an invasion of Argyll, in the summer of 1249, directed at the very heart of the Clann Dubhghaill lordship. The apparent cooling of relations between Eóghan and Alexander II, along with Haraldr's demise, the resultant kin-strife over Haraldr's succession, and Eóghan's acceptance of royal powers on Hákon's behalf, could all have spurred the Scots' offensive. In the course of this offensive, Alexander II demanded that Eóghan renounce his allegiance to Hákon, and ordered him to hand over certain mainland and island fortresses. Eóghan stubbornly refused, and the unfolding crisis only ended with the Scottish king's untimely death in July 1249.

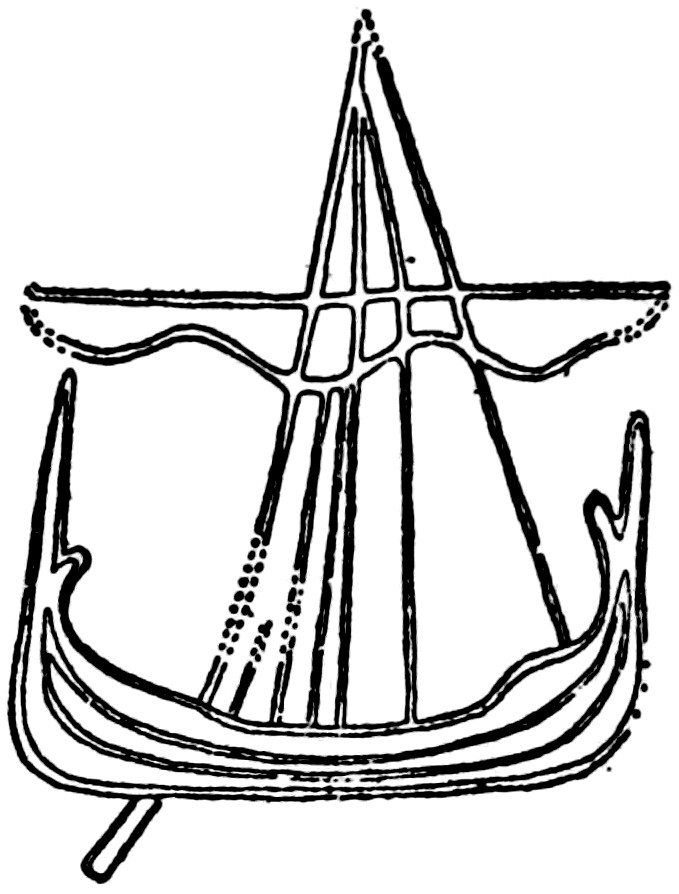
Detail from Maughold IV, a Manx runestone displaying a contemporary sailing vessel. The power of the kings of the Isles laid in their armed galley-fleets.

Eóghan dearly suffered as a result of conflicting obligations the Norwegians and Scots. In fact, it is probable that he had been utterly dispossessed by the Scots a result of their invasion. Although the reasons why Hákon originally awarded him the kingship over Dubhghall are unknown; for whatever reason, the latter appears to have been regarded as a less preferable candidate at the time. Eóghan's apparent displacement at the hands of Alexander II, however, could well have upended the hierarchy of Clann Somhairle. For instance, a particular entry preserved by the Icelandic annals states that, within the very year that Eóghan was forced from Argyll by the Scots, Dubhghall himself "took kingship" in the Isles. This record could reveal that Dubhghall and Eóghan shared kingship in the Hebrides, or that Dubhghall assumed the kingship from a severely weakened Eóghan. In fact, Eóghan's actions of the following year—when he and Magnús Óláfsson, a member of the Crovan dynasty, unsuccessfully attempted to seized control of Mann—could further indicate he was in dire straits.

Magnús, Dubhghall, and Eóghan were back in Scandinavia in 1253, as Hákonar saga Hákonarsonar reveals that the latter two took part in the Norwegians' royal campaign against the Danish Crown. By 1255, however, Eóghan was reconciled with the Scottish Crown. The fact that Dubhghall was later regarded as king in Scandinavian sources could indicate that Hákon's original award of the title to Eóghan in 1248 was reversed upon the restoration of Eóghan's Scottish lordship. However, the record of Dubhghall holding kingship as early as 1249, coupled with Eóghan's attempt to gain control of Mann in 1250, and the fact that both men were identified as kings whilst campaigning with the Norwegians royal forces in 1253, could indicate that Hákon had originally intended for both men to hold kingship, possibly with Dubhghall in the Hebrides and Eóghan on Mann. (Note: Whilst Hákonar saga Hákonarsonar identifies both men as kings, and locates Eóghan's kingship in the Suðreyjar, it does not specify the territorial extent of Dubhghall's.)

== Involvement in Ireland ==
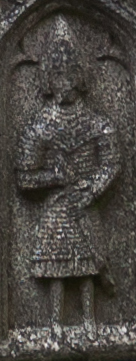
Fifteenth-century sculpted figure of a gallowglass, as depicted upon the apparent effigy of Feidhlimidh Ó Conchobhair, father of Dubhghall's son-in-law, Aodh na nGall.

In 1258, the fifteenth- to sixteenth-century Annals of Connacht, the sixteenth-century Annals of Loch Cé, and the seventeenth-century Annals of the Four Masters indicate that Dubhghall, at the command of a formidable fleet, sailed to Connemara on the western Irish coast, where he is stated to have robbed a merchant ship. No doubt as a result of this spoliation, the sources further reveal that Jordan d'Exeter, the English Sheriff of Connacht, pursued Dubhghall's fleet and was slain along with many of his men in the culminating clash. Enriched with plunder, Dubhghall is then stated to have returned home from this piratical cruise. The next entry preserved by the Annals of Connacht concerns an extraordinary assembly of Aodh na nGall Ó Conchobhair, Tadhg Ó Briain, and Brian Ó Néill, King of Tír Eoghain, within the year. It was at this convention, at Caol Uisce on the River Erne, that Aodh—son of the King of Connacht—and Tadhg—son of the King of Thomond—relinquished their claims to the high-kingship of Ireland in favour of Brian, who was then proclaimed high king. The latter was then in midst of campaigning against a temporarily weakened English Earldom of Ulster, and closely allied with Aodh in his cause.

The following year, Dubhghall again appears on record in Irish affairs, as the Annals of Connacht, the Annals of Loch Cé, and the Annals of the Four Masters reveal that Aodh travelled to Derry and married a daughter of Dubhghall, and thereby received a tocher that included one hundred and sixty gallowglass warriors commanded by Dubhghall's brother, Ailéan. (Note: This tocher seems to be similar to that attributed to the bride of Dubhghall's later kinsman, Aonghus Óg Mac Domhnaill. According to Hebridean tradition preserved by the eighteenth-century Book of Clanranald and the seventeenth-century Sleat History, the latter's bride, Áine Ní Chatháin, was accompanied to her husband by a remarkable retinue of Irishmen. The first recorded instance of the term "gallowglass" (gallóglach) concerns events dated 1290. Although the sources documenting the marriage of Dubhghall's daughter do not specifically identify the warriors as gallowglasses, they are in fact called óglaigh, a term that seems to refer to gallowglasses in this particular instance. In fact, the 1247 notice of Mac Somhairle's death in battle may well be evidence that this man also led gallowglasses.) The marital alliance between Aodh and Dubhghall was conducted at the main port within Brian's realm, a site indicating that the union—along with the assembly and naval operations of the previous year—was part of a carefully coordinated plan to tackle English power in the north west of Ireland.

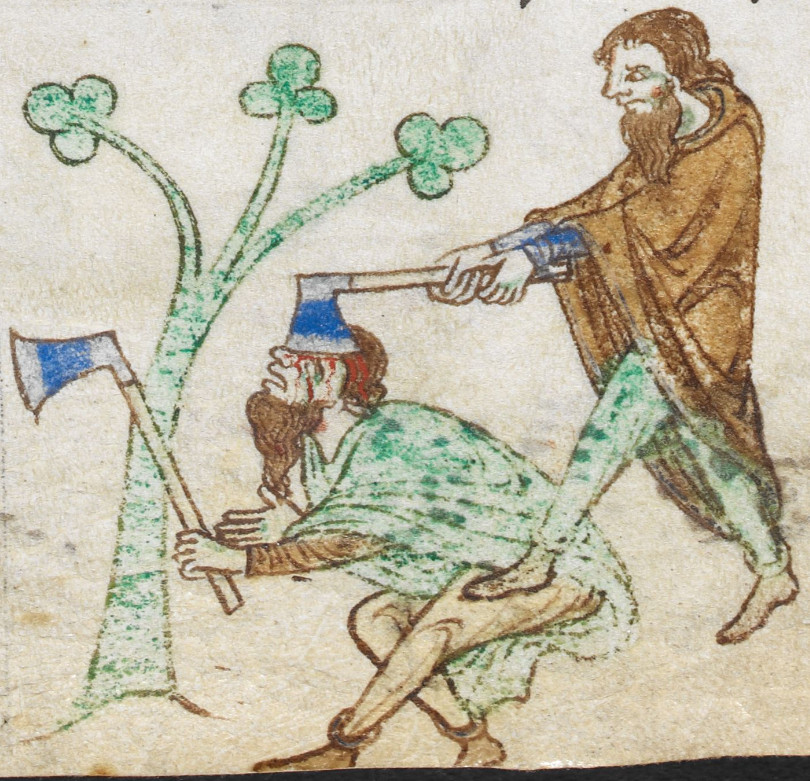
Armed Irishmen depicted on folio 28r of British Library Royal 13 B VIII (Topographia Hibernica). (Note: According to Hákonar saga Hákonarsonar, the Scottish footsoldiers that clashed with Hákon's troops at Largs in 1263 were mainly armed with bows and "Irish axes". The latter two-handed weapons were likely of Scandinavian origin. They were apparently favoured by the Norse-Gaelic warriors as well, and used by latter gallowglass warriors.)

Unfortunately for these confederates, Tadhg was dead by 1259, and the combined forces of Aodh and Brian were utterly crushed in battle at Downpatrick in 1260, with Brian amongst the slain. Despite this catastrophe, the phenomenon of eminent Irish lords importing heavily armed mercenaries from the Isles and western Scotland became more prevalent in the later part of the century, and helped to even the military superiority enjoyed by English forces over native Irish troops. (Note: Generally, English knights were superior to the comparatively lightly armed Irish horsemen. Gallowglass warriors fought in formations fashioned to counteract the devastating charge of such knights. The Clann Ruaidhrí tocher of gallowglasses may well have fought at the battle at Downpatrick, although the fact that Brian's forces were defeated by local English levies lends little evidence to their capabilities.) The association of Aodh with Dubhghall appears to have earned Aodh the epithet na nGall (literally "of the Foreigners", but perhaps meaning "of the Hebrideans"). In fact, there may be evidence to suggest that Brian had also been married to a member of Clann Somhairle, perhaps a daughter of Eóghan himself. (Note: Aodh is first accorded the epithet in the context of a great victory over the English at Magh Slécht in 1256. This suggests that Aodh was well acquainted with Clann Somhairle years before his marriage. It is possible that Aodh enjoyed connections with Dubhghall's family as early as 1247. Aodh (and possibly Brian) were not alone in conducting overseas marital alliances during this period. A contemporary and rival of these men, Domhnall Óg Ó Domhnaill, King of Tír Chonaill, married women from Clann Domhnaill (another branch of Clann Somhairle) and Clann Suibhne, kindreds known for their export of gallowglasses.)

== Collapse of Norwegian sovereignty ==
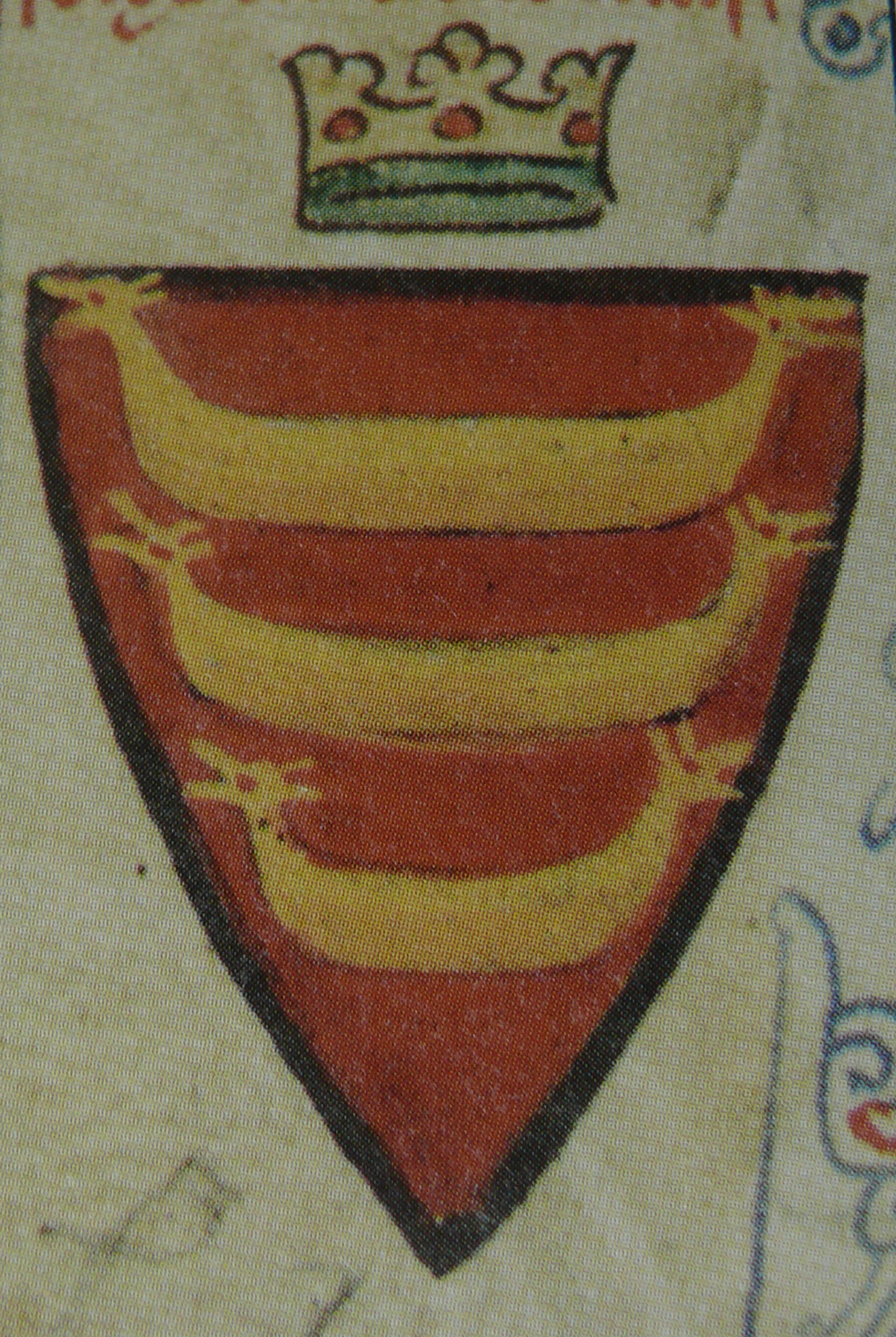
Coat of arms of Hákon Hákonarson as depicted on folio 216v of Cambridge Corpus Christi College Parker Library 16II (Chronica Majora). (Note: This coat of arms is blazoned: gules, three galleys with dragon heads at each end or, one above the other. The coat of arms concerns Hákon's coronation, and its associated caption reads in Latin: "Scutum regis Norwagiae nuper coronati, qui dicitur rex Insularum". The coat of arms was illustrated by Matthew Paris, a man who met Hákon in 1248/1249, the year after the king's coronation. The emphasise that Matthew placed upon the Norwegian realm's sea power appears to be underscored in the heraldry he attributed to Hákon.)

With the death of Alexander II in 1249 the Scottish invasion of the Argyll and the Isles came to an abrupt end. About a decade later, the latter's son and royal successor, Alexander III, came of age and took steps to continue his father's westward expansion. In 1262, the year after yet another failed attempt by the Scottish Crown to purchase the Isles, Hákonar saga Hákonarsonar reports that the Scots lashed out against the Islesmen in a particularly savage attack upon the inhabitants of Skye. Thus provoked, Hákon assembled an enormous fleet—described by the Icelandic annals as the largest force to have ever set sail from Norway—to reassert Norwegian sovereignty along the north and west coasts of Scotland. (Note: Specifically, in the words of the compiler of Hákonar saga Hákonarsonar, Hákon intended to "avenge the warfare that the Scots had made in his dominions".) Amongst the distinguished men stated to have manned Hákon's own vessel was Dubhghall's own son, Eiríkr. (Note: Eiríkr's name is Norse. This could suggest that his mother was Norwegian, and perhaps a member of Hákon's family. A relationship such as this may have been arrange as a means to bind the Hebridean leadership to the Norwegian royal family. Certainly, Hákon's daughter, Cecilía, was married to Dubhghall's contemporary Haraldr.) In July 1263, this armada disembarked from Norway, and by mid August, Hákon reaffirmed his overlordship in Shetland and Orkney, forced the submission of Caithness, and arrived in the Hebrides.

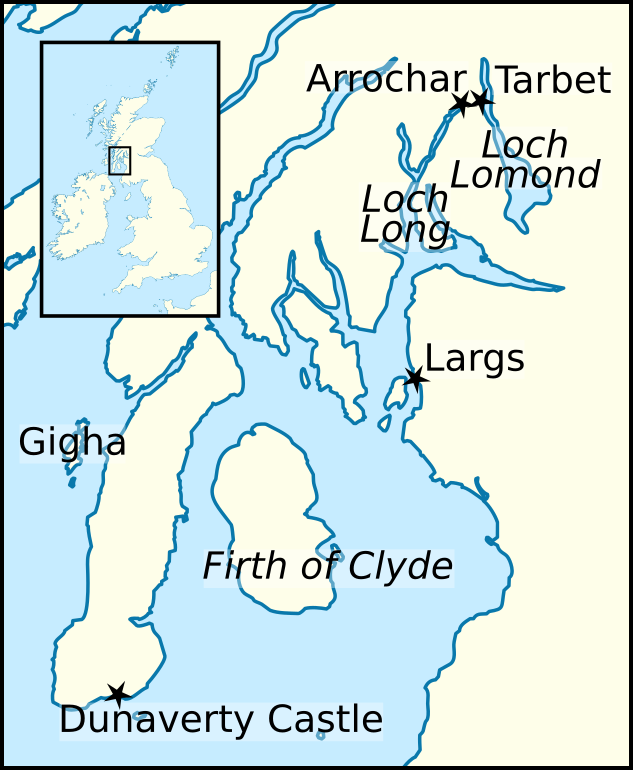
Locations relating to the expedition into the Lennox.

According to the saga, Hákon was met in the region by Magnús (by then the reigning King of Mann and the Isles) and Dubhghall himself. (Note: Before the Norwegian fleet had been assembled in Norway, Hákonar saga Hákonarsonar reveals that Dubhghall had spread rumours in the Isles of an imminent arrival of a fleet, and by doing so deterred Scottish military operations.) As the fleet made its way southwards, Hákon sent a detachment of vessels under the command of Dubhghall and Magnús to harry Kintyre whilst Hákon himself made landfall on Gigha. It is evident that Magnús and Dubhghall were tasked with bringing Aonghus Mór Mac Domhnaill and Murchadh Mac Suibhne onto the king's side. In early September, the reinforced fleet of Norwegians and Islesmen entered the Firth of Clyde.

After peace talks broke down between Hákon and Alexander III, the saga identifies Magnús, Dubhghall, Ailéan, Aonghus Mór, and Murchadh himself, as the commanders of a detachment of Islesmen and Norwegians who entered Loch Long, portaged across land into Loch Lomond, and ravaged the surrounding region of the Lennox. (Note: The saga reveals that the fleet portaged the approximately a 2.5 kilometres (1.6 mi) distance between Arrochar to Tarbet. Although the placename Tarbet is variously stated to mean as "place of portage", this claim may be influenced by the saga's account of the expedition, and the place name actually means "isthmus".) According various versions of the saga, this contingent consisted of either forty or sixty ships—a considerable portion of Hákon's fleet. There is reason to suspect that this strike is evidence that the Norwegians and Islesmen were directing their fury at the territories of the powerful Stewart kindred. Furthermore, by penetrating into the Earldom of Lennox, and possibly striking further east inland, Hákon's adherents would have been encroaching into the Earldom of Menteith. (Note: The Stewarts and the comital family of Lennox were allied in marriage, as Maol Domhnaich, Earl of Lennox was married to Elizabeth Stewart, sister of Walter Stewart, Earl of Menteith.)

Meanwhile, at the beginning of October, Hákon's main force clashed with the Scots at Largs, and withdrew into the Hebrides. Once regrouped with the detachment of Islesmen, the saga records that Hákon rewarded his overseas supporters. Since Eóghan had refused to aid the Norwegians cause, Dubhghall and Ailéan were awarded his forfeited island territories. A certain Ruðri is stated to have received Bute, whilst Murchadh got Arran. (Note: Ruðri may have been a descendant of Óspakr-Hákon, or Dubhghall's father, Ruaidhrí.)

The flight-shy ring-users of the swayer of the din of spears pulled the boats along the broad beach-paths. The fearless war-men of honour devastated the islands in the widely inhabited lake with spear-winds.

— excerpt from Hrafnsmál, by Sturla Þórðarson, extolling the devastation of the Lennox by a detachment of Islesmen including Dubhghall himself.

A commonality amongst some of Hákon's most prominent and steadfast supporters from the Isles was their close connections with Ireland. In fact, the saga reveals that Hákon had previously received overtures from the Irish, requesting the Norwegians combat the English in exchange for overlordship of Ireland. Although the saga reports that the king was eventually dissuaded from such Irish offers, and died in Orkney that December, the Annals of Loch Cé and the Annals of Connacht report his death in context of coming to Ireland. There is reason to suspect that Magnús had once been aligned with Brian; and the fact that the latter's ally Aodh was aligned with Dubhghall and Ailéan strongly suggests that it was Aodh himself who had requested assistance from the Norwegian Crown. In fact, the invitation itself may be one of the most innovative ideas in the history of thirteenth-century Gaelic Ireland. Certainly, Aodh's relationship with Clann Ruaidhrí, and his apparent overtures to the Norwegian Crown, illustrate the radical measures that certain Irish lords were prepared to take in order to overcome English dominance in Ireland. The fact that Dubhghall, Ailéan, and Magnús, were unequivocal supporters of the Norwegian cause against Scottish encroachment in the Isles, and simultaneously involved in Irish affairs, suggests that they were the unidentified men that Alexander attempted to prevent from entering Ireland just prior to the battle at Downpatrick.

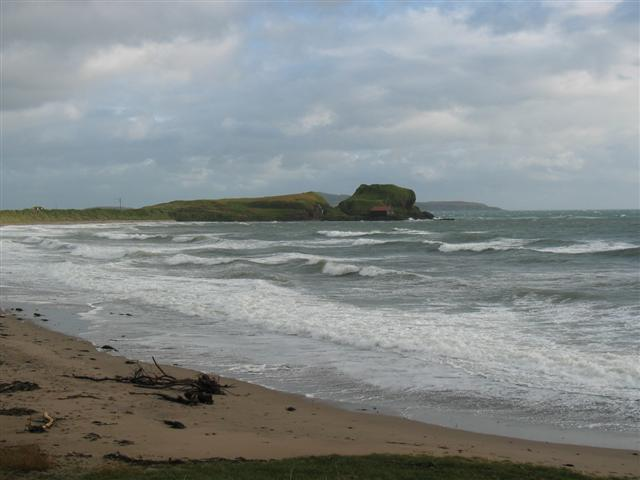
The rocky headland where the scanty remains of Dunaverty Castle lay. The castle fell to Hákon in 1263, who later doled it out to Dubhghall.

Although Hákonar saga Hákonarsonar declares that the operation was an overwhelming triumph, it seems to have been an utter failure instead. Not only did Hákon fail to break Scottish power, but Alexander III seized the initiative the following year, and oversaw a series of invasions into the Isles and northern Scotland. Recognising this dramatic shift in royal authority, Magnús submitted to Alexander III within the year, and in so doing, symbolised the complete collapse of Norwegian sovereignty in the Isles. Dubhghall, on the other hand, contrasted many of his compatriots from the Isles, and stubbornly refused to submit to the Scottish Crown. In fact, the thirteenth-century Magnúss saga lagabœtis reveals that he continued to resist, and conducted military operations against the Scots in Caithness. This source states that Dubhghall attacked the Scots whilst they were extracting a fine from the Caithnessmen, and in so doing seized much of this treasure and slew many of the Scots. This amercement may correspond to one noted by the Scottish exchequer rolls in which two hundred head of cattle were extracted from the Caithnessmen. Whatever the case, in 1266, almost three years after Hákon's abortive campaign, terms of peace were finally agreed upon between the Scottish and Norwegian administrations. Specifically, with the conclusion of the Treaty of Perth in July, Hákon's son and successor, Magnús Hákonarson, King of Norway, formally resigned all rights to Mann and the islands on the western coast of Scotland. In so doing, the territorial dispute over Scotland's western maritime region was finally settled.

Image a. Dubhghall's name and title as it appears on folio 54v (part 2) of Royal Irish Academy P 6 (the Annals of the Four Masters).

Image b. Dubhghall's name and title as it appears on folio 221r of GKS 1005 fol (Flateyjarbók): "Dufgall Sudreyia konungr".

Dubhghall died in 1268. His death is recorded by the Icelandic annals, and various Irish annals, such as the Annals of Loch Cé, the Annals of the Four Masters, and the Annals of Connacht. The latter source styles him "King of Argyll", a title that may add weight to the possibility that Mac Somhairle was indeed his father. (Note: These three Irish annals respectively style Dubhghall him on his death: "rí Innsi Gall & Oirir Ghaoidel", "tighearna Innsi Gall & Airir Gaoidheal", and "ri Orir Gaidel". These sources respectively style Mac Somhairle on his death: "ri Airir Gaoidel", "ticcherna Airer Ghaoidheal", and "ri Airir Gaidil".) Whatever the case, Dubhghall's demise is not noticed by existing Scottish sources, and it is possible that he died in Norway. Certainly, Eiríkr remained loyal to the Norwegian cause, and was himself a prominent baron of this northern realm. From the 1260s, Clann Ruaidhrí disappears from the Scottish historical record. When the kindred finally reemerges in 1275, it is in the person of Dubhghall's brother, Ailéan, a man who was by then a prominent Scottish magnate, and representative of Clann Ruaidhrí. Unlike Dubhghall, Ailéan is not accorded any title in contemporary sources. Nevertheless, there is reason to suspect that the title rí Innsi Gall accorded to an apparent Clann Ruaidhrí chieftain in 1318—a man possibly identical to one of Ailéan's sons—was that of Ailéan's lordship and inherited from him. In any case, it was during Ailéan's tenure that the kindred assimilated into the Scottish realm, and his descendants continued to be factors in Scottish history well into the fourteenth century. Another son of Dubhghall, Donnchadh, appears on record in the late thirteenth century.

== Ancestry ==
Ancestors of Dubhghall mac Ruaidhrí

16. Giolla Brighde mac Giolla Adhamhnáin
8. Somhairle mac Giolla Brighde (died 1164)
4. Raghnall mac Somhairle (died 1191/1192 – c. 1210/1227)
18. Óláfr Guðrøðarson (died 1153)
9. Ragnhildr Óláfsdóttir
2. Ruaidhrí mac Raghnaill (died 1247 ?)
1. Dubhghall mac Ruaidhrí (died 1268)
