= Gallowglass =

Class of elite mercenary warriors

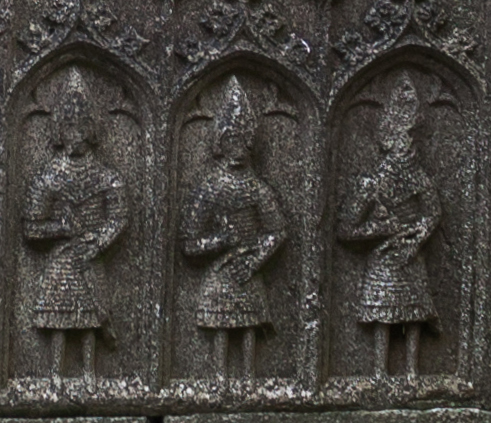
15th-century depiction of gallowglasses on Felim O'Connor's tomb

The gallowglasses (also spelled galloglass, gallowglas or galloglas; from Irish gallóglach, meaning "foreign warrior") were a class of elite mercenary warriors in Ireland, who were originally members of Norse-Gaelic clans from the Scottish Highlands prior to arriving in Ireland between the mid-13th century and late 16th century. Despite sharing a common background and language with the Irish, they were referred to as Gall Gaeil ("foreign Gaels") since they were descendants of 10th-century Norse settlers who had intermarried with the local population in western Scotland.

An early family of gallowglasses was the MacSweeneys, settled by the O'Donnells in north Donegal. These were followed by MacDonnells, MacAlisters, MacCabes and several other groups settled by Irish rulers in different areas. The gallowglasses were attractive as heavily armoured, trained infantry to be relied upon as a strong defence for holding a position, unlike the standard Irish soldier, the kern who fought with little if any armour.

They were a significant part of Irish infantry before the advent of gunpowder, and depended upon seasonal employment by Irish clan chiefs. An Irish military leader would often choose a gallowglass to serve as his personal aide and bodyguard because, as a foreigner, a gallowglass might be less influenced by the internal feuds over dynastic succession within the derbfine of the Irish clans.

== Name ==
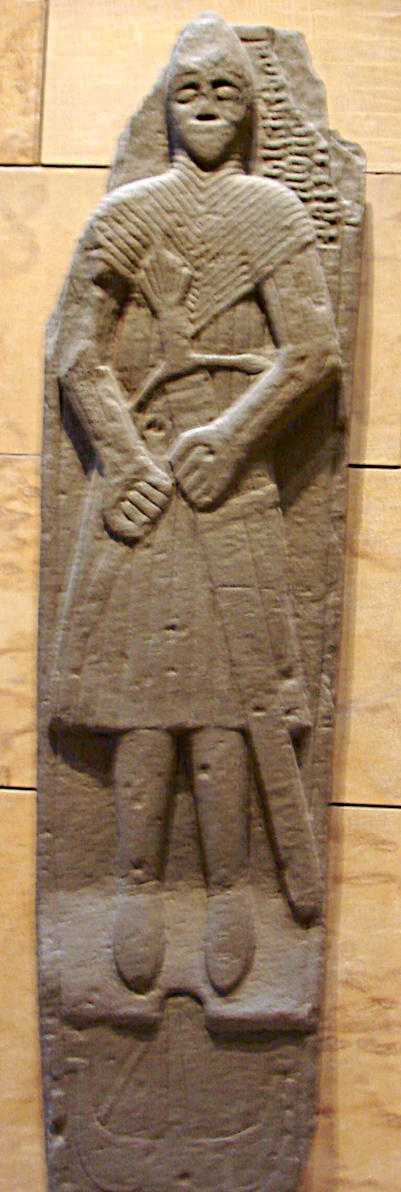
A Medieval Hebridean warrior

The English word gallowglass derives from the Irish gallóglach, meaning "foreign warrior", from gall, "foreign", and óglach, "warrior". It was likely a plural form originally, the singular form being gallowgla(gh); however, it was reinterpreted as a singular form early on, leading to the formation of a new plural, gallowglasses.

== Origin and description ==
The gallowglasses were from the western coast of Scotland, principally Argyll and the Western Isles. Their weapons were swords and axes. Each was usually accompanied by a man to take care of his weapons and armour and a boy to carry provisions.

A description from 1600 speaks of the gallowglasses as "pycked and seelected men of great and mightie bodies, crewell without compassion. The greatest force of the battell consisteth in them, chosinge rather to dye then to yeelde, so that when yt cometh to handy blowes they are quickly slayne or win the feilde".

== History ==
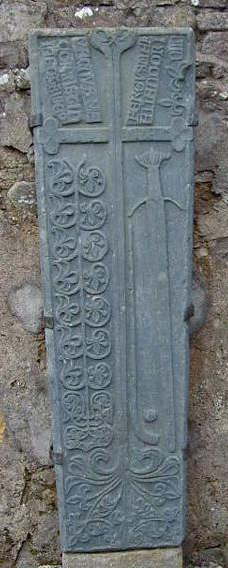
Gallowglass gravestone from Cloncha Church, Ireland, circa 15–16th century. Note the hurling stick and ball.

The first record of gallowglass service was in 1259, when Aedh Ó Conchobair, King of Connacht, received a dowry of 160 Scottish warriors from the daughter of Dubhghall mac Ruaidhrí, the King of the Hebrides. They were organised into groups known as a corrughadh, which consisted of about 100 men.

The importation of gallowglasses into Ireland was a major factor in containing the Anglo-Norman invasion of the 12th century, as their ranks stiffened the resistance of the Irish lordships. Throughout the Middle Ages in Ireland, gallowglass troops were maintained by Gaelic Irish and Hiberno-Norman lords alike. Even the English Lord Deputy of Ireland usually kept a company of them in his service.

In return for military service, gallowglass contingents were given land and settled in Irish lordships, where they were entitled to receive supplies from the local population.

The Battle of Knockdoe in 1504 was one of Ireland's bloodiest medieval battles, featuring thousands of Gallowglass mercenaries fighting for both sides, led by Gearóid Mór FitzGerald, 8th Earl of Kildare and Ulick Fionn Burke, 6th Clanricarde.

By 1512, there were reported to be fifty-nine groups throughout the country under the control of the Irish nobility. Though initially they were mercenaries, over time they settled and their ranks became filled with both Scots-Norse and many native Irish men.

In 1569, Turlough Luineach O'Neill (the O'Neill) married Lady Agnes Campbell, daughter of Colin Campbell, 3rd Earl of Argyll, and widow of James MacDonald, 6th of Dunnyveg. Her dowry consisted of at least 1,200 gallowglass fighters. Along with two young men as support and friends on top to assist or fight this could easily have numbered over 5,000 current and future gallowglasses coming into the area.

They were noted for wielding the massive two-handed sparth axe (a custom noted by Geraldus Cambrensis, died c. 1223, to have derived from their Norse heritage) and broadsword or claymore (claidheamh mór). For armour, the gallowglasses wore a mail shirt over a padded jacket and an iron helmet; he was usually accompanied by two boys (like a knight's squires), one of whom carried his throwing spears while the other carried his provisions.

Shakespeare mentions gallowglasses in Macbeth, although along with other aspects of the play it is an anachronism, as the historical Macbeth lived in the 11th century:

The merciless Macdonwald,
Worthy to be a rebel, for to that
The multiplying villainies of nature
Do swarm upon him, from the Western isles
Of kerns and gallowglasses is supplied

In the paper "A Description of the Power of Irishmen", written early in the 16th century, the Irish forces of Leinster are numbered at 522 horses and five battalions of gallowglasses (gallóglaigh) and 1,432 kerne, and those of the other provinces were in like proportion. Mac Cárthaigh Mór commanded 40 horses, two battalions of gallowglasses, and 2,000 kerne; the Earl of Desmond 400 horses, three battalions of gallowglasses, and 3,000 kerne, besides a battalion of crossbowmen and gunners, the smaller chieftains supplying each their quota of men.

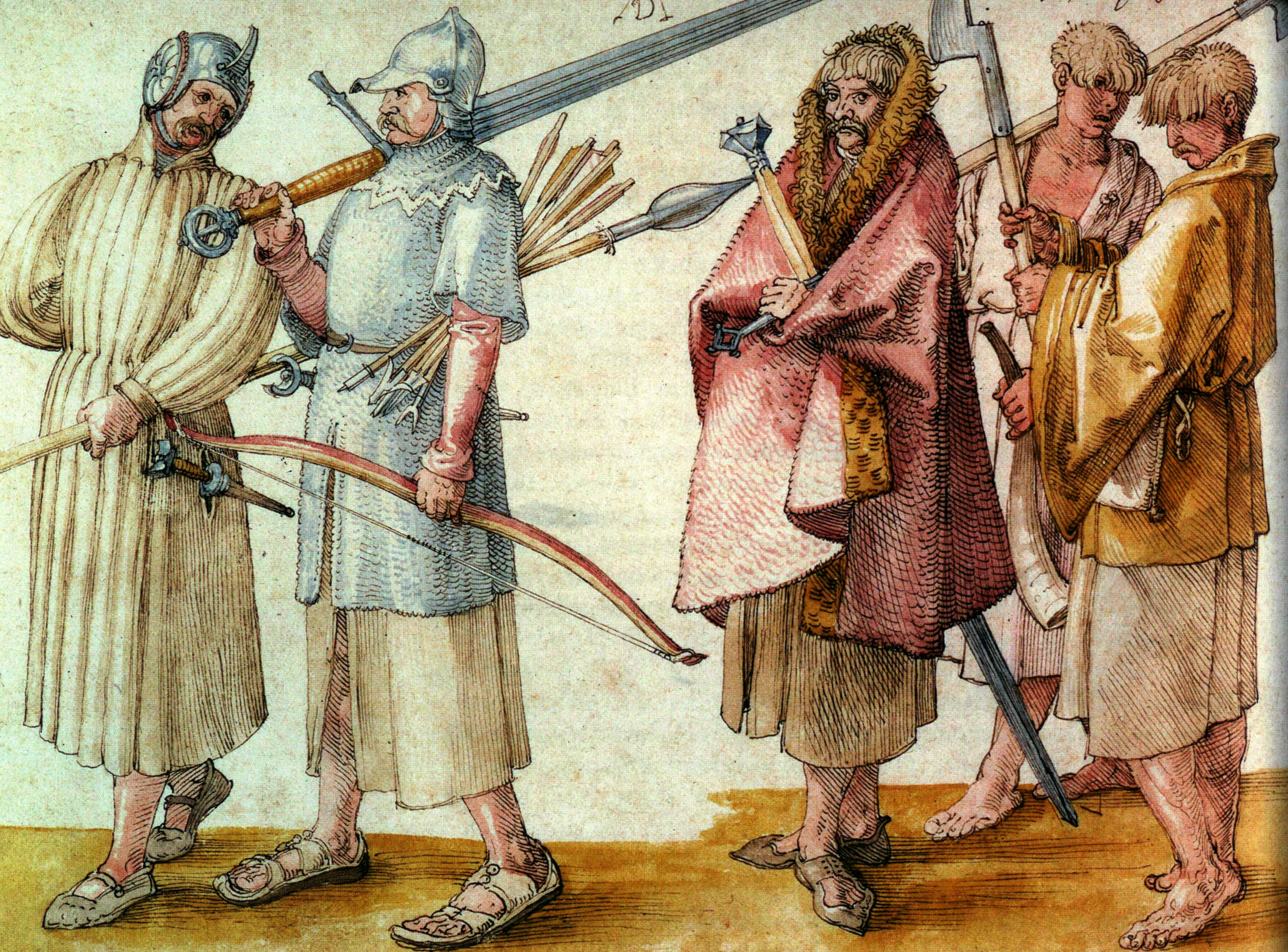
Irish gallowglass and kern. Drawing by Albrecht Dürer, 1521. This is now thought to have been derived from a 1518 written account by Laurent Vital, rather than a drawing from life.

In 1517, "when the reformacion of the countrye was taken in hand", it was reported that the Irish forces in Thomond were 750 horses, 2,324 kerne, and six "batayles" of gallowglasses, the latter including 60 to 80 footmen harnessed with spears; each of these had a man to bear his harness, some of whom themselves carried spears or bows.

Every kerne had a bow, a "skieve" or quiver, three spears, a sword, and a skene or sgian (Irish scian or Scottish Gaelic sgian), each two of them having a lad to carry their weapons. The horsemen had two horses apiece, some three, the second bearing the "knave" or his attendant.

The 16th century in Ireland saw an escalation in military conflict, caused by the Tudor conquest of Ireland. Gallowglass fighters were joined by native Irish mercenaries called buanadha (literally "quartered men") and by newer Scottish mercenaries known as "redshanks". During the First Desmond Rebellion, Lord President of Munster Sir William Drury ordered the execution of 700 captured gallowglasses.

Despite the increased use of firearms in Irish warfare, gallowglasses remained an important part of Hugh Ó Neill's forces in the Nine Years' War. After the combined Irish defeat at the Battle of Kinsale in 1601, recruitment of gallowglasses waned, although Scottish Highland mercenaries continued to come to Ireland until the 1640s (notably Alasdair Mac Colla). They fought under the Irish general Owen Roe O'Neill at the Battle of Benburb when O'Neill had an overwhelming victory in 1646. The gallowglasses of the Mac Cárthaigh Riabhaigh are recorded as having attacked Mallow in County Cork as late as 1645.

Images of gallowglasses fighting as mercenaries in European mainland armies were sketched by Dürer in 1521 and later by French and Dutch artists. Gallowglasses served in the Dutch Blue Guards, Swiss Guard, the French Scottish Guard, and the forces of King Gustavus Adolphus of Sweden in his invasion of Livonia during the Thirty Years' War.

Millford in County Donegal, historically called Ballynagalloglagh (from Irish: Baile na nGallóglach), is a small town and townland whose Irish name means "town of the gallowglasses". A battle between the Irish (helped by gallóglaigh) and the English took place on a hill in the townland and this is where the name comes from.

== See also ==
- Fianna
- Gallogly, a surname
- Úlfhéðnar
- Kern

== Sources ==
- G. A. Hayes McCoy, Irish Battles, Appletree Press, Belfast, 1990.
- Colm Lennon, Sixteenth Century Ireland: The Incomplete Conquest, Gill & MacMillan, Dublin 1994.
- The Galloglass Project (compiled at TCD, placed online at UCC)
