= Agnes Herbert =

British writer and big game hunter

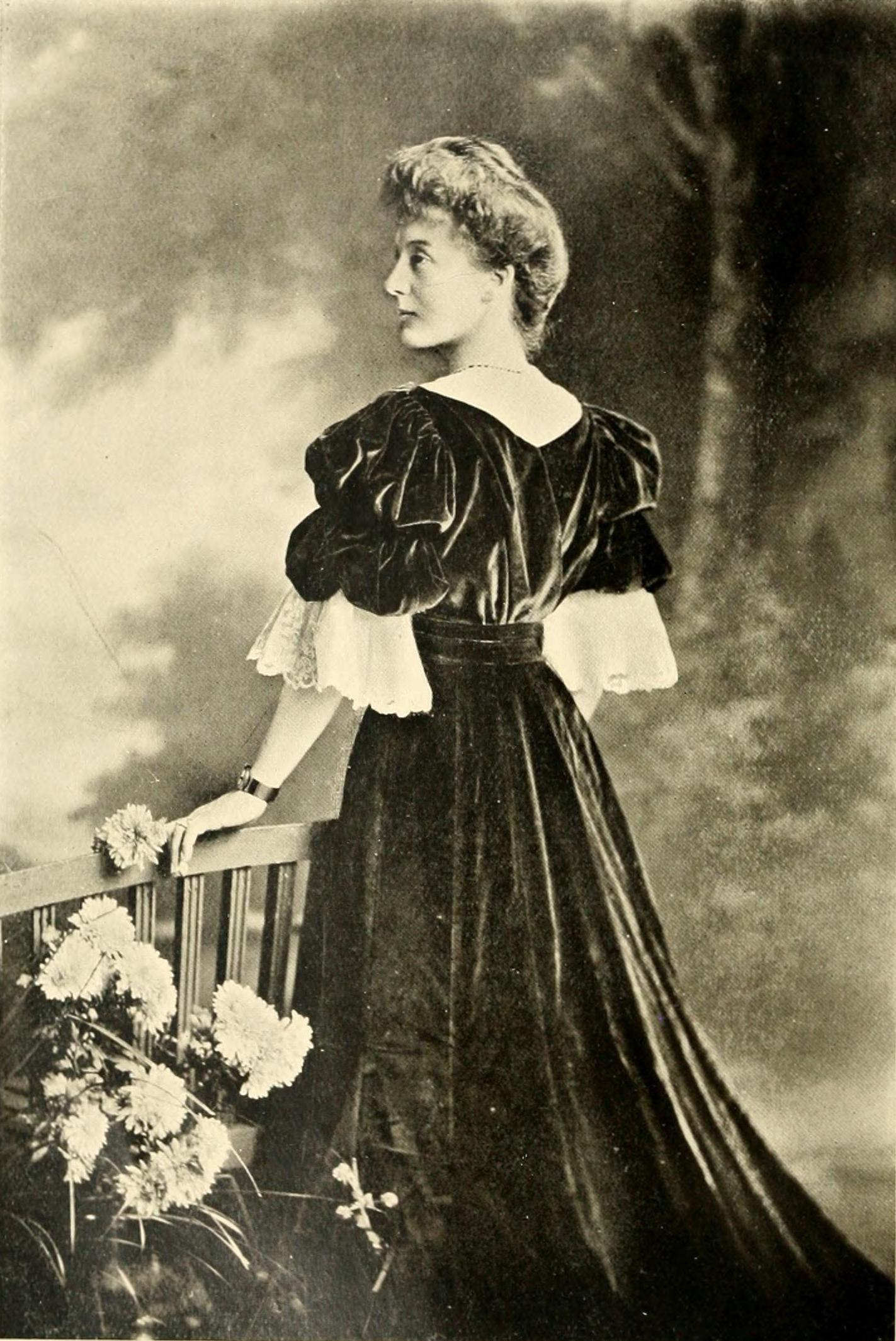
Portrait c. 1908

Agnes Elsie Diana Herbert née Thorpe OBE (31 January 1873 – 1960) was a British travel writer and big game hunter.

== Biography ==
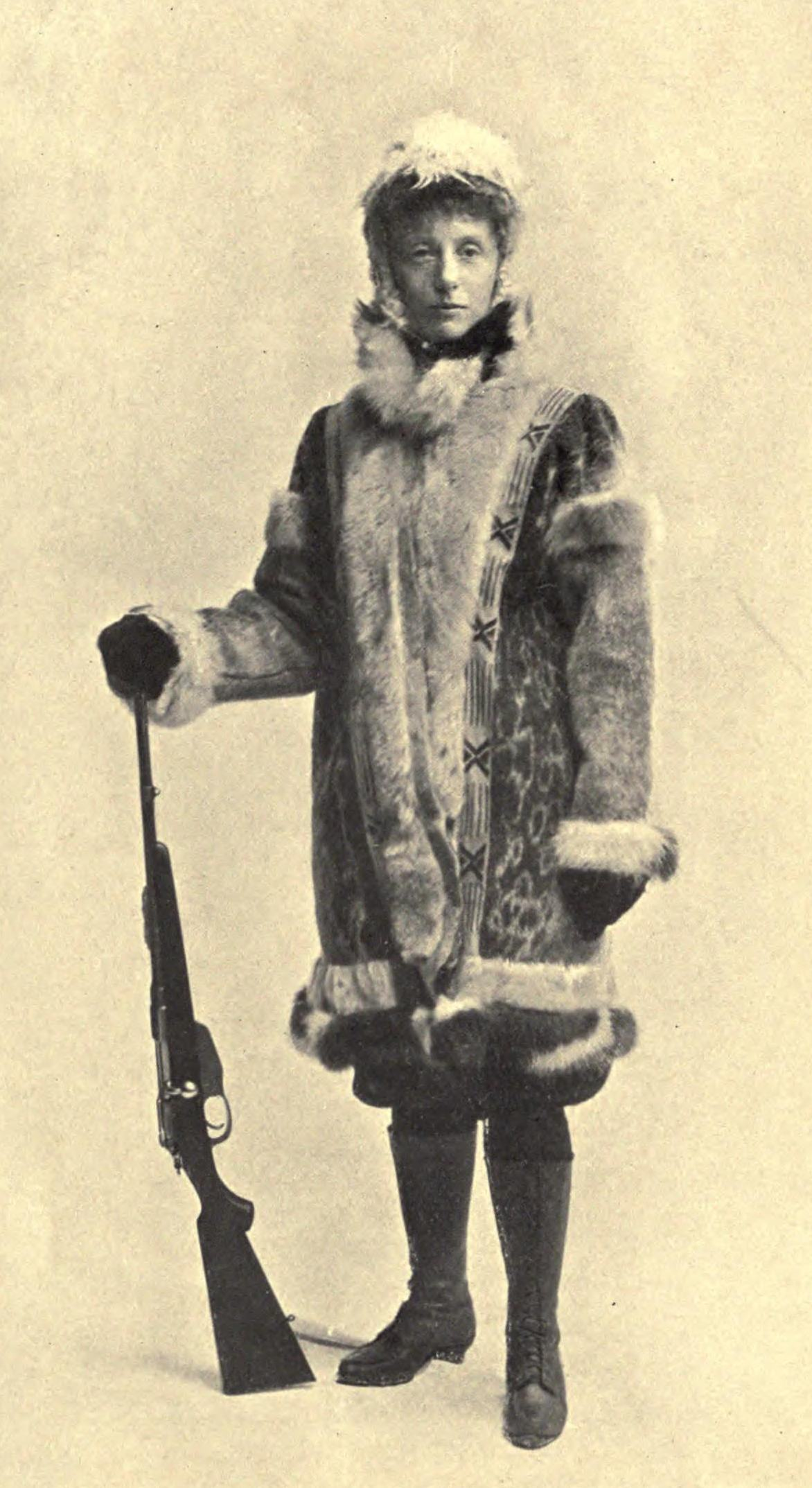
Herbert in Alaska

Agnes Herbert was born in Pendleton, Greater Manchester, where her father James Bateman Thorpe (1845–1905) was an East India Merchant married to Helena Agnes née Dickinson (d, 1930). In 1883, the family moved to Port Erin, a village on the Isle of Man.

In 1891, the family moved to Vancouver and Agnes married William George Herbert Field (1868–1928), son of court clerk in Plymouth. She then had a child Alleyne Egerton in 1892 who died in infancy. A month after Alleyne's death, Agnes was pregnant once again. In 1893, Agnes gave birth to her daughter Violet Elsie Bradda Field (1893–1957), who was named after Bradda Head on the Isle of Man. The family then moved to Montana and here her husband abandoned the family. William eventually ended up in Hawaii and married Margaret Rebecca Nape with whom he had six children before his death in 1928. Herbert moved back later to England and lived with her parents in Didsbury near Manchester. After the death of her father in 1905, Herbert launched her career in writing - intentionally obscuring her marital and maternal status in order to gain acceptance and opportunities in the genre of adventure and hunting literature.

With a cousin, Cecily Baird (later married to Ralph Windus), she visited the Canadian Rockies, where the two women taught Chinese kitchen workers in mining camps how to cook English-style food; they also tried hunting. In 1906, the two cousins left on a hunting trip to Somaliland. She offered the publisher John Lane to read and review all the sporting books they published in 1909. She then moved on to A&C Black. She helped her daughter Bradda Field publish through Bodley Head.

Herbert was a member of the Society of Women Journalists, also serving as its vice-chair from 1929 to 1933 and later vice-president. She was editor of the Writers' & Artists' Yearbook from 1922 to 1929.

In 1931, Herbert, by then married to a Stewart, was named an officer of the Order of the British Empire.

== Selected bibliography ==
- Two Dianas in Somaliland: The Record of a Shooting Trip (1908)
- Isle of Man (1909)
- Two Dianas in Alaska (1909)
- The Life Story of a Lion (1911)
- Casuals in the Caucasus: The Diary of a Sporting Holiday (1912)
- The Moose (1913)
- The Elephant (1917)
- Northumberland. Painted by A. Heaton Cooper. Described by Agnes Herbert (1923)
- A Girl's Adventure in Korea (1924)

== See also ==
- List of famous big game hunters
