= Port Erin Breakwater Railway =

Railway line on the Isle of Man

Coordinates: 54.085°N 4.767°W

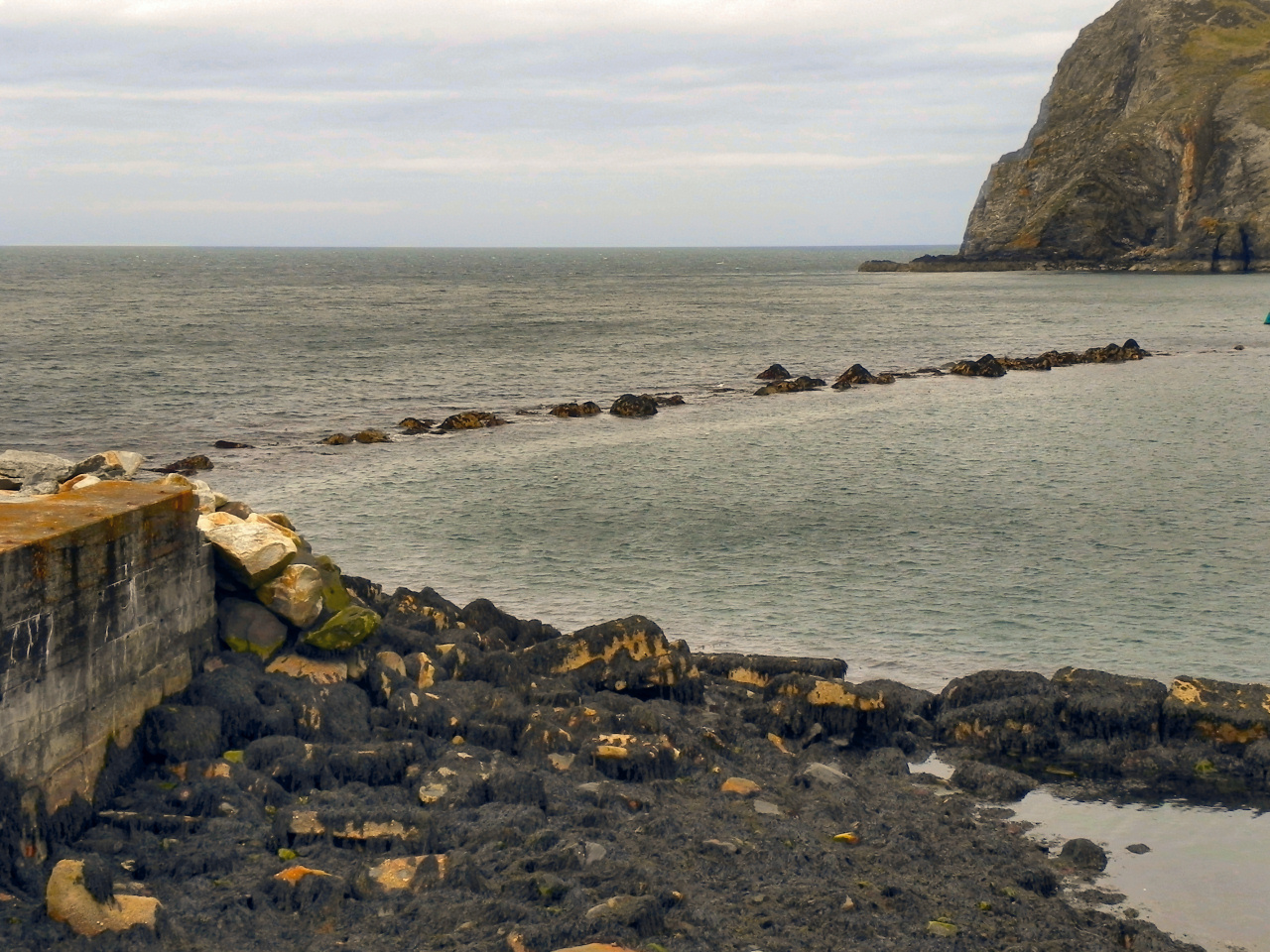
Remains of the Port Erin breakwater

The Port Erin Breakwater Railway was a 7 ft (2,134 mm) gauge railway used for the construction of a breakwater in the village of Port Erin on the Isle of Man. It came into use in 1864 and was the first steam railway on the island, as well as the only broad gauge line.

== History ==
In the 1840s, it was desired to provide a harbour of refuge at Port Erin. There was no other suitable place available at all states of tide between Port St. Mary and Peel. In 1864 an enabling act of Parliament, the Isle of Man Harbours Act 1863, was passed by the British Government to authorise construction of a breakwater.

The railway ran from a workshop on the south side of Port Erin bay to the site of the breakwater itself, passing a quarry used to obtain stone for the construction and a concrete-mixing plant. The breakwater was 950 ft (290 m) long and built from concrete blocks, weighing between 14 and 17 tons each, on a base of loose rubble.

The railway had a single 0-4-0WT locomotive built in Leeds by E. B. Wilson and Company in 1853 (works number 454) and named Henry B. Loch after the then lieutenant governor of the island. Some photographs exist of the breakwater construction and locomotive. The line's other rolling stock included three steam cranes and a number of wagons. The breakwater was completed in 1876 and the locomotive probably returned to England after this.

== Present day remains ==
The breakwater itself was destroyed by storm damage in 1884, although its remains can still be seen in Port Erin bay. The most notable surviving relic from the railway is the former workshop and engine shed, now known as the Harbourmaster's Office and Coal Shed. It is entered on the Isle of Man Protected Buildings Register and now occupied by a wine bar and workshop space. There is some sections of Rail used to reinforce the breakwater. Some are conventional railway rail but there is some sections of Broad Gauge Bridgerail concreted between the boulders. There's also the remains of the sawn off Gantry timbers incorporated into the breakwater.

== See also ==
- Transport on the Isle of Man
