= Museum of the Year =

Annual award for a museum in the United Kingdom

Art Fund Museum of the Year
- Logo of the 2019 prize
- Sponsored by: Art Fund
- Location: United Kingdom
- First award: 1973
- Website: Art Fund Museum of Year

The Museum of the Year Award, formerly known as the Gulbenkian Prize and the Art Fund Prize, is an annual prize awarded to a museum or gallery in the United Kingdom for a "track record of imagination, innovation and excellence". The award of £100,000 is Britain's biggest single art prize, and the largest single museum arts prize in the world. The prize and is presented to a museum or gallery, large or small, anywhere in the UK, whose entry, in the opinion of the judges, best demonstrates a track record of imagination, innovation and excellence through work mainly undertaken during the previous calendar year.

== History ==
The Museum of the Year was awarded by the British charity National Heritage from 1973 to 2000. In 2001, the Museum Prize Trust was established with the aim of creating a single award to replace this prize and three others awarded by the Museums Association, the Art Fund and the Campaign for Museums. The Gulbenkian Prize, as this was known, was first awarded in 2003. The prize's principal sponsor until 2007 was the Lisbon-based Calouste Gulbenkian Foundation, but since 2008 it has been sponsored by the Art Fund. It adopted its current name in late 2012, and the first award under the new name was given in 2013.

Since 2011 the Clore Award for Museum Learning, worth £10,000 and sponsored by the Clore Duffield Foundation, has been awarded for "quality museum and gallery learning with children and young people (from early years up to the age of 25) in any setting, in or out of school or college". For its first two years this award had a separate shortlist but in 2013 it was awarded to an institution on the Museum of the Year shortlist, which had expanded from four to ten finalists.

== List of winners and shortlisted entries ==
=== National Heritage Museum of the Year (1973–2000) ===
Year	Winner
1973	Museum of Lakeland Life & Industry, Kendal, Cumbria
1974	National Motor Museum, Beaulieu, Hampshire
1975	Weald and Downland Open Air Museum, Singleton, West Sussex
1976	Gladstone Pottery Museum, Stoke-on-Trent, Staffordshire
1977	Ironbridge Gorge Museum, Telford, Shropshire
1978	Erddig Hall, Wrexham
1978	Museum of London
1979	Guernsey Museum and Art Gallery, Saint Peter Port
1980	Natural History Museum, London
1981	Hunday Farm Museum, Stocksfield, Northumberland
1982	Potteries Museum and Art Gallery, Stoke-on-Trent, Staffordshire
1983	Ulster Folk and Transport Museum, Cultra, County Down
1984	Quarry Bank Mill, Styal, Cheshire
1985	Burrell Collection, Glasgow
1986	Beamish, The North of England Open Air Museum, County Durham
1987	Manchester Museum
1988	National Museum of Photography, Film and Television, Bradford, West Yorkshire
1989	National Portrait Gallery at Bodelwyddan Castle, Denbighshire
1990	Imperial War Museum, London
1990	Museum of Science & Industry, Manchester
1991	National Railway Museum, York
1992	Manx National Museum, Douglas
1993	Jersey Museum and Art Gallery, St Helier
1993	Jersey Maritime Museum, St Helier
1994	Tower Museum, Derry, County Londonderry
1995	Ryedale Folk Museum, Hutton-le-Hole, North Yorkshire
1996	Buckinghamshire County Museum, Aylesbury
1996	National Trust exhibition at Uppark, South Harting, West Sussex
1997	Waddesdon Manor, Buckinghamshire
1998	House of Manannan: Manx National Heritage, Peel
1998	Jersey Maritime Museum, St Helier
1999	River and Rowing Museum, Henley-on-Thames, Oxfordshire
2000	British Museum, London

=== Gulbenkian Prize (2003–2007) ===
Year	Winner	Shortlisted
2003	National Centre for Citizenship, Galleries of Justice, Nottingham	Collections, Communities and Memories Community Project, Clifton Park Museum, Rotherham, South Yorkshire; Darwin Centre Phase One, Natural History Museum, London; RRS Discovery, Discovery Point, Dundee
2004	Scottish National Gallery of Modern Art, Edinburgh	Museum of Antiquities, Newcastle upon Tyne; Pembrokeshire Museum Service; Norton Priory Museum, Runcorn, Cheshire
2005	Big Pit National Coal Museum, Blaenavon, Torfaen	Coventry Transport Museum; Time and Tide Museum, Great Yarmouth, Norfolk; Locomotion: the National Railway Museum at Shildon, County Durham
2006	SS Great Britain, Bristol	Hunterian Museum, Royal College of Surgeons, London; The Collection: Art and Archeology, Lincolnshire; Yorkshire Sculpture Park, Wakefield
2007	Pallant House Gallery, Chichester, West Sussex	Kelvingrove Art Gallery and Museum, Glasgow; Kew Palace, London; Weston Park Museum, Sheffield

=== Art Fund Prize (2008–2012) ===
Year	Winner	Shortlisted
2008	The Lightbox, Woking, Surrey	Breaking the Chains, British Empire & Commonwealth Museum, Bristol; Shetland Museum and Archives, Shetland; Wellcome Collection, London
2009	Wedgwood Museum, Stoke-on-Trent, Staffordshire	Centre of New Enlightenment, Kelvingrove Art Gallery and Museum, Glasgow; Orleans House Gallery, Twickenham, London; Ruthin Craft Centre: Centre for the Applied Arts, Denbighshire
2010	Ulster Museum, Belfast	Ashmolean Museum, University of Oxford; Blists Hill Victorian Town, Telford, Shropshire; Herbert Art Gallery and Museum, Coventry
2011	A History of the World in 100 Objects, British Museum, London	Polar Museum, University of Cambridge; Robert Burns Birthplace Museum, Alloway, Ayrshire; Roman Baths Museum, Bath, Somerset
2012	Royal Albert Memorial Museum, Exeter, Devon	The Hepworth Wakefield; Scottish National Portrait Gallery, Edinburgh; Watts Gallery, Compton, Surrey

=== Art Fund Museum of the Year (2013–) ===
Year	Winner	Shortlisted
2013	William Morris Gallery, Walthamstow, London	The Hepworth Wakefield, winner of the Clore Award for Learning; Baltic Centre for Contemporary Art, Gateshead, Tyne and Wear; The Beaney, Canterbury, Kent; Dulwich Picture Gallery, London; Horniman Museum and Gardens, London; Kelvingrove Art Gallery and Museum, Glasgow; Museum of Archaeology and Anthropology, University of Cambridge; Narberth Museum, Pembrokeshire; Preston Hall Museum and Park, Stockton-on-Tees, County Durham
2014	Yorkshire Sculpture Park, Wakefield	Ditchling Museum of Art + Craft, Ditchling, East Sussex; Hayward Gallery, London; Mary Rose Museum, Portsmouth, Hampshire; Sainsbury Centre for Visual Arts, Norwich, Norfolk; Tate Britain, London
2015	Whitworth Art Gallery, Manchester	Dunham Massey Hall, Greater Manchester; Imperial War Museum, London; The MAC, Belfast; Oxford University Museum of Natural History, Oxford; Tower of London
2016	Victoria and Albert Museum, London	Arnolfini, Bristol; Bethlem Museum of the Mind, Beckenham, London; Jupiter Artland, Edinburgh; York Art Gallery
2017	The Hepworth Wakefield	Lapworth Museum of Geology, Birmingham; National Heritage Centre for Horseracing & Sporting Art, Newmarket, Suffolk; Sir John Soane's Museum, London; Tate Modern, London
2018	Tate St Ives	Brooklands Museum, Weybridge, Surrey; Ferens Art Gallery, Kingston upon Hull; Glasgow Women's Library; The Postal Museum, London
2019	St Fagans National Museum of History, Cardiff	HMS Caroline, Belfast; Nottingham Contemporary; Pitt Rivers Museum, Oxford; V&A Dundee
2020	Aberdeen Art Gallery	—N/a
2020	Gairloch Museum, Wester Ross	—N/a
2020	Science Museum, London	—N/a
2020	South London Gallery, Camberwell, London	—N/a
2020	Towner Eastbourne	—N/a
2021	Firstsite, Colchester	Centre for Contemporary Art, Derry; Experience Barnsley; Thackray Museum of Medicine, Leeds; Timespan, Helmsdale
2022	Horniman Museum, London	Museum of Making, Derby; People's History Museum, Manchester; The Story Museum, Oxford; Tŷ Pawb, Wrexham
2023	Burrell Collection, Glasgow	Leighton House, London; The MAC, Belfast; Natural History Museum, London; Scapa Flow Museum, Stromness
2024	Young V&A, London	Craven Museum & Gallery, Skipton, North Yorkshire; Dundee Contemporary Arts; Manchester Museum; National Portrait Gallery, London
2025	Beamish, The Living Museum of the North, County Durham	Chapter, Cardiff; Compton Verney, Warwickshire; Golden Thread Gallery, Belfast; Perth Museum
2026	The Box, Plymouth	National Gallery, London; V&A East Storehouse, London; Norwich Castle Museum, Norwich; Fitzwilliam Museum, Cambridge

== See also ==
- List of awards for contributions to culture
- European Museum of the Year Award
- Europa Nostra
- The Best in Heritage
