= Port Erin =

Village on the Isle of Man

Coordinates: 54.086°N 4.756°W

Port Erin: Manx: Purt Çhiarn
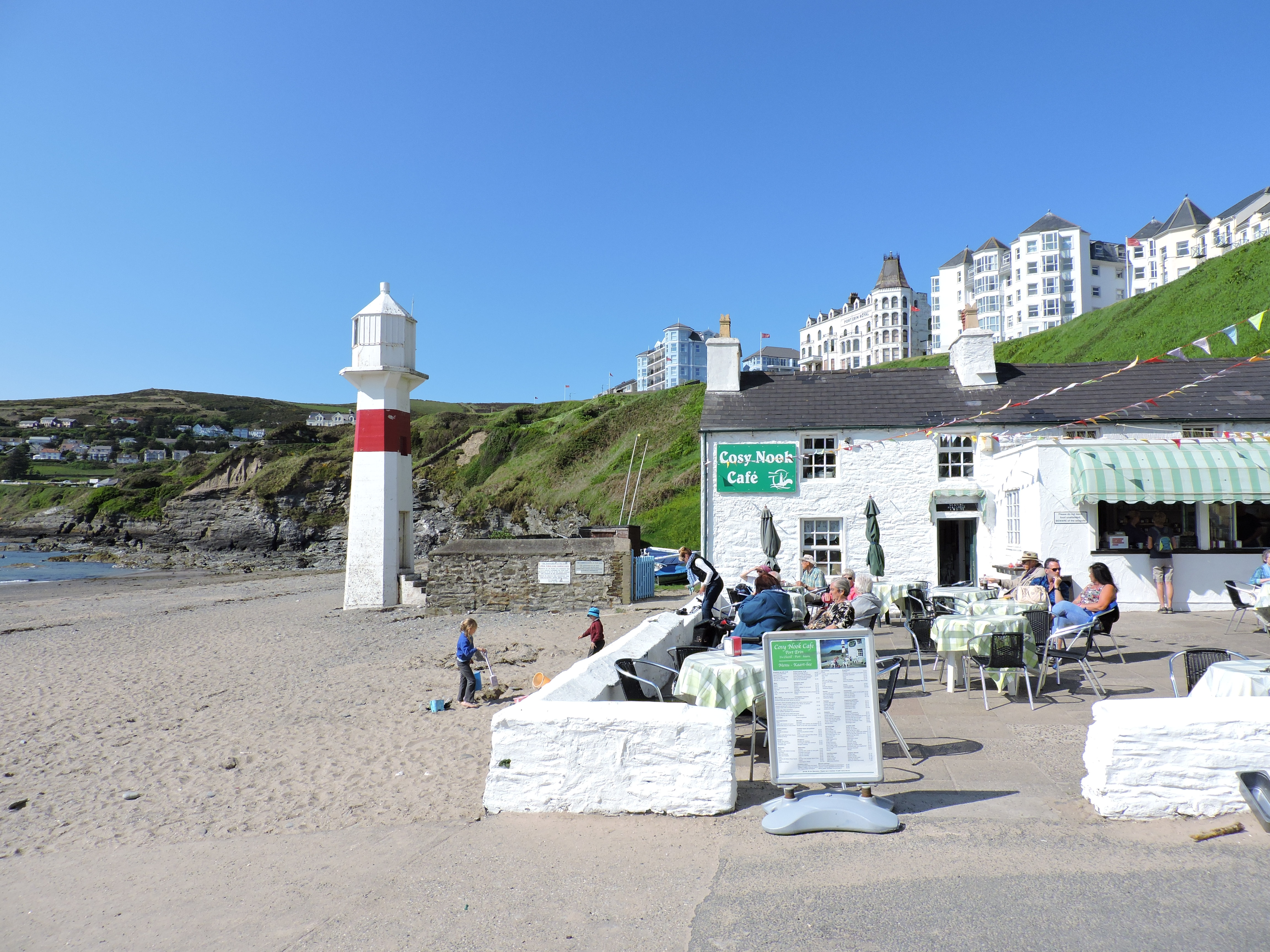
- The Cosy Nook cafe at the western end of Port Erin beach.

- Location within the Isle of Man
- Population: 3,730 (2021 census)
  - Douglas: 12 miles (19 km)
- Parish: Rushen
- Sheading: Rushen
- Crown dependency: Isle of Man
- Post town: Isle of Man
- Postcode district: IM9
- Dialling code: 01624
- Police: Isle of Man
- Fire: Isle of Man
- Ambulance: Isle of Man
- House of Keys: Rushen

Port Erin (Manx: Purt Çhiarn 'lord's port' or originally 'Irish port') is a seaside village in the south-west of the Isle of Man, in the historic parish of Rushen. It was previously a seaside resort before the decline of the tourist trade.

Administratively it is designated as a village district, with its own board of Commissioners. The district covers around 1 square mile, and is adjacent to: Port St Mary to the south-east; the main part of Arbory and Rushen parish district to the north and east; the sea to the west; and an exclave of Arbory and Rushen parish district (including the village of Cregneash) to the south. Following recent residential expansion, the settlement is now contiguous with that of Port St Mary, and on 18 July 2018 Tynwald authorised a public enquiry into the proposed expansion of the district boundary to include some of this expansion.

The village is twinned with Latour-de-France.

== Etymology ==
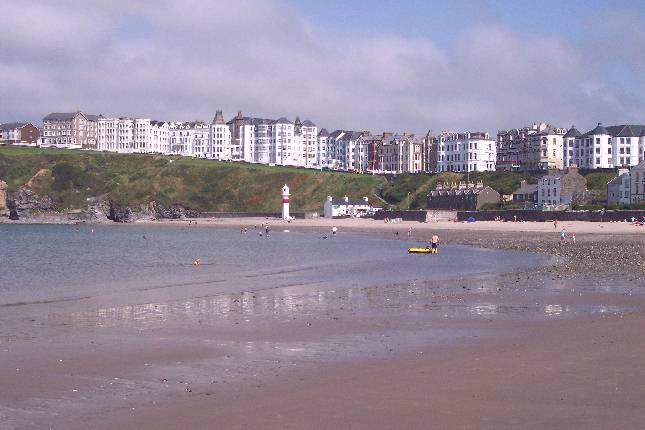

The English toponym Port Erin means 'Irish port', coming from "Gaelic" (named as such in the source) port Éireann, which then was anglicized. The Manx version Purt Çhiarn is explained through the palatalization of plosive /t/ into affricate /tʃ/, resulting a pronunciation like [poːrˈtʃɑːrn]. The -eann ending was reduced due to its unstressed nature. The Éi- /eː/ lowered into /ɛː/ in the presence of /r/ and was thereafter confused with the existing Manx word çhiarn 'lord'.

The toponym has variably been spelt <Port Iron>, possibly from an earlier form Port Yiarn (showing no palatalization of /t/). Cregeen's Dictionary (1835) writes Erin as <Sheearan> ~ <Sheearayn>, which Kneen speculates must have been confused as a derivation from Manx sheear 'westerly'.

== History ==
The outer breakwater, visible at low tide only, was an abandoned project constructed in 1863 using the Port Erin Breakwater Railway and saw the first steam locomotive used on the Island; a severe storm of 1884 later destroyed the breakwater and it was never rebuilt. Today, a marker buoy shows the extent of the breakwater, and the landward end is still clearly discernible. To the north-east, by the A7 road, are the earthwork remains of a motte-and-bailey castle known as Cronk Howe Mooar, possibly the site of a timber fortification built by Magnus Barelegs [Barefoot] c. 1100.

The oldest building in the village is known as "white cottage" or "Christian's cottage"; it was built by William Christian and his family in 1781. The Christian family still own the cottage today.

During World War II the village was the location of Port Erin Women's Detention Camp.

== Demographics ==
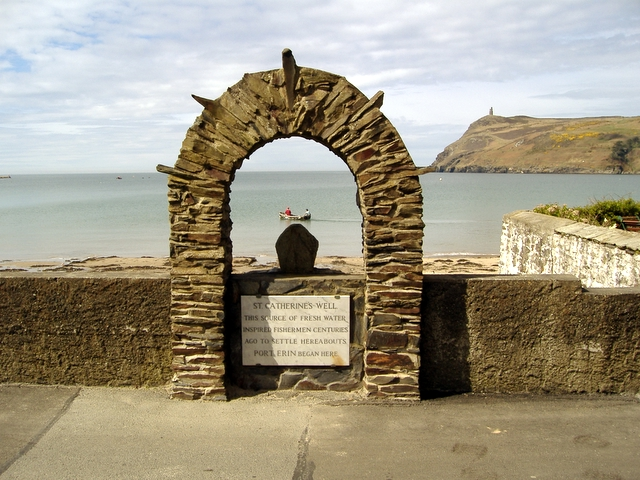
St Catherine's Well

- Population (2021 census) 3,730

Port Erin (census)
Year	1996	2001	2006	2011	2016	2021
Pop.	3,218	3,369	3,575	3,530	3,484	3,730
±%	—	+4.7%	+6.1%	−1.3%	−1.3%	+7.1%

- Adjacent village: Port St Mary
- Largest settlement by population in the south of the Island. Thus it has a higher population than Castletown, which has the status of a town.
- House of Keys constituency: Rushen (two seats)
- Sheading: Rushen

== Transport ==
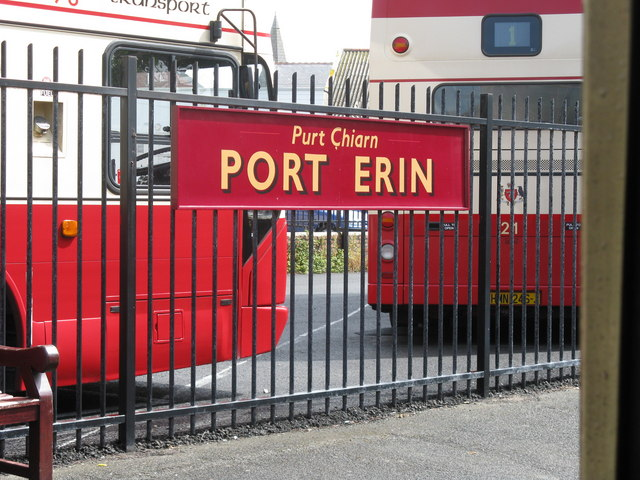
Bus Vannin Depot

=== Road ===
Port Erin is linked to the rest of the Island by three roads:

- A5 Shore Road (the coast road, as the name implies) east towards Castletown
- A7, the inland road leading east towards Ballabeg and Ballasalla
- A36, leading north through a sparsely populated area towards Foxdale and Glenmaye.

=== Railway ===
The steam railway station forms the western terminus of the Isle of Man Railway and sits in the centre of the village. The station is built of distinctive red Ruabon brick in an unusual design specifically to fit into its diagonal site between the platforms and the nearby road. The station is now a fraction of its original size, with the former bay platform and sidings now occupied by the storage yard for Bus Vannin, whilst an additional area once used for maintenance has been replaced by The Haven public house. More recent developments have seen the platform shortened and a carriage shed constructed in the yard, capable of storing eight carriages. Prior to this the rolling stock was stored in the open.

=== Buses ===
Bus services operate directly via a stop outside the village's railway station to the Island's capital Douglas via Port St Mary, Colby, Castletown, Ronaldsway Airport and Ballasalla, using route numbers 1, 2, 11 and 12; these run about every twenty minutes on weekdays and Saturdays, with a less frequent service on Sundays and after 6.00pm. Some of these services (1c and 11b) use an alternative coastal route. The route is the Island's busiest, partly because it calls at the Island's airport. A late evening service also operates on Friday and Saturday evenings, called the Night Owl (Hullaid Oie), which charges higher fares. There are also occasional buses to Peel (Service No. 8) via Foxdale; all these buses are within the Island's transport network Bus Vannin, a government-run service which replaced the railway-operated Isle Of Man Road Services in 1976, itself a subsidiary of the railway.

=== Other ===
There is a coach park to the rear of the railway station, formerly occupied by Tours (Isle Of Man) Limited, though more often used by visiting coaches in recent times. A number of private taxi services operate from the village into the later hours, though other Douglas-based hackneys will serve the south on demand.

== Geography ==
The beach is sandy and is on a bay bounded by two headlands which (on windy days) funnel the prevailing westerly wind towards the village. On sunny days, the bay acts as a suntrap. To the north of the promenade is Bradda Glen, one of the Manx National Glens. The northern headland, Bradda Head, has an iconic memorial tower called Milner's Tower. The promenade, on the east side of the bay, is somewhat higher than the seafront, and primarily consists of hotels, mostly built in the Victorian era, although due to changes in taste among tourists, many of these are being converted into flats and apartments. The town is famed for its views, including spectacular sunsets over Port Erin Bay and Bradda Head, as well as glimpses of the Mourne Mountains in Northern Ireland in the distance.

== Religion ==
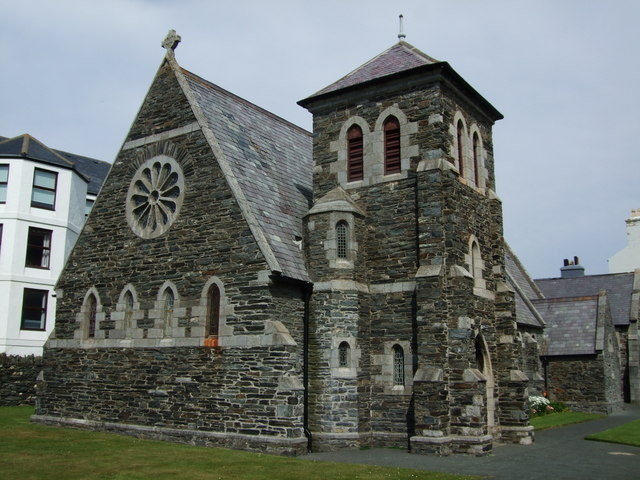
St Catherine's Church Church Road

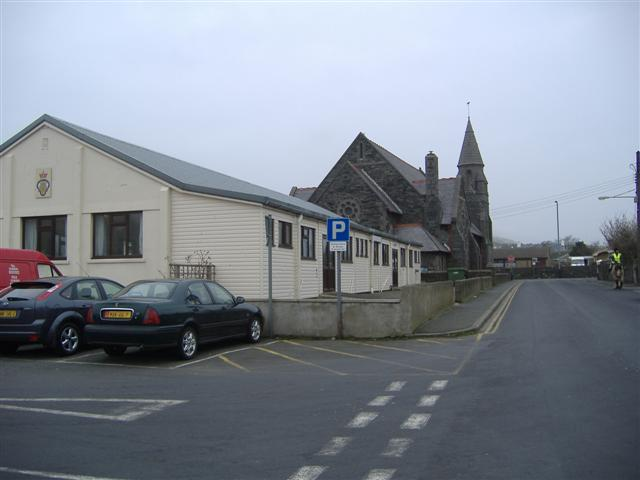
Methodist Church (Background) Droghadfayle Road

=== Church of England ===
The largest church in the village is dedicated to St Catherine and located on Church Road at its junction with the upper promenade and lies within its own grounds. The church was built in 1880 with funds donated by local locksmith William Milner. In addition to regular community services the church is also well known for its summer concert series that runs on a Wednesday evening throughout the summer months from May to September, featuring local talent.

=== Methodist ===
This church is at the junction of Droghadfayle Road with the main road entering the village, and has a mid-sized, modern built community hall annexed to it which hosts the Over Sixties club regularly in addition to services. To the rear of the church lies the village's branch of the Royal British Legion in the same cluster of buildings.

=== Grace Baptist ===
Constructed in 1980 at the same time and in a similar architectural style to a surrounding housing estate, this church began life in neighbouring Castletown before relocating and expanding its current headquarters in 1985; since this time the building has also been modified and expanded subject to demand.

=== Catholic ===
Found on the outskirts of the village on the main road to Port St Mary, another modern build small church with its own parking area; it can be found at the same site as the community gospel church. It is dedicated to St Columba and was built in 1923 to replace a temporary chapel on the shore line beneath the Bellevue Hotel previously used as a marine biology station and converted to a chapel in 1903. In 1989 the building was extended and re-orientated to provide a larger church with a church hall.

=== Free Presbyterian ===
Located at the same site as the Catholic Church, this is a further modern-build small church. It was founded in 1991 and later came under the auspices of the Free Presbyterian Church of Ulster. This is one of the only churches in the Island which continues to use exclusively the King James Version of the Bible. It is titled as Port Erin Gospel Church and has an emphasis on evangelism with people travelling over from Ulster regularly to oversee the work.

== Landmarks ==
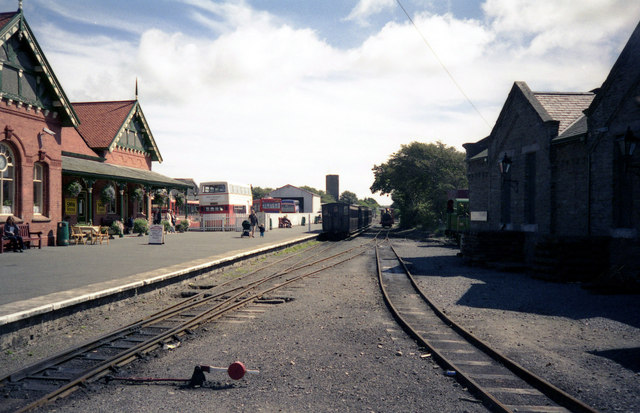
The Railway Station

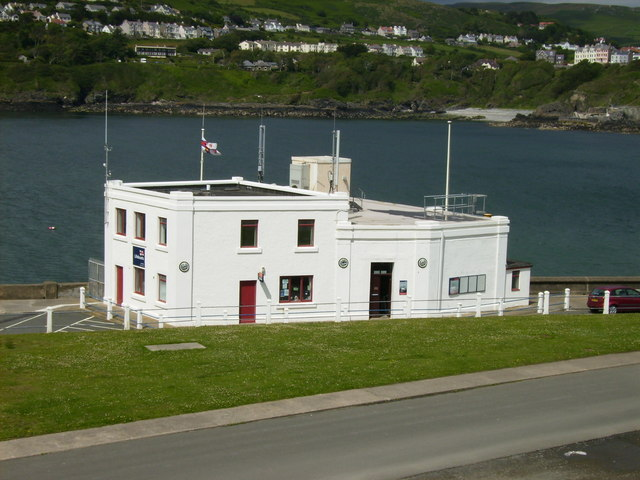
Lifeboat Station

- Fish Hatchery, a building (formerly a fish hatchery) in the outer harbour close to the wrecked breakwater. This was home to a University of Liverpool Marine Biology department which closed in 2006.
- Milner's Tower, a distinctive key-shaped building that stands on top of Bradda Head, a memorial to a locksmith, only reachable on foot. It features on the village's crest and coat of arms.
- Railway Museum, in the centre of the village and housed in the former bus garage of Isle of Man Road Services; open seasonally whenever the railway is in operation and accessible via the main road.
- Museum Building, originally constructed as a cinema but more recently used as office space and retail accommodation.
- Erin Arts Centre in a converted church on Victoria Square. The building is host to annual musical competitions and often to other events; it is one of several small centres for the arts in the Island.
- Railway station in the centre of the village and built of distinctive red Ruabon brick. Open seasonally; winner of an Ian Allan Heritage Award in 1991.
- Herdman House, now a private residence but built as the village's public library and gaming room, it at one time included a billiard hall and extensive library section before conversion to its present use.
- Collinson's Cafe, an unusual building which is currently empty; it has several unusual architectural features including a rotunda and a large sprung dance floor from its time as a dance hall. It is above the promenade on the road leading to the golf course.
- Lifeboat Station, on the south side of Port Erin Bay. Extended in recent years, it retains its slipway and deco architectural style, and is open to the public when staffed.
- Police Station, closed in 2014. The closest staffed police station is in Castletown. A public desk is located here.
- White Cottage, or Christians Cottage, was built by the Christian family on Shore Road in 1781. Above the door is a plaque that says: "Edmund and Margaret Christian, 1781". The Christian family still own the cottage today and it remains the oldest building in the village.
- Kishtey Çheh, a beach spa with sauna, hot tub and cold plunge pool on the beach at the Cosy Nook.

== Notable people ==
- Agnes Herbert (1873–1960), travel writer and big game hunter, grew up in Port Erin
- Mark Jones (born 1980), racing driver, grew up in Port Erin
- Ruth Keggin (born 1989), singer-songwriter
- Nigel Mansell (born 1953) Formula 1 racing driver, was one of the more famous residents during most of his F1 career when he lived on the headland to the north of the bay. He left in 1995.
- Leonard McCombe (1923–2015), photographer, grew up in Port Erin
- Brianne West (born 1987/1988), environmentalist and businesswoman, born in Port Erin

== Films ==
The 2006 film Stormbreaker, starring Ewan McGregor, was filmed on Port Erin beach; the village has also been used by various production companies including the BBC whose serialised drama The Ginger Tree was filmed at the railway station in 1989, and the cinematic adaptation of Five Children & It. An episode of the BBC documentary marking 20 years since the end of steam trains in the UK, The Train Now Departing, filmed extensive scenes in and around the station, interviewing the station master. The village has also featured in the holiday series Wish You Were Here...? and Holiday '91 with Judith Chalmers. In 2011 an episode of the British TV documentary Coast was filmed here. They also filmed in the White Cottage front garden.

== See also ==
- Bradda Head
- Port Erin railway station
- Isle of Man Railway Museum
- Latour-de-France – twin village
