= Bradda Field =

Canadian–British novelist (1893–1957)

- Born: Violet Elsie Bradda Field; February 1893; Nanaimo, British Columbia, Canada
- Died: 4 February 1957 (aged 63–64); Winchmore Hill, London, England
- Occupation: Novelist
- Mother: Agnes Herbert

Violet Elsie Bradda Field (February 1893 – 4 February 1957) was a Canadian–British novelist. She is best known for her novels The Earthen Lot (1928), which marked the beginning of her long publishing relationship with Constable, and Miledi (1941), a historical biography of Emma, Lady Hamilton that was selected as a "Book of the Month" by the Literary Guild. In 1933, she received the Femina–Vie Heureuse Prize for her novel Small Town. Field was noted for bypassing literary agents in favor of direct dealings with publishers, a practice she inherited from her mother, the travel writer Agnes Herbert.

== Biography ==
Violet Elsie Bradda Field was born to British travel writer Agnes Herbert and her husband William George Herbert Field in February 1893. She was born in Nanaimo, British Columbia, Canada. She was named after Bradda Head on the Isle of Man. She was considered Anglo–Canadian, having been born in Canada, but raised in Manchester.

Field's first known manuscript, If We Could Wait, was submitted unsuccessfully to the Bodley Head around 1925. She later submitted another manuscript, The Earthen Lot, to Chatto & Windus, before receiving a publishing offer from Constable. Her debut novel, The Earthen Lot, was published by Constable in 1928, beginning a publishing relationship that continued until 1942. Field took an active role in the publication of her works, negotiating royalties, overseeing binding and cover designs, and directing the distribution of review copies. She avoided using professional agents, preferring to deal directly with publishers, a practice influenced by her mother, Agnes Herbert. In 1933, Field won the Femina–Vie Heureuse Prize for her novel Small Town.

In addition to her first novel, Field wrote the historical work Miledi between 1934 and 1941. The book, which recounted the life of Emma, Lady Hamilton, was published in 1941 and selected as a "Book of the Month" by the Literary Guild in the United States, where it was released under the title Bride of Glory. Despite a large print run, its financial success was curtailed by the collapse of Greystone Press, which managed U.S. distribution. Field later remarked that she did not rely on writing for her livelihood and that her income was sufficient for her modest needs. Following Miledi, she did not publish another novel, citing poor health, the destruction of her home during the Blitz, and disillusionment with publishing setbacks. She died at her home in Winchmore Hill on 4 February 1957.
