= Latour-de-France =

Latour-de-France Triniac (Occitan)
- Commune
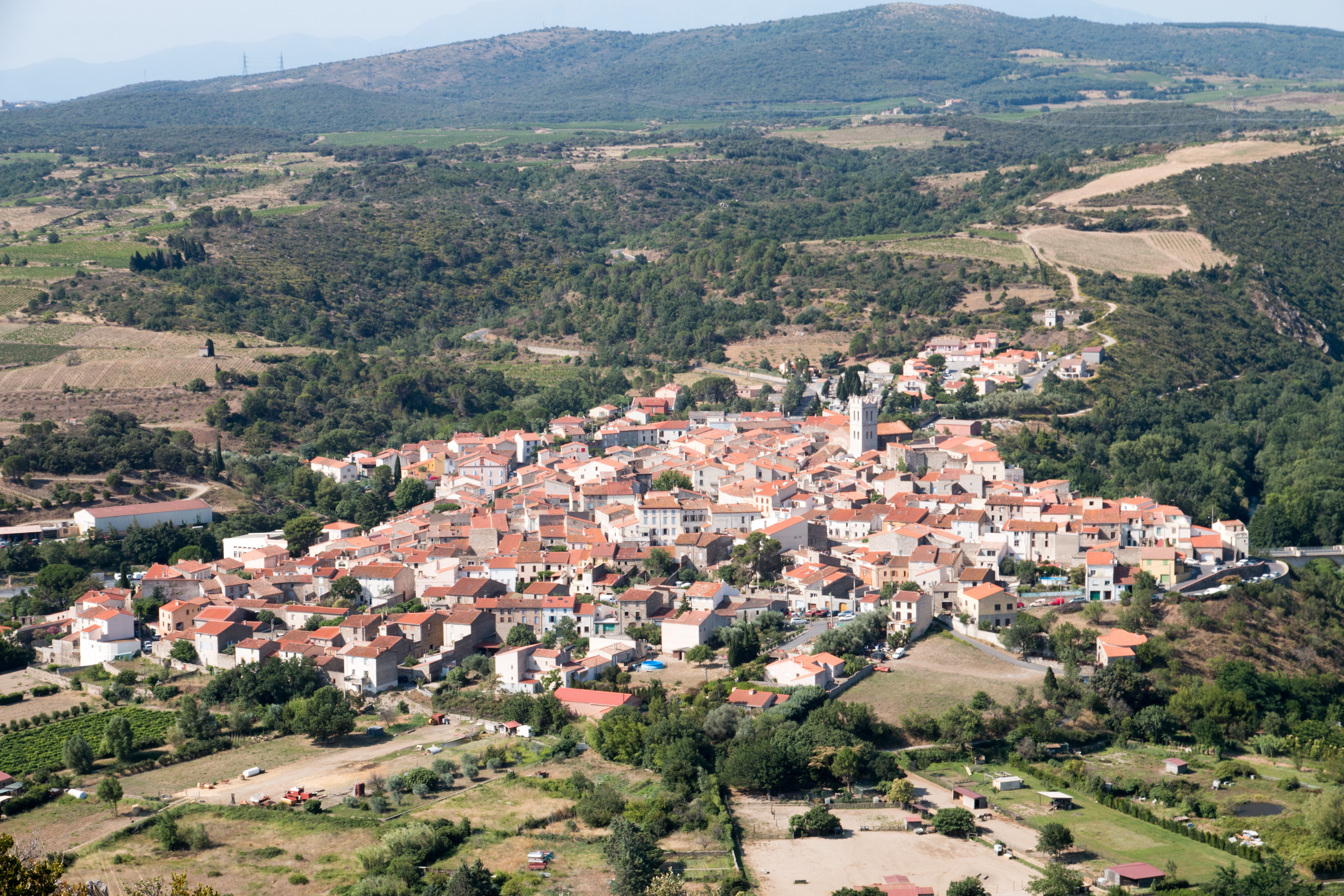
- Photograph looking south-west towards the village of Latour-de-France.

- Coat of arms
- Location of Latour-de-France
- Location within France Location within Occitanie
- Coordinates: 42°46′10″N 2°39′14″E
- Country: France
- Region: Occitania
- Department: Pyrénées-Orientales
- Arrondissement: Prades
- Canton: La Vallée de l'Agly
- Intercommunality: Agly Fenouillèdes

Government
  - Mayor (2020–2026): Marc Carles
- Area^{1}: 13.94 km^{2} (5.38 sq mi)
- Elevation: 85 m (279 ft)
- Highest elevation: 422 m (1,385 ft)
- Lowest elevation: 77 m (253 ft)
- Population (2023): 1,043
  - Density: 74.82/km^{2} (193.8/sq mi)
- Time zone: UTC+01:00 (CET)
  - Summer (DST): UTC+02:00 (CEST)
- INSEE/Postal code: 66096 /66720
- ^{1} French Land Register data, which excludes lakes, ponds, glaciers > 1 km^{2} (0.386 sq mi or 247 acres) and river estuaries.

Latour-de-France (French pronunciation: [latuʁ də fʁɑ̃s]; Occitan: Triniac) is a commune in the Pyrénées-Orientales department in southern France.

Latour de France is situated by the original frontier between France and Catalonia. Its military significance ended with the Treaty of the Pyrenees peace between Louis XIV of France and Philip IV of Spain that ended the Franco-Spanish War of 1648–59 but is still evinced in street names such as place de l’hôpital and place d’Armes.

This village of approximately 1,000 inhabitants has its own Appellation Contrôlée associated with the forward-looking cave co-operative, a garage, pharmacy, post office, primary school, bakers, two restaurant / bars, a small grocery store and a blacksmith. There are two tennis courts, a skate park (new in 2018), a children's playground, and several locations used by petanque enthusiasts. At its perimeter, there is a mix of ancient and modern while the old central village is a labyrinth of narrow streets.

Thirty years ago, in common with many villages, there were a fair number of derelict properties. These have virtually disappeared having been renovated for the most part by local families. Latour de France is now home to a growing number of foreign residents including families from Belgium, the United Kingdom, Germany and Norway.

There are many well-mapped walking and biking trails through the vineyards with points of interest such as derelict chapels and mines, along with views of the mountains.

The village is twinned with Port Erin in the Isle of Man.

== Geography ==
Latour-de-France is located in the canton of La Vallée de l'Agly and in the arrondissement of Perpignan.

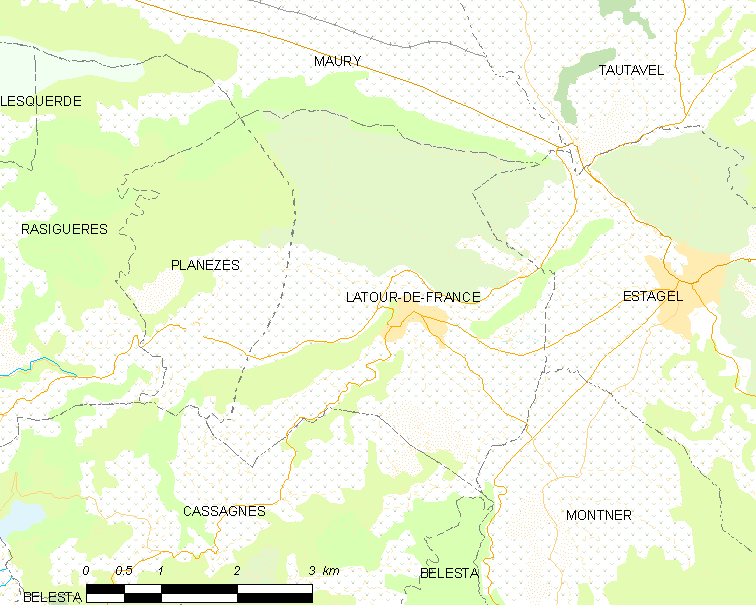
Map of Latour-de-France and its surrounding communes

== Toponymy ==
Latour-de-France is called Triniac or la Torre de Fenolhedés or la Torre de França in Occitan.

The first known name is Turris Triniago in 1020 (tower of Triniach). The name Tor de Fenolledés (la Torre de Fenolhedés) appears in 1423 (tower of the Fenouillèdes). This name will remain until the 18th century. La Tour de France appears in 1750 and is the name used today.

== Population ==
Historical population
Year	Pop.	±% p.a.
1968	1,047	—
1975	1,019	−0.39%
1982	1,078	+0.81%
1990	833	−3.17%
1999	885	+0.68%
2007	1,052	+2.18%
2012	1,064	+0.23%
2017	1,026	−0.72%
2023	1,043	+0.27%
Source: INSEE

== Sites of interest ==
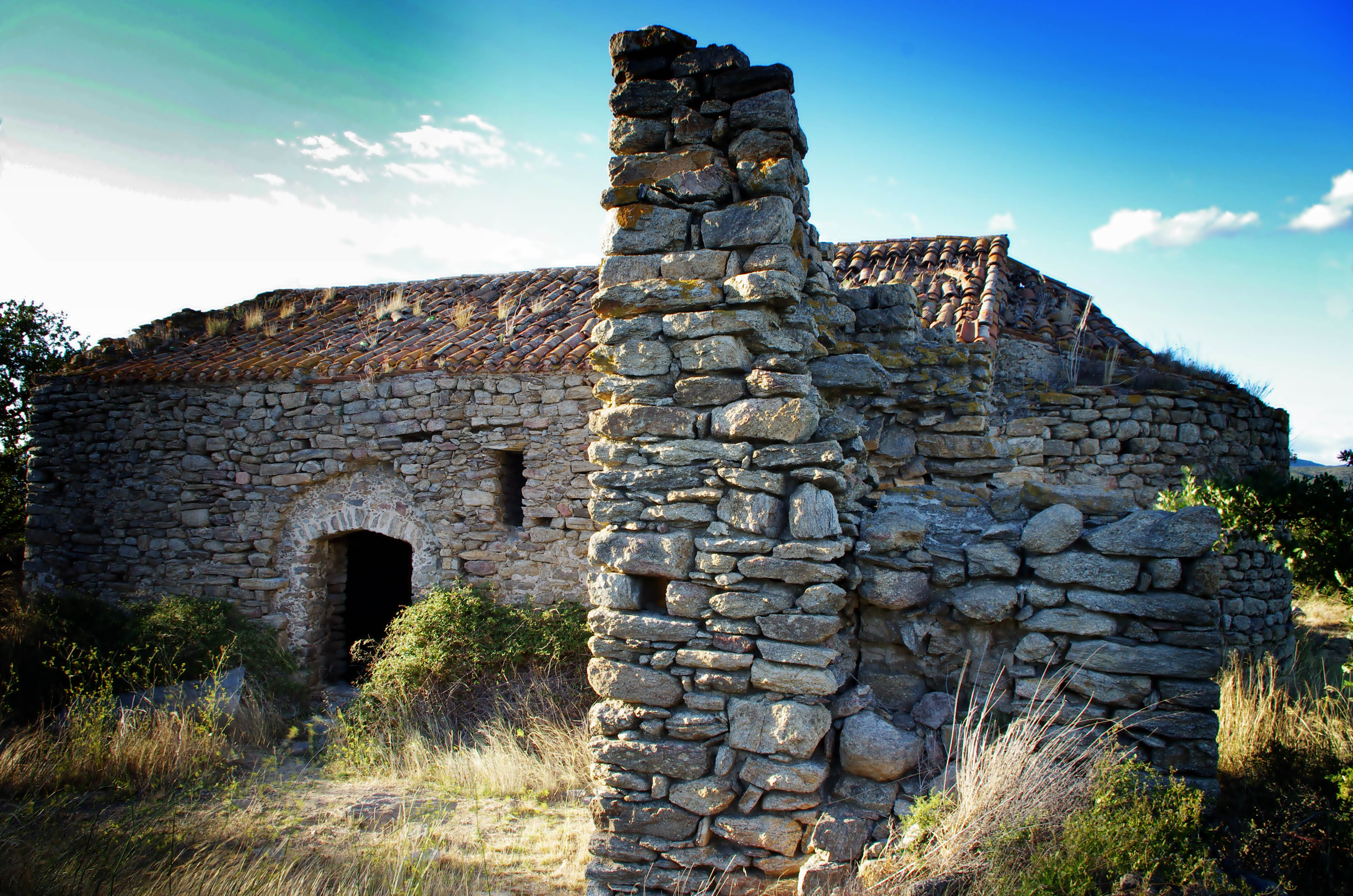
Saint Martin chapel

The village is dominated by a castle which has its origins in the 11th century, but most of the present structure is from the 16th and 17th centuries. It stands at the highest point of the village, perched on a hill overlooking three valleys.

- Saint Martin chapel, from the 13th century.

== See also ==
- Communes of the Pyrénées-Orientales department
