= Jersey Maritime Museum =

Museum in Jersey, Channel Islands

Coordinates: 49.1816°N 2.1098°W

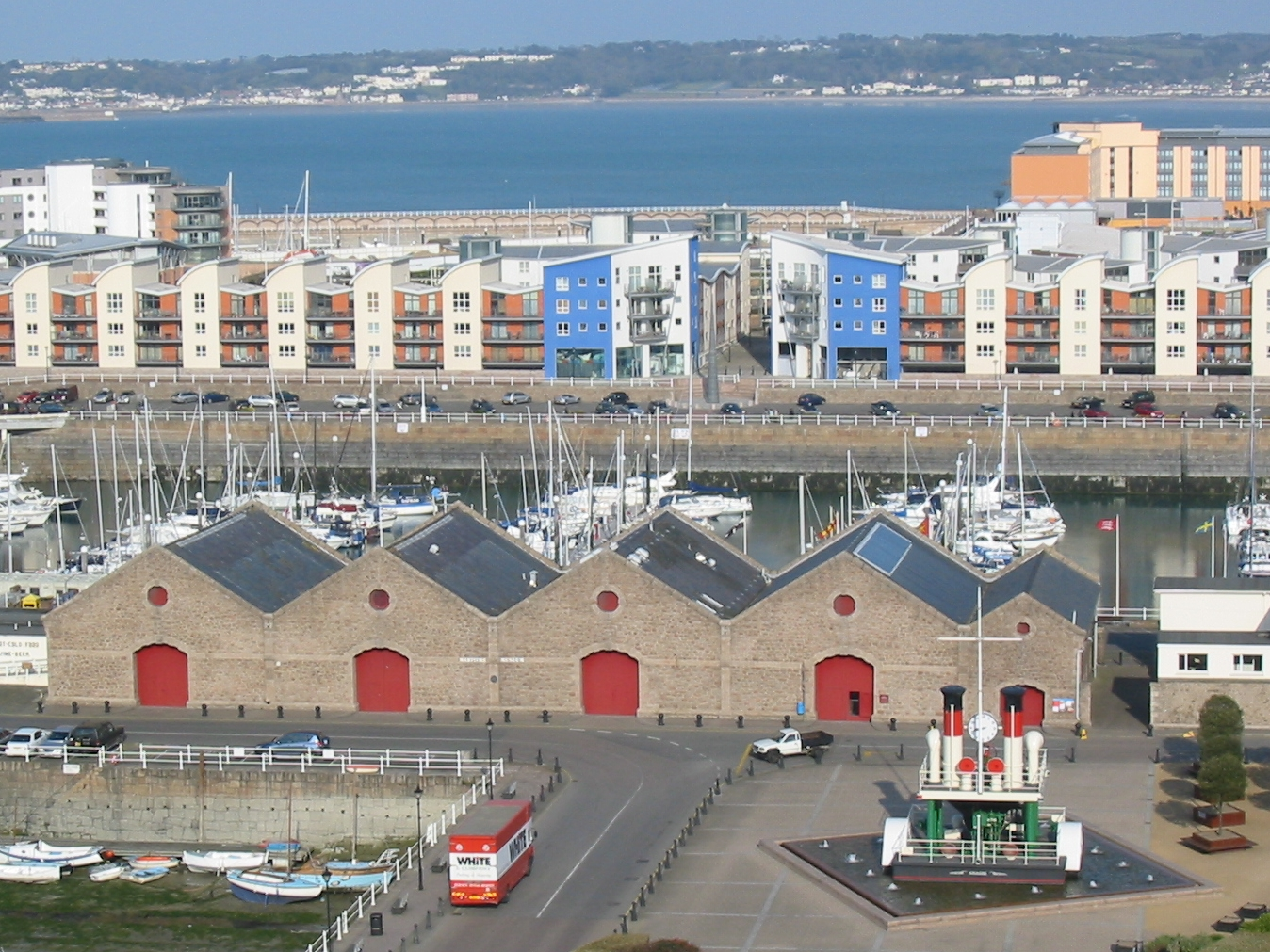
Exterior

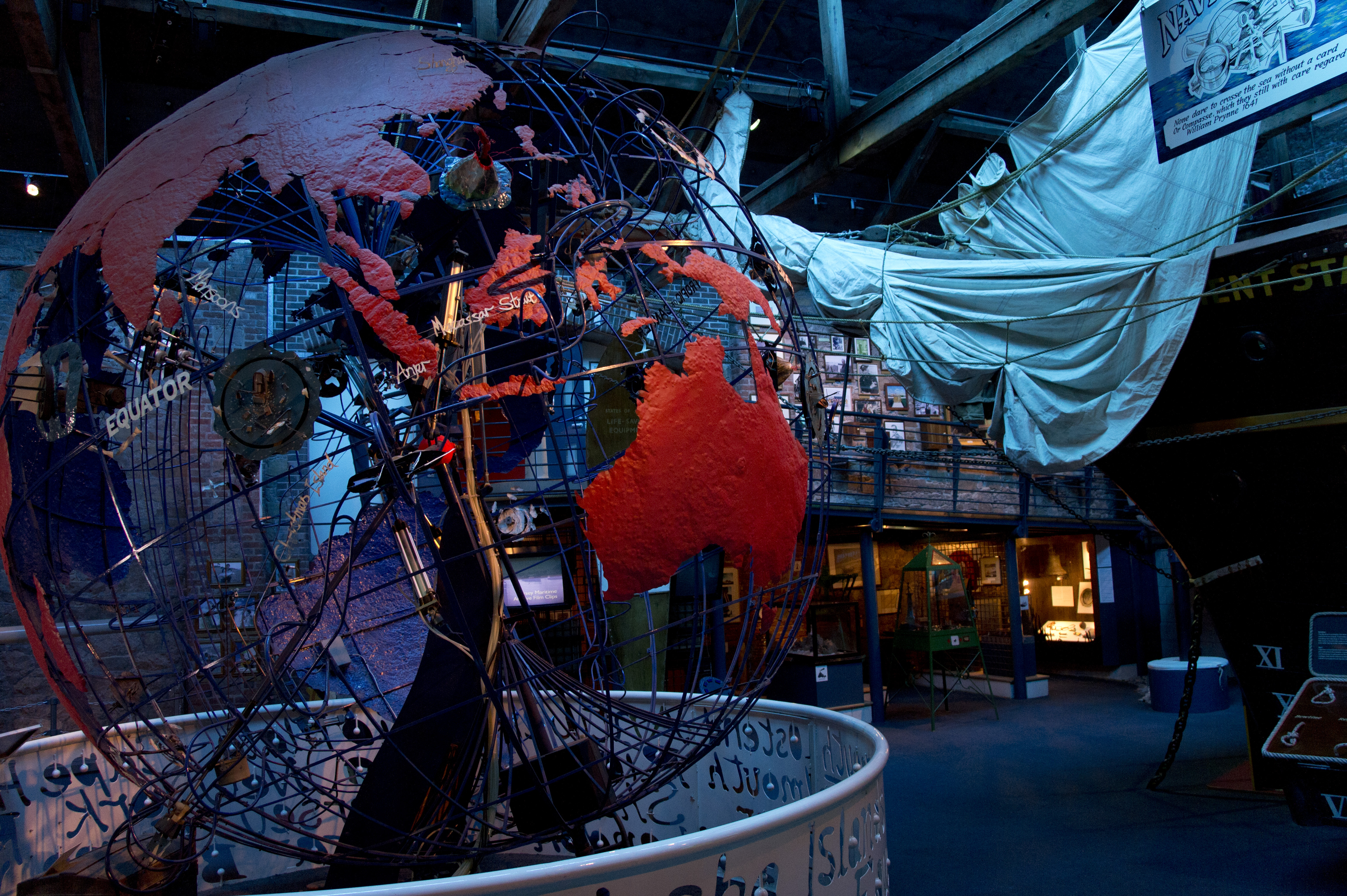
Interior displays

The Maritime Museum is located in Saint Helier, Jersey in the Channel Islands. It is housed in a set of five 19th-century warehouses and was opened in 1997. The collection includes artefacts from the island's maritime industry as well as from piracy and the 1692 Battles of Barfleur and La Hougue. The museum houses the Occupation Tapestry a 1988-1994 work created by islanders to depict life under the 1940-1945 German occupation.

== Description and history ==
The museum is sited in a set of five linked warehouses on the New North Pier in Saint Helier. The pier was constructed in the 1880s as part of a redevelopment of the harbour by the States of Jersey. The warehouses were built, for let, in 1889. After the liberation of the island from German occupation in 1945 the warehouses housed the harbour's customs and maintenance teams. They were empty by the 1970's, owing to changes in harbour practices with the coming of containerisation. The pier was converted to a marina from 1980. The warehouses were occupied from 1992 by the Friends of the Maritime Museum group. The museum was established in the warehouses after it was decided to use them to house the Occupation Tapestry, after the 50th anniversary of liberation.

In 1996 a memorial was erected outside of the museum buildings to Channel Islanders who died after being deported to Europe by the Germans. The museum formally opened in 1997. Its collection covers the island's fishing and ship-building industries, its mercantile operations and piracy. The collection includes artefacts recovered from the burnt wrecks of some of French Admiral Anne Hilarion de Tourville's fleet from the 1692 Battles of Barfleur and La Hougue.

== Occupation tapestry ==
In 1988 it was decided that a tapestry should be completed on the island to commemorate the 50th anniversary of liberation in 1995. The work was designed by Wayne Audrain in the style of the 1960s-70s Overlord Embroidery in Portsmouth. but as a tapestry. Originally it was to be a single panel piece but the work was later expanded to encompass twelve panels. These would be completed by residents of the island's twelve parishes and each would depict a different aspect of life during the occupation.

The panels each measure 6 by 3 feet (1.83 m × 0.91 m). German soldiers feature prominently in the work, appearing on eleven of the panels. The tapestry was the largest community art project ever undertaken in Jersey, with thousands of islanders helping to stitch the panels. The work used 275 shades of wool and required around 7.5 million stitches, with each panel taking around 2,500 man-hours.

The tapestry was completed in 1994 and on 9 May 1995 was unveiled by Prince Charles. The work was displayed in the Jersey Museum and Art Gallery for around a year, before being moved to a dedicated gallery at the Maritime Museum, where it remains. In 2015 work was started on a thirteenth panel of the tapestry, as part of celebrations for the 70th anniversary of liberation. This panel now hangs with the original tapestry in the gallery of the Maritime Museum.

== Awards ==
The Maritime Museum has been awarded National Heritage Museum of the Year twice, once in 1993 along with the Jersey Museum and Art Gallery, and once in 1998, along with House of Manannan on the Isle of Man.
