= Edward Kelly (painter) =

English painter

Edward Kelly (born 1946) is a contemporary English painter.

He was born in Liverpool, England, in 1946. He studied at Liverpool College of Art between 1963 and 1967, during which time he studied in Italy under a John Moores Travel Scholarship. He took a Higher Diploma at Birmingham College of Art between 1967 and 1968 and taught at Chelsea College of Art from 1974 to 1996.

Moments, 2012, Acrylic on canvas

His solo exhibitions include the Bootle Art Gallery, Liverpool (1969), the Camden Arts Centre, London (1982), Air Gallery, London (1985), Kapil Jariwala Gallery, London (1987, 1991), Arts in Mann Gallery, Isle of Man (1991), Smith Janwala Gallery, London (1994), Courtyard, Hereford (2005), Martin's Gallery, Cheltenham (2006), House of Manannan and Manx Museum, Isle of Man (2012), Artwave West, and Dorset (2012). Edward Kelly's painting Sea Cross is in the collection of the National Gallery of the Isle of Man.

Sea Cross, Acrylic on canvas

In 1969 he exhibited with Sylvia Goth at the Bluecoat Gallery, Liverpool, as a John Moores scholar. In 1980 he exhibited with Simon Willis at Bedford Way Gallery in London. From 1999 to 2001 he exhibited in group shows at Culture Gallery, Broadway, New York. In 2012 he filmed an interview with playwright Peter Terson, excerpts of which were screened at the British Film Institute.

Ken Kiff praised his "hard won images" in 1987.

== Environmental campaigner ==
Edward Kelly moved from London to an Area of Outstanding Natural Beauty in the Wye Valley in the mid 1980s. During the late 1990s increasing trend towards the use of agricultural polytunnels came to dominate the landscape in some parts of the Wye Valley, and in particular near the artist's residence. He launched the Campaign for Polytunnel Control which seeks that erection of polytunnels should be controlled by planning permission, owing to their massive scale and visual impact. In relation to the campaign Edward Kelly has been interviewed by national press and has appeared in national newspapers and on TV and presented at various government hearings and government reports.

He was portrayed as a character in Pentabus Theatre Company's play "Strawberry Fields" that dealt with the issues associated with migrant workers in industrial scale strawberry farms.
