= Scapa Flow Museum =

War museum in Orkney, Scotland

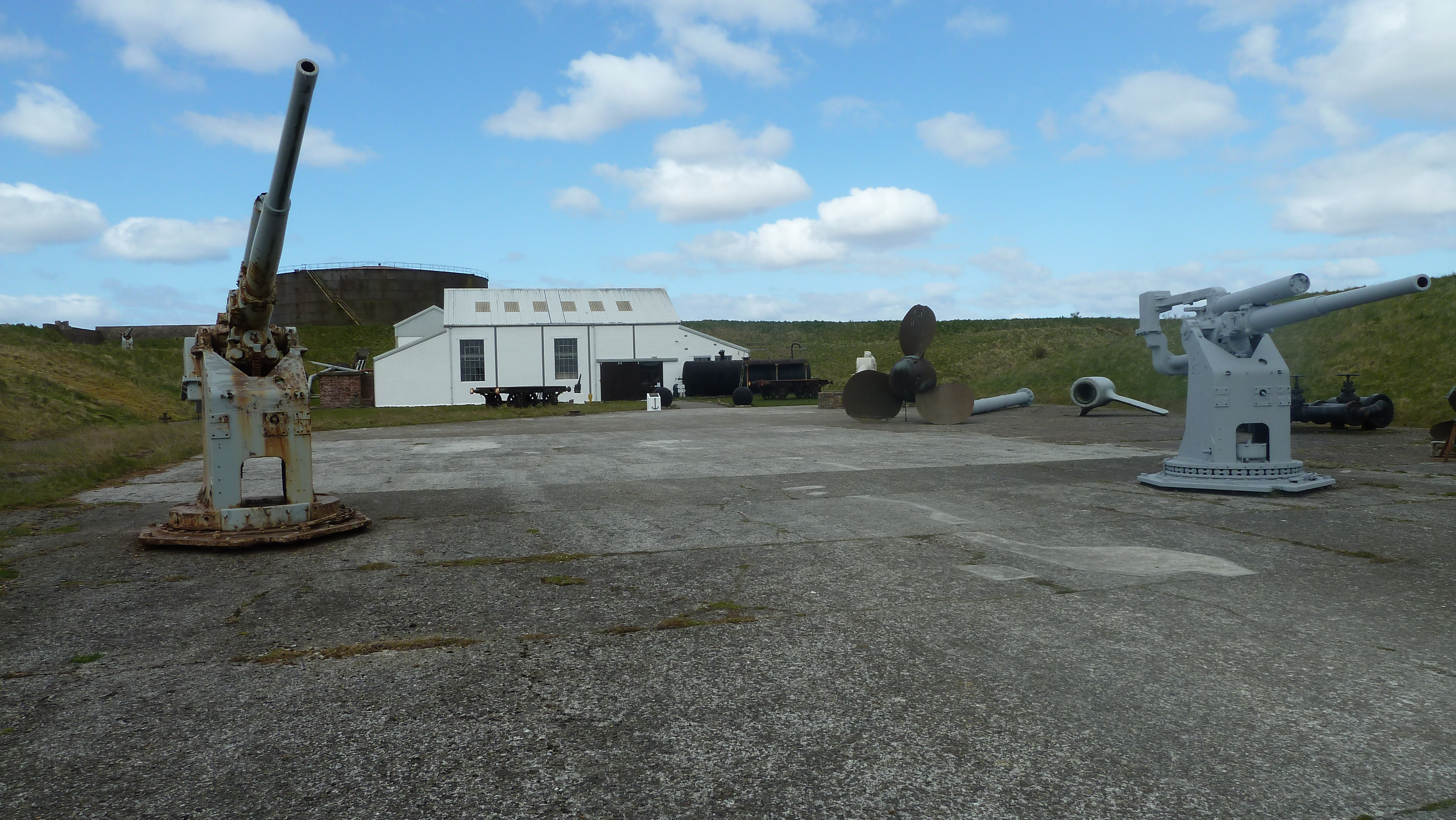
- Former name: Scapa Flow Visitor Centre
- Established: 1990; 36 years ago
- Location: Lyness, Orkney
- Coordinates: 58°50′02″N 3°11′49″W
- Type: War Museum
- Website: https://www.orkneymuseums.co.uk/our-museums/scapa-flow-museum/

Scapa Flow Museum is a war museum in Lyness on the Island of Hoy, Orkney, Scotland. Housed within a refurbished Romney hut and oil fuel pump house at the former Lyness royal naval base HMS Proserpine, the museum charts the history of Orkney's involvement in World War I and World War II. The museum is named after the body of water to the east of Hoy, Scapa Flow, which was the Royal Navy's chief naval base during both world wars.

The museum originally opened in 1990, and became part of Orkney Islands Council's Museums Service in 2000. The museum closed in 2017, and reopened to the public after a £4.4-million refurbishment in July 2022. Scapa Flow Museum was shortlisted for the Art Fund Museum of the Year Award in 2023.

== Collections ==
The museum includes displays of 250 artefacts and objects which help tell the stories of significant sea battles, including the Battle of Jutland; the loss of Royal Navy ships, such as the HMS Hampshire and HMS Royal Oak; and the scuttling of the German fleet after the end of the First World War.
