= Peel Town Hall =

Municipal building in Peel, Isle of Man

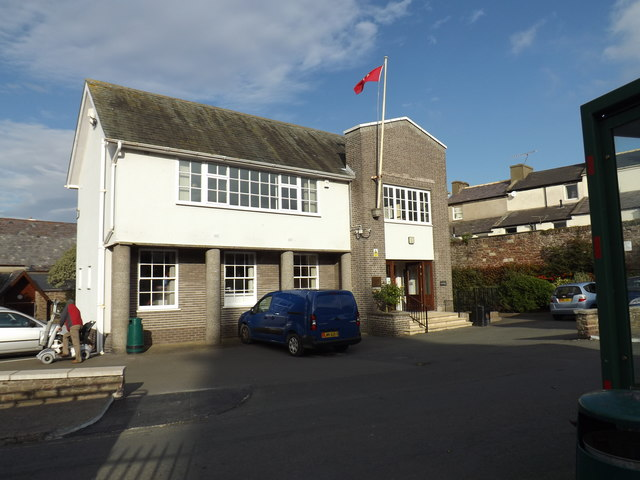
- The building in October 2015

- Shown in Isle of Man
- 54.2226°N 4.6908°W
- Location: Derby Road, Peel

History
- Built: 1958

Site notes
- Architectural style: Modern style

Peel Town Hall is a municipal building on Derby Road, Peel, Isle of Man. It accommodates the offices and meeting place of the Peel Town Commissioners.

== History ==
After significant population growth, largely associated with the seaside tourism industry, town commissioners were appointed in 1884. They subsequently established a small office at No. 26 Castle Street.

In July 1935, Eliza Katherine Corrin of Glenfaba House died leaving £50,000 in her will to the town for charitable and philanthropic purposes. Of this sum, £2,000 was allocated for the construction of a town hall and, after considering other bequests by the Corrin family, the cumulative sum available for the town hall was £5,000.

Limited progress was made on the development of a town hall over the next decade because of the intervention of the Second World War, but after the war the project was resurrected. In the early 1950s, the town clerk, Leslie Kelly, tabled proposals for a new town hall. The site the town commissioners selected was on the northeast side of Derby Road. The building was designed in the modern style, built in brown brick and was officially opened on 13 February 1958. The design involved an asymmetrical main frontage of four bays facing onto Derby Road. The left-hand section of three bays contained four columns which supported the first-floor structure which was slightly projected forward, faced in stucco and fenestrated by a wide casement window. The right-hand bay, which was further projected forward, featured a short flight of steps leading up to a doorway. There was a casement window on the first floor and a gable above. A flagpole was attached to the brickwork on the left of the window on the first floor. Internally, the principal room was the board room for meetings of the commissioners.

Large public meetings were held at the Corrin Memorial Church Hall on the opposite side of Derby Road. When the lieutenant governor of the island, Sir Ronald Garvey, visited Peel, in October 1959, the meeting was held at the Corrin Memorial Church Hall, rather than in the town hall. (Note: The Corrin Memorial Church Hall pre-dates the town hall and was officially opened on 9 August 1923.)

Works of art in the town hall include two landscapes depicting local scenes by Charles Hugh Cook Wells, two landscapes depicting local scenes by J. M. Butterworth, a landscape depicting a local scene by John Miller Nicholson, and a painting entitled "the Diamond King" by John Holland. (Note: The Diamond King was Joseph Mylchreest, a Manxman who made his fortune diamond mining in South Africa.)
