= Odin's Raven =

Odin's Raven is a 2/3 scale replica of the Gokstad ship, which was sailed from Trondheim to Peel, Isle of Man, by a joint Manx and Norwegian crew. The project formed part of the 1979 Manx Millennium Celebrations, and was conceived and planned by local businessman Robin Bigland.

== Technical details ==
Odin's Raven is 50 ft (15 m) in length, 11 ft (3.4 m) beam, and 3 ft (0.91 m) draft to keel, (4 ft 6 in (1.37 m) draft to steering oar). She was built at Rød Båtbyggeri, Fredrikstad, Elingaardskilen, near the entrance to Oslofjord.

Technical advice was obtained from Alan Binns of Hull University, who sailed for the first half of the voyage; Eric Rudstrom, a fembøring sailor; and Rolf Hansen, who had extensive experience of sailing traditional square-rigged boats. She is clinker-built of oak with galvanised iron fasteners, and her frames are lashed in place with nylon cord. A 20 HP motor was provided for safety reasons, but rarely used. The boat was skippered by Eddie Kaighin.

Following sea trials on Oslofjord, Odin's Raven was shipped to Trondheim.

== Route of the voyage ==
Setting out from Trondheim on 27 May 1979, she was sailed by her crew of 16 via:

- Kjorsvik
- Ålesund
- Honingsvag
- Ninian Central Platform, Brent oilfield
- Lerwick
- Kirkwall
- Rousay
- Sule Skerry
- Sheshader Bay, Eye Peninsula, Isle of Lewis
- Stornoway, Isle of Lewis
- Portree, Skye (where the crew experienced a capsize during sailing evolutions for the camera)
- Kyle of Lochalsh
- Tobermory
- Oban
- Gulf of Corryvreckan
- Port Ellen, Islay (where she was met by HM Submarine Odin)
- Portpatrick, Mull of Galloway,

arriving at Peel, Isle of Man on 4 July 1979 (day before Tynwald Day).

As well as being followed by a film crew for BBC TV, the story of the project and the voyage was recorded in a book by Michael Ingram "The Voyage of Odin's Raven".

== Museum exhibit ==
Odin's Raven is displayed as a museum exhibit at the House of Manannan in Peel, in the former Peel railway station.
