= House of Manannan =

Museum in the Isle of Man

The House of Manannan
- Thie Vanannan
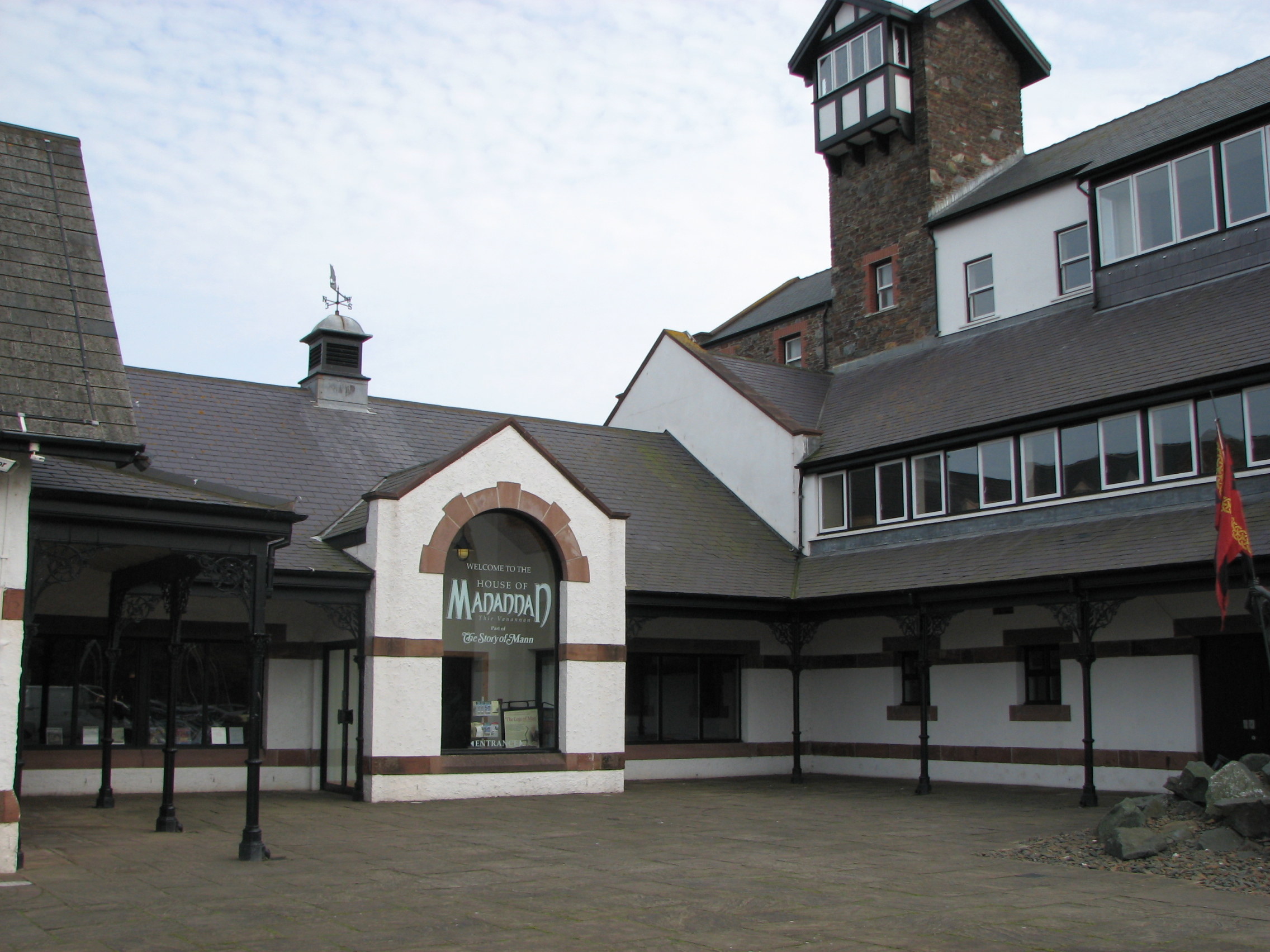
- House of Manannan building in Peel.

- Location of House of Manannan on the Isle of Man
- Established: 1997; 29 years ago
- Location: Mill Road, Peel, Isle of Man
- Coordinates: 54°13′18″N 4°41′51″W

The House of Manannan is a museum in Peel in the Isle of Man. It is named after the "great mythological sea god" Manannan and covers the island's Celtic, Viking, and Maritime history.

== History ==
The museum is located in the former Peel railway station. The original building was built in 1873 and closed in September 1968 with the closure of the Peel line between Douglas and Peel. In 1979 it was used to house Odin's Raven. In 1997 the building was then repurposed and expanded to suit the needs of the museum at a cost of £5.5 million.

In 1998, the museum was awarded National Heritage Museum of the Year, an award shared with the Jersey Maritime Museum in St Helier.

In recent years, the museum has sadly fallen into disrepair due to lack of maintenance and investment.

== Exhibitions ==
The museum has several permanent exhibitions depicting the Celtic period of the Isle of Man to the modern era, such as a life size reconstruction of a Celtic roundhouse, as well as other attractions based from the 19th century, like a replication of a Peel street. Sea stories are also shared with visitors.

One of its most notable attractions is Odin's Raven, a recreation of a Viking longboat in two-thirds scale. Odin's Raven was made in Norway and then sailed to Peel, arriving on 4 July 1979 as part of the High Court of Tynwald's millennium celebrations.

Apart from the permanent exhibitions, several temporary themed exhibitions are shown in the exhibition gallery each year. Artists such as Edward Kelly have had their work exhibited in the gallery. Other exhibitions have included This Is Christmas which focuses on the celebration of Christmas during the 1950s to 1970s on the Isle of Man.

== Facilities ==
The museum also has a gift shop and a café. There is limited parking behind the museum.

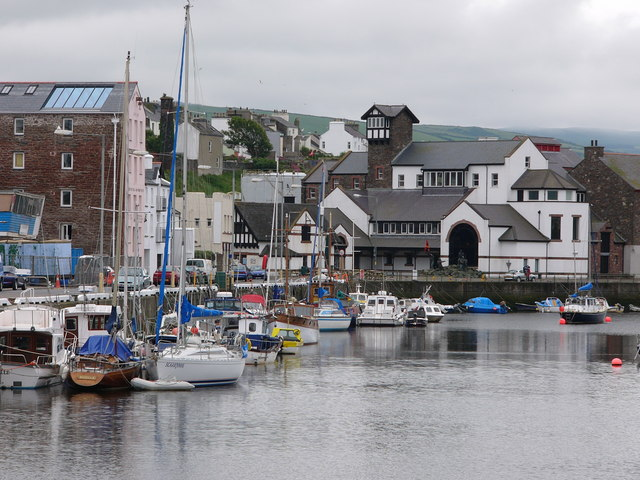
Peel Harbour and the House of Manannan.
