= Peel Marina =

Marina in the Isle of Man

Coordinates: 54°13′21″N 04°41′55″W

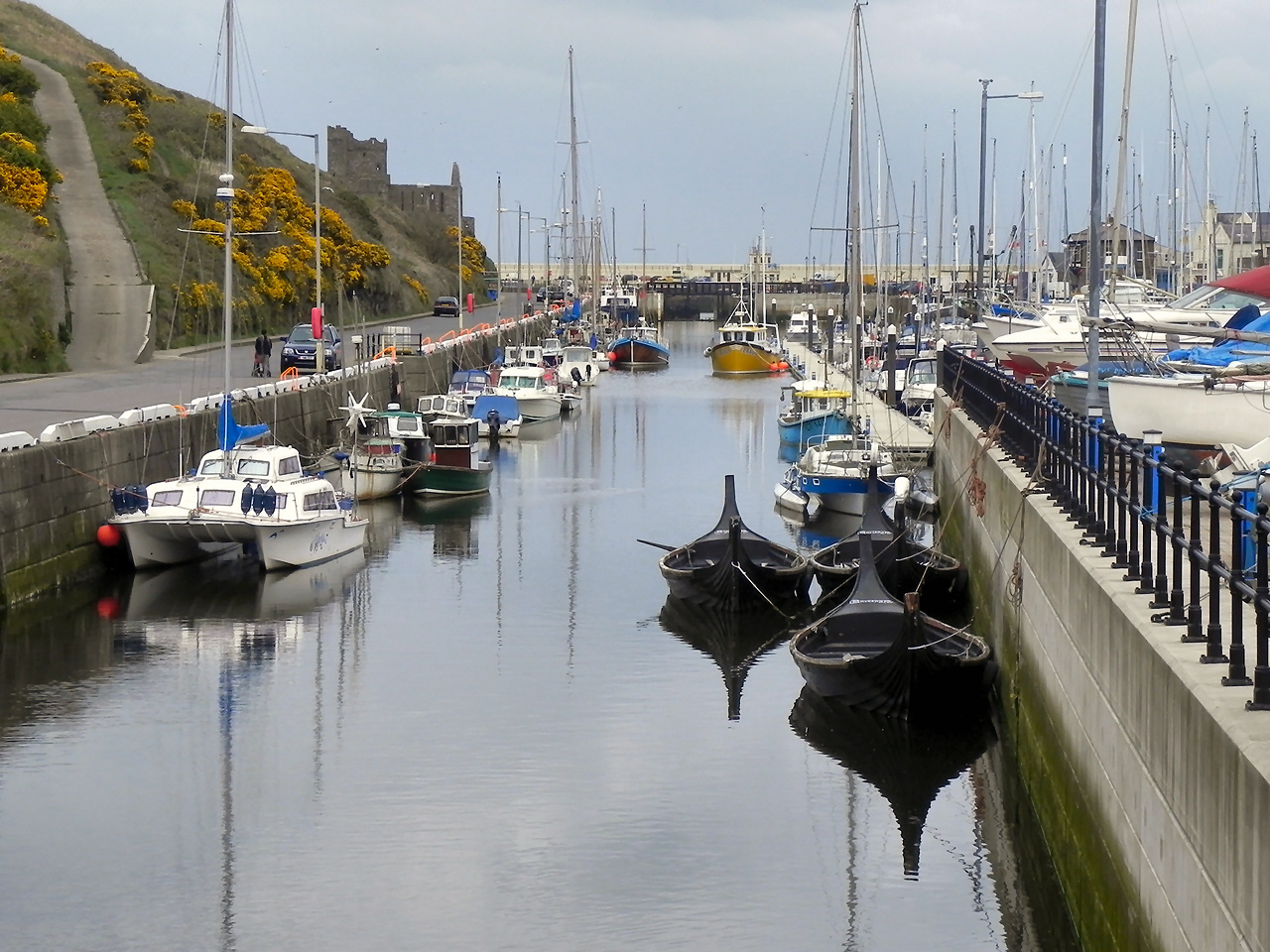
Peel Marina in 2011

Peel Marina is a marina at Peel Harbour in the town of Peel, Isle of Man. It was constructed in 2009 as an expansion of Peel Harbour. Since construction, the site has had continuous issues with silt buildup and toxic materials contamination.

== History ==
Peel Harbour is a port in the Isle of Man. In 2005 it underwent renovations with a new water retention scheme. Despite this, the harbour was seen as too small for its purpose as it had a waiting list of 118 requests for mooring berths. Peel Marina was proposed as the resolution by the Manx Department of Transport at a cost of £3.1 million. The proposal was voted for by the Tynwald. The proposal was approved and viewed as a regeneration of the harbour area.

Shortly after construction, the marina started to become bogged down with buildup of silt in 2011. The dredging of the marina to fix the issue did not take place until 2015, when 18,000 tonnes (18,000 long tons; 20,000 short tons) of silt were removed from the site to Poortown Quarry in German Parish, despite local residents objecting on the grounds that the silt was "potentially hazardous waste".

The works were justified by the Department of Infrastructure on the grounds that the silt was blocking berths, and because the Isle of Man government could not afford to close the marina, which earned them £30,000 per annum. In 2018, a new bridge was constructed over the marina to replace the main bridge used to access Peel Castle. After concerns were raised by residents over the resulting spillage, a public meeting was called by German Parish Commissioners hoping to engender a viable solution. In 2020, the marina again became bogged with silt, this time contaminated with toxic cadmium. 44,000 tonnes (43,000 long tons; 49,000 short tons) of silt were due to be removed to a temporary silt lagoon set up by the Isle of Man government. The dredging works will be split between 2020 and 2021 to ensure continued access to the berths in the marina.
