= Bradda Head =

Rugged headland in the south-west of the Isle of Man, in the British Isles,

Coordinates: 54.0924°N 4.7778°W

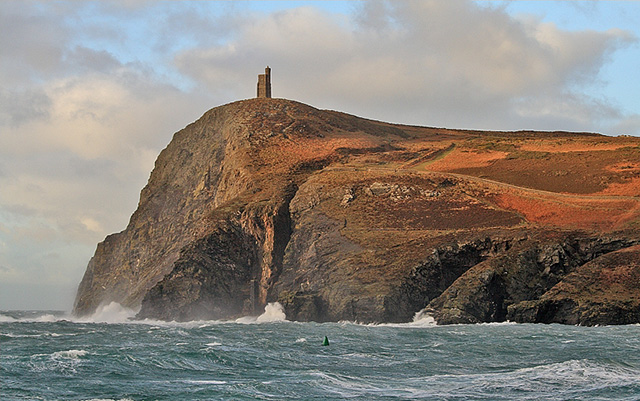
Milner's Tower, seen here from Port Erin Bay, stands prominently on Bradda Head which juts into the Irish Sea.

Bradda Head is a rugged headland overlooking Port Erin, a popular seaside village in the south-west of the Isle of Man, in the British Isles. It rises to a height of 382 feet (116 m) above sea level.

Milner's Tower was built in 1871 in memory of William Milner of the Milner's Safe Co. Ltd., maker of fire-resistant safes, and a local philanthropist. The tower is built in the shape of a key and lock (as viewed from above).

The headland and Milner's Tower are accessible via Bradda Glen, on the Port Erin to Peel section of the Isle of Man coastal footpath, Raad ny Foillan (Manx Gaelic for 'Way of the Gull'). Views from Bradda Head include the Calf of Man to the south and the Mourne Mountains of Northern Ireland and the east coast of the Republic of Ireland to the west.

== History ==
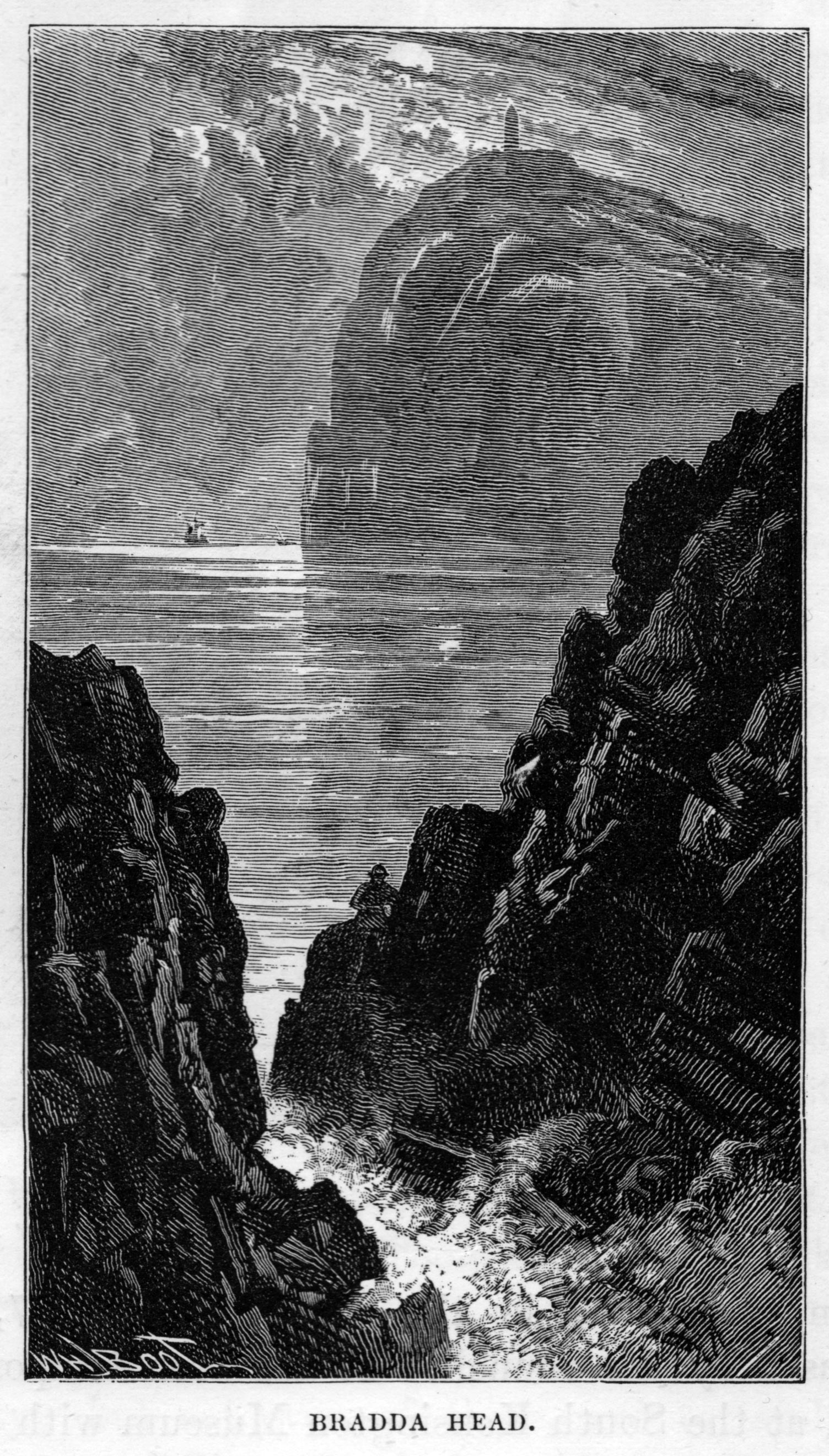
Bradda Head in an engraving by W. H. J. Boot, circa 1880

Most of Bradda Head's history relates to mining. There are several veins close to the surface; they reach several hundred fathoms into the headland and below sea level. There is evidence of copper ore and lead being extracted from on and near the surface during the Bronze Age, and further into the ground via shafts during the 13th century. By the early 1700s and into the 1800s, deep shafts were being excavated horizontally and below sea level. Most access was via steep slopes or steps carved into the cliff faces. Remains of the Captain's house and pump house are low down the rock face on the southern face, visible from the sea. Mining continued until 1904.

There is an ancient cairn on nearby Bradda Hill. An ancient coin hoard was found at Bradda Head in 1848. Prior to the Second World War, there was a thriving fishing trade in scallops taken off Bradda Head.

On 17 July 2023, a privately owned light aircraft crashed into the cliffside. The only casualty was the lone pilot.

== Contemporary uses ==
The site is popular with walkers, photographers and artists, and the 1931 "Kodak World's Best Photograph" was made here. C.W. Powell won £4,000 for the picture. The pathways and headland make it a popular location for walkers, bird and sea life spotters. Due to rock falls and erosion, there are caves and tunnels under the headland that can be negotiated by kayakers, paddleboarders, freedivers and scuba divers.
