= Peel, Isle of Man =

Town on the Isle of Man

Coordinates: 54.221°N 4.691°W

Peel: Manx: Purt ny h-Inshey
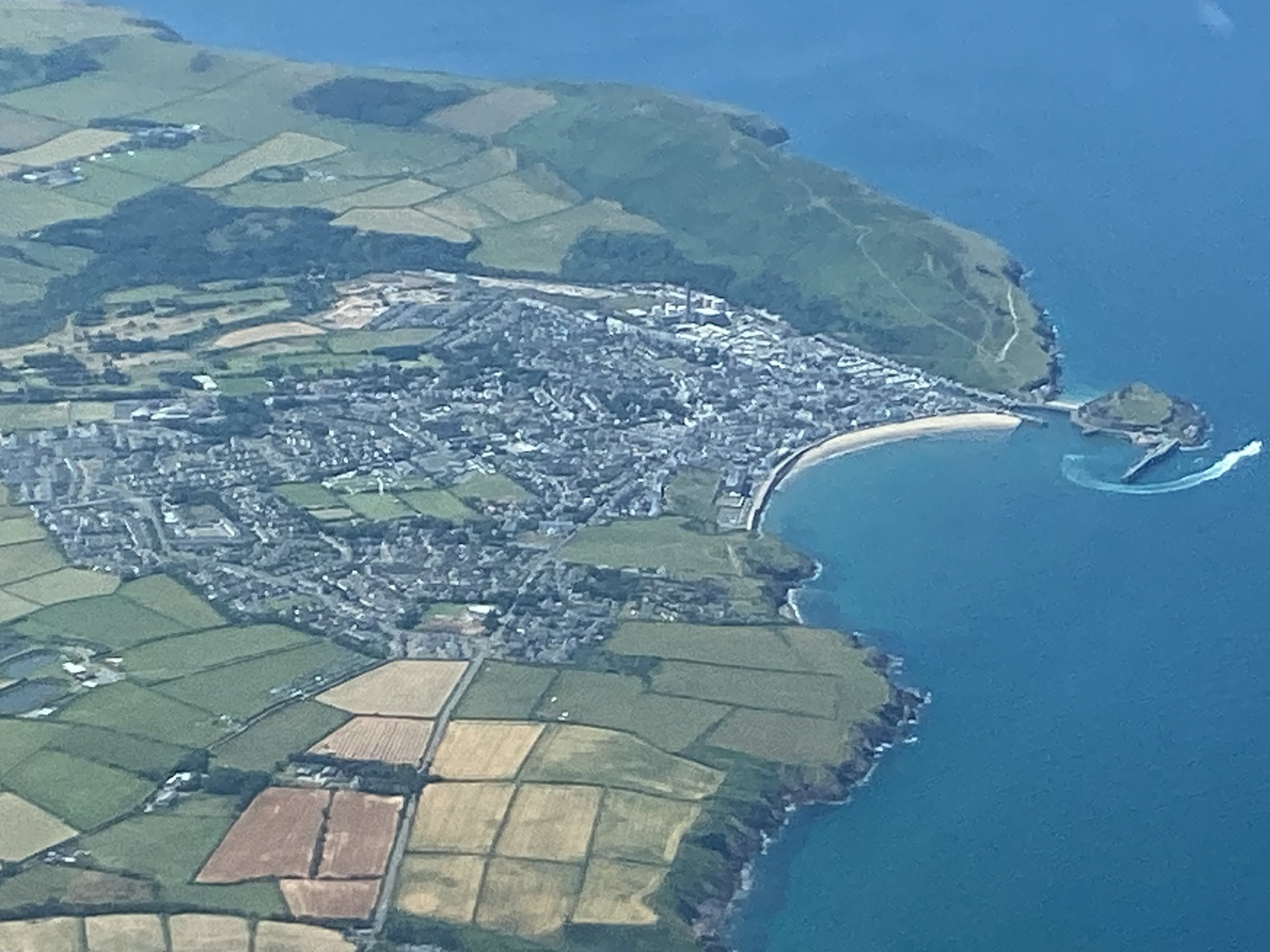
- Peel town from the air

- Location within the Isle of Man
- Population: 5,710 (2021 census)
- OS grid reference: SC246839
  - Douglas: 11 miles (18 km)
- Parish: German
- Sheading: Glenfaba
- Crown dependency: Isle of Man
- Post town: ISLE OF MAN
- Postcode district: IM5
- Police: Isle of Man
- Fire: Isle of Man
- Ambulance: Isle of Man
- House of Keys: Glenfaba & Peel
- Website: Peel Online

Peel (Manx: Purt ny h-Inshey 'port of the Island') is a seaside town and small fishing port in the Isle of Man, in the historic parish of German but administered separately. Peel is the second largest town in the Island after Ramsey. However, it is the fourth largest settlement because the larger settlements of Douglas and Onchan are classed as a City and a Village, respectively.

Until 2016 (when it was merged with Glenfaba) Peel was also a House of Keys constituency, electing one Member of the House of Keys (MHK), who, since September 2015, is Ray Harmer.

Peel has a ruined castle on St Patrick's Isle, and a cathedral, seat of the Diocese of Sodor and Man (the diocese was founded when Mann was ruled by the Norse).

== Name ==
The English name for the town, Peel, means 'palisade, fortification' comes from Middle English peel ~ pele, ultimately from Latin pālus 'stake'. It is a shortened version of the earlier Peeltown 'town of the fortification' in reference to Peel Castle. An earlier name for the settlement was Holmtown meaning 'Island town', <holm> coming from Old Norse holmr 'island', in reference to St Patrick's Isle, where Peel Castle is located. This is the same referent of the Manx name Purt ny h-Inshey 'harbour of the Island', sometimes Balley ny h-Inshey 'town of the Island'; inshey comes from the genitive of a hypothetical Manx *insh 'island' (related to Irish inis) and only appears in toponyms.

== Geography ==
Peel is on the west coast of the Isle of Man, on the east side of the mouth of the River Neb. To the north west is St Patrick's Isle, connected to the mainland by a causeway, and to the west across the river is Peel Hill. The A1 road connects Peel with Douglas. The A4 and A3 roads connect it with Kirk Michael and Ramsey. To the south of Peel is Castletown, the former capital of the Island, and to the SE is Douglas. Ireland to the west and Scotland to the north may be seen on a clear day.

The older part of Peel is built of reddish Peel Sandstone, mostly the original homes and businesses of fishermen and merchants with narrow winding lanes by the quayside. Before 1765, the town had a busy import-export trade importing goods from ports such as Amsterdam; in the mid to late 19th century the town was a busy fishing port.

== Demographics ==
The Isle of Man census 2016 lists the population as 5,374, an increase from 5,093 in 2011.

== Governance ==
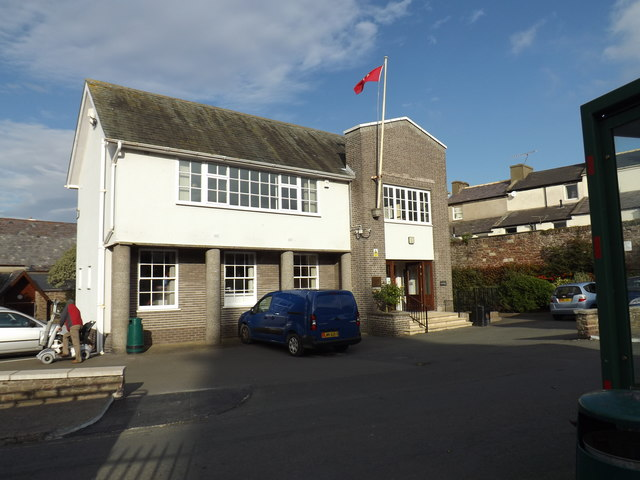
Peel Town Hall

The local authority is Peel Town Commissioners who are based at Peel Town Hall on Derby Road. There are nine commissioners. The day-to-day activities of the authority are run by the clerk.

== Town history ==
Peel was the capital of the Island before the King of Mann moved his home and military base from Peel Castle to Castle Rushen. The last King of Man, Magnús Óláfsson, is recorded in the Chronicle of Mann to have died at Rushen Castle in 1265.

Peel is the Island's main fishing port and Peel Cathedral is the seat of the Bishop of Sodor and Man.

Peel is sometimes referred to as the "rose red city", due to the red sandstone used to build the castle and other important buildings. As it is in the west, it is also called the "sunset city". Peel is a popular seaside destination for Manx residents and visitors in summer. It has narrow streets of fishermen's cottages and a Victorian promenade which was built on reclaimed land and a small construction line built for this purpose, as well as sandy beaches. For many years the main industries in the town were fishing, trading and shipbuilding.

There is evidence of local settlers in the Mesolithic Age on both St Patrick's Isle and the nearby Peel Hill, and Neolithic farmers are believed to have settled in the area.

About 550, a Celtic monastery was founded on St Patrick's Isle. Excavations in the 1980s found a large early Christian burial ground, many of the burials dating from around 550. Some later graves had Norse burial goods: e.g. the 'Pagan Lady'. The ruins of the original Peel Cathedral (c.1250) can be seen within the walls of Peel Castle on St Patrick's Isle. This replaced an earlier church.

Norsemen first came to Mann around the year 800, and ruled the Island for four-and-a-half centuries before finally ceding it to the King of Scotland in 1266. Norsemen settled in Peel and used the harbour on the River Neb as a shelter for their longships. In 1228 Olaf the Black, King of Mann and the Isles, beached his fleet in the inlet. It was attacked and burned by his half-brother Ragnald. In 1266, as agreed in the Treaty of Perth, Norway's King Magnus VI ceded the Isle of Man to Scotland. The Island came under English control in the 14th century.

The town of Peel developed on the east bank of the river and the settlement was known as Holmtown until the 17th century. Later development, apart from the late 19th century guest house building on the sea front, has been inland, away from the coast. The name Peel was given to the castle by the English rulers, and the settlement then became Peeltown until about 1860. By the time the local councils were established in 1883, the name Peel referred to the town rather than the castle. In the 19th century, schooners built in Peel traded around northwest Europe and Peel fishing boats fished around the Island and further afield to the southern coast of Ireland and near to Shetland. The harbour and breakwater were gradually improved, with much of the local income derived from the export of salted herring. By the 1880s, fishing was the main employer with about 3,000 men and boys employed, with ancillary businesses such as shipbuilding providing employment to hundreds more. However, with what is now seen as over-fishing, the number of boats leaving for Ireland dwindled from 300 in 1880 to a handful by 1915.

After the railway arrived in Peel in 1873, Peel started to develop as a tourist resort, with guest houses and hotels built along the shoreline and headlands, and then the promenade was added. Tourism gradually grew in the town. During World War I Knockaloe Farm, at Patrick to the south of the town, was made into the Knockaloe internment camp and housed up to 30,000 German, Austrian and Turkish civilians. In 1940, guest houses at one end of the promenade were requisitioned to become Peveril Internment Camp, housing those suspected of having sympathy for the Nazi regime under the UK's Defence Regulation 18B. By the late 1960s the Peel to Douglas railway line had closed and tourism declined. Fishing from Peel has seen periods of upturn and decline. For a number of years the annual Viking Festival has attracted visitors to the resort. In 1979 Odin's Raven, a replica of a Viking longship, sailed from Norway to Peel to commemorate the millennium of the legendary first sitting of the Isle of Man's Parliament, Tynwald. In 2005, a new floodgate was installed at Peel to retain the waters of the River Neb and thus enable the moored boats to float at low tide.

Peel is the birthplace of Peel microcars, made by the Peel Engineering Company in the 1960s, the only Manx cars ever built.

== Amenities ==
Peel has a campsite, swimming pool, tennis courts, BMX track, football ground, golf club, bowling green and various other amenities.

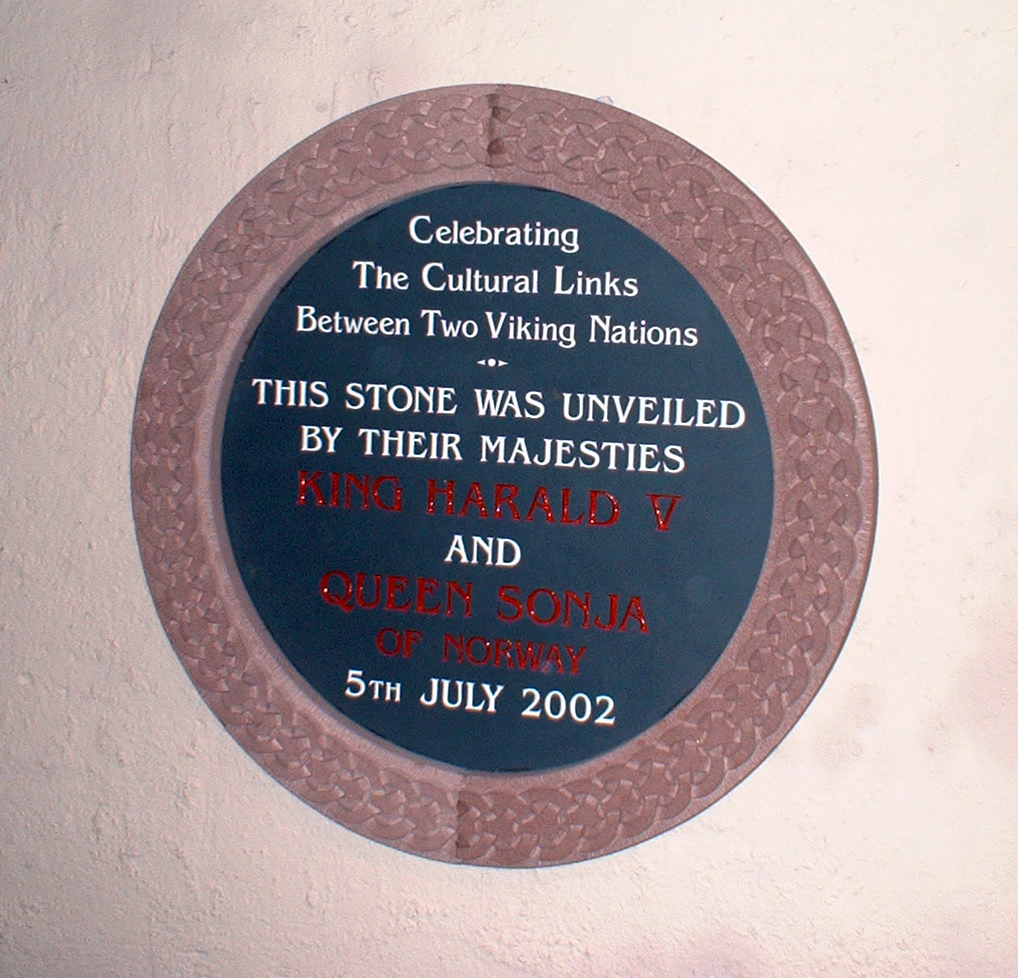
Memorial plate at House of Manannan in Peel, from King Harald V and Queen Sonja of Norway (2002)

=== House of Manannan Museum ===
The House of Manannan Museum was built in 1997, costing £5.5 million, partly new and partly in the old Peel railway station. The museum covers the past and present of the Island and houses Odin's Raven, a two-thirds scale replica of a Viking longship which had been built in and sailed from Norway, arriving on 4 July 1979 to celebrate the millennium of the High Court of Tynwald, the legislature of the Isle of Man.

=== Manx Transportation Museum ===
The Manx Transportation Museum, which opened in 2002, is housed in the former Brickworks building near the harbour.

=== Leece Museum ===
The Leece Museum was established in 1984 and relocated to the Old Courthouse building in East Quay in 2000. The museum is devoted to objects, photographs and documents specifically relating to the town. The museum now has a large display of TT and Manx Grand Prix racing bikes, on and off-road and vintage bikes along with memorabilia from the TT races.

=== Peel Castle ===
Peel Castle is on St Patrick's Isle, a small island connected to Peel Hill by a causeway. It is thought that the castle was started by Magnus Barelegs (King Magnus III of Norway, also known as Magnus Barefoot) and then extended in 1392 by William le Scrope, 1st Earl of Wiltshire. The castle is now a tourist attraction open in summer. There is a public footpath around the castle. Archaeological investigations have uncovered evidence of a cemetery dating to around AD 550, and Norse fortifications. The "Pagan Lady" burial discovered within the castle grounds was a Christian-style grave but with various grave goods in the Norse style, including a necklace of beads traded from various countries in Europe and the Mediterranean. No pagan Viking-age burial in the British Isles has produced grave goods of such high quality.

== Events ==
Regular events from spring to autumn based in Peel include: the Isle of Man Art Festival (WOSAT) in May; Peel Day during TT fortnight (May/June); Peel Secret Gardens (usually July); Yn Chruinnaght Inter-Celtic Festival (July); Peel Viking Longboat Races (July), and Peel Carnival.

== Kipper production ==
Kippers have been produced in Peel since at least the 19th century. Two kipper houses remain: Moore's Kipper Yard (established 1884) which provides tours of the factory demonstrating the preparation and smoking processes, and Devereau's (also established 1884).

== Peel Centenary Centre ==
Peel Centenary Centre (Manx: Ynnyd Keead-Blein) is an arts and community centre based at the Centenary Hall. It runs a programme of films, live concerts (local, British, and international acts), and other community events.

== Douglas to Peel railway line ==
Peel railway station opened on 1 July 1873, beside the harbour, as the western terminus of the Isle of Man Railway's Douglas to Peel line. The station closed to passengers on 7 September 1968. The station site is now a car park and boatyard, and the station building is used as part of the House of Manannan Museum. The former railway line is now a footpath and cycleway: the path is close to the main road and leads to St John's, from where it continues to Douglas, the Island's capital.

== Peel Harbour and Marina ==
Peel Harbour is the most active fishing port in the Isle of Man and is also used to import fuel oils. There is a fish and shellfish processing industry as well as the traditional art of kipper curing. The breakwater has deep-water berths with a lighthouse situated at the end. Fishing boats are usually berthed on the breakwater.

The castle overlooks the entrance to the inner harbour, which is tidal. However a water retention scheme was built in July 2005 with a jetty from East Quay toward West Quay with an automatically operated gate-flap and a pedestrian swing bridge above it. The gate-flap enables a half tide dock, similar to one at Douglas, and Padstow. As a result, in Peel, inner harbour boats remain afloat even at low water, whereas before boats would settle upon the hard or exposed seabed.

Yachts may be moored in Peel Marina, which was constructed in the inner harbour at a cost of £3.1 million. 124 new berths have been installed by reclaiming part of the top end of the harbour for a boat park, with construction of a new harbour office.

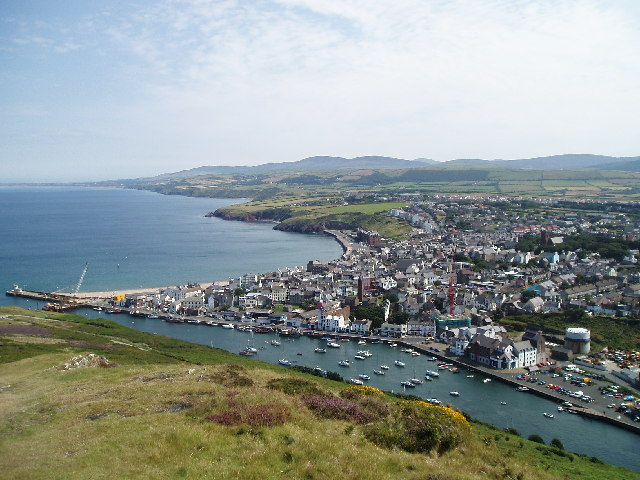
Peel town and harbour from the headland

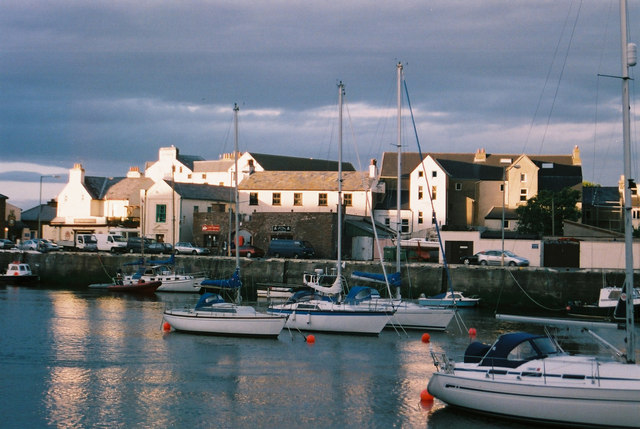
Evening at Peel harbour

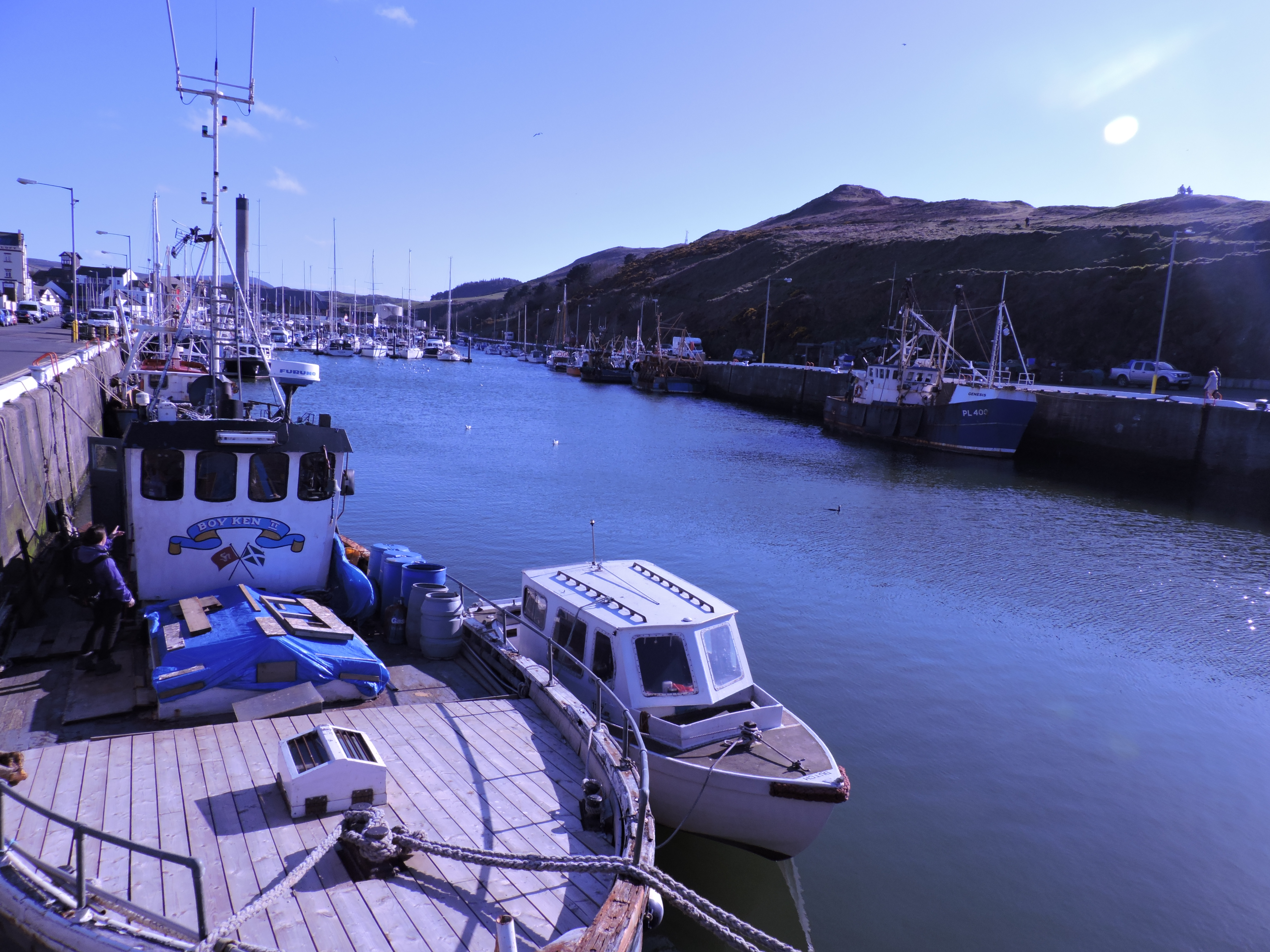
Peel harbour and headland

== Sport and recreation ==
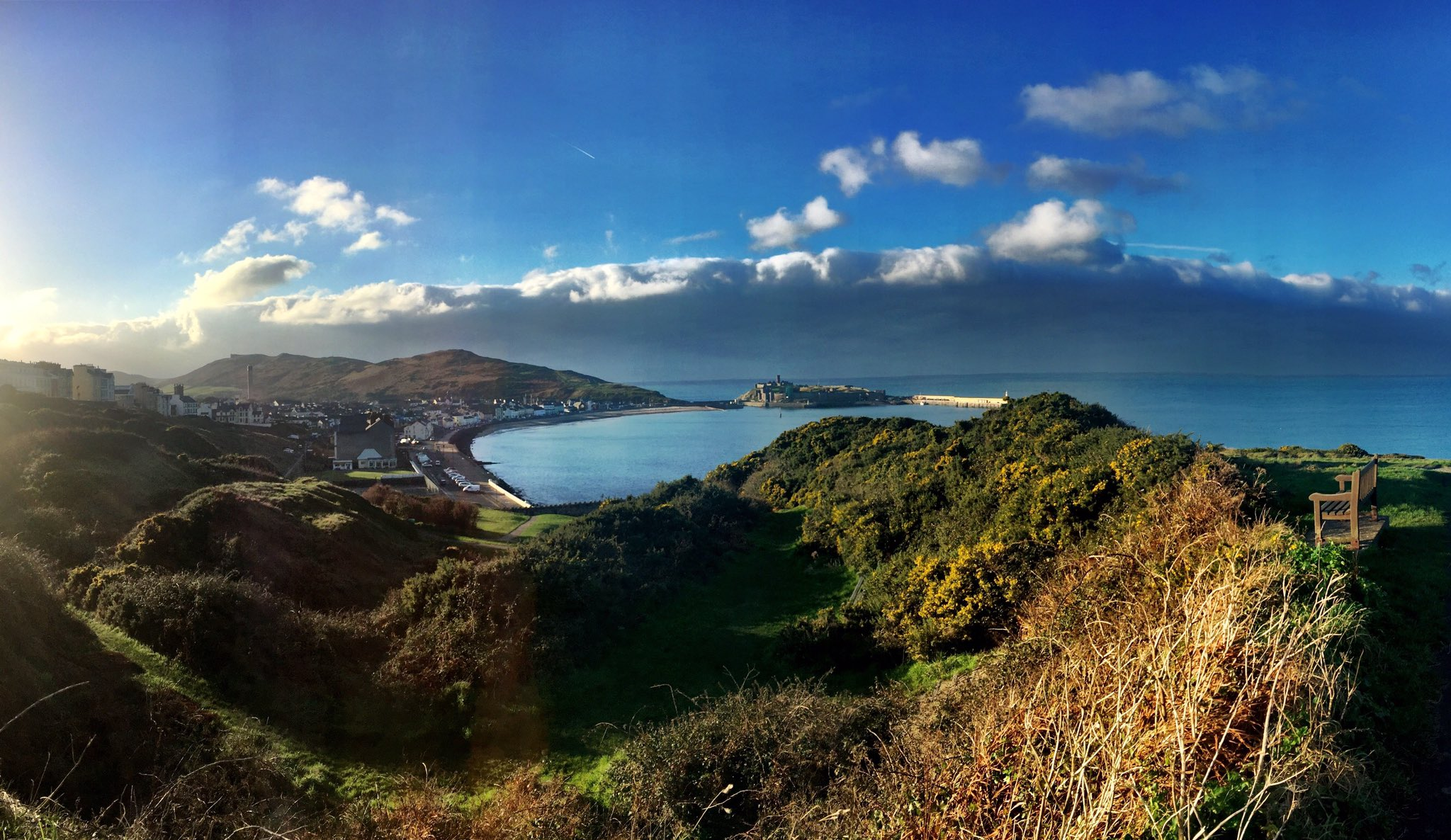
Peel from the headlands

Peel A.F.C., who compete in the Isle of Man Football League, are based in Peel. They play their home games at the Peel FC Football Ground, Douglas Road. Formed in 1888, they are the most successful club on the Island with 29 league titles and 32 victories in the Manx FA Cup. They were the first winners of the Isle of Man Football League in 1897. Peel Cricket Club are also based in the town, they are members of the Isle of Man Cricket Association.

Valkyrs Hockey Club play their home matches at the Queen Elizabeth II High School astro turf pitch. Peel Golf Club is an 18-hole golf course, totalling over 5870 yds off competitions tees, located on Rheast Lane which was established in 1895. The clubhouse was opened in 1977 by Peter Alliss. Western Athletics club is based at Queen Elizabeth II School. Western Swimming Pool is located on Derby Road.

The Headlands Field has a BMX track, football pitch, park and coastal pathway. There is also a telescope on the headlands which overlooks Peel promenade. The coastal path starts on the Headlands and leads all the way to Kirk Michael beach. Also on the Headlands is the park which has swings, climbing frames and exercise machines installed into it.

The Raad ny Foillan long distance coastal footpath opened in 1986 runs along the coast through Peel.

== Astronomy ==
Peel Castle/St Patrick's Isle is a Dark Skies astronomy site, meaning that there are low levels of light pollution, so that fainter night sky features such as the Milky Way may be seen on a clear night. Peel Head has been used as a vantage point for viewing the Northern Lights when conditions are favourable, as it has a clear and elevated view to the Northern horizon. Peel is well known for sunsets over the sea (hence its moniker "Sunset City"): sometimes these outline the Mourne Mountains in Northern Ireland, directly to the west of Peel.

== Wildlife ==
The seas by Peel are home to basking sharks in early summer. These sharks are seen occasionally from the land and more often from boats. Seals are often to be found around the breakwater by the castle. A variety of seabirds live and feed around the harbour, castle and headland.

== Religion ==
Peel Cathedral (the Cathedral Church of St German), built in 1884, became a cathedral in 1980. It is the cathedral church for the Anglican diocese of Sodor and Man and is located in the centre of the town. Just outside the cathedral are stone reproductions of a few of the many medieval Manx Celtic and Norse crosses. One of these is Thorwald's Cross which shows symbolism of both Christianity and the Norse myths. Another has runes down the side.

The ruins of the original Peel Cathedral (c. 1250) can be seen within the walls of Peel Castle on St Patrick's Isle. This replaced an earlier church.

Before Peel Castle was built on St Patrick's Isle, there was an early Celtic Christian religious community. Excavations in the 1980s found a large early Christian burial ground, many of the burials dating from around 550. Some later graves had Norse burial goods: e.g. the Pagan Lady.

Peel Elim Community Church holds meetings at the Philip Christian Centre.

Grace Baptist Church, founded in 1974 as an outreach of the Grace Baptist Church in Onchan, is located in the former Peel Mathematical School building. It was purchased in 1984 and renovated in 1997, and is listed as a "heritage building".

Peel Methodist Church is located in Athol Street. There have been a number of Methodist chapels in Peel. The first one was Shore Road Wesley Methodist Chapel, built in 1777. It was used as a fishing-net factory between the 1850s and 1870s, and is now the Peel Youth Centre. A Primitive Methodist Chapel was built on Kirk Michael Street in 1835. It became a public hall when the Christian Street Chapel opened and is now used, after much redevelopment, as a showroom. Peel Centenary Wesley Methodist Chapel was built in 1839 on Athol Street. Peel Primitive Methodist Chapel, built in 1878, has now been converted into flats. The organ is now in Jurby parish church. The Isle of Man Christian Fellowship are based at the Philip Christian Centre on Christian Street. St Patrick's Roman Catholic Church is on Patrick Street.

There is also another Evangelical church in Peel named Living Hope which is now held in QE2 High School. It was formerly (until mid 2011) held in the Philip Christian Centre.

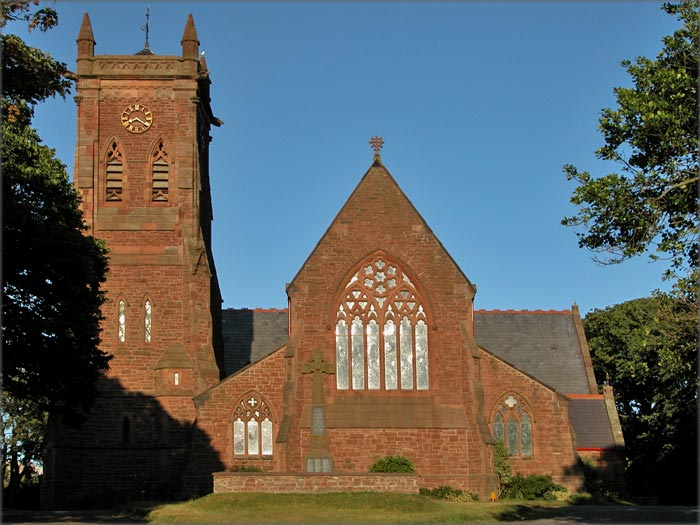
Peel Cathedral

Reproductions of medieval Manx crosses at Peel Cathedral

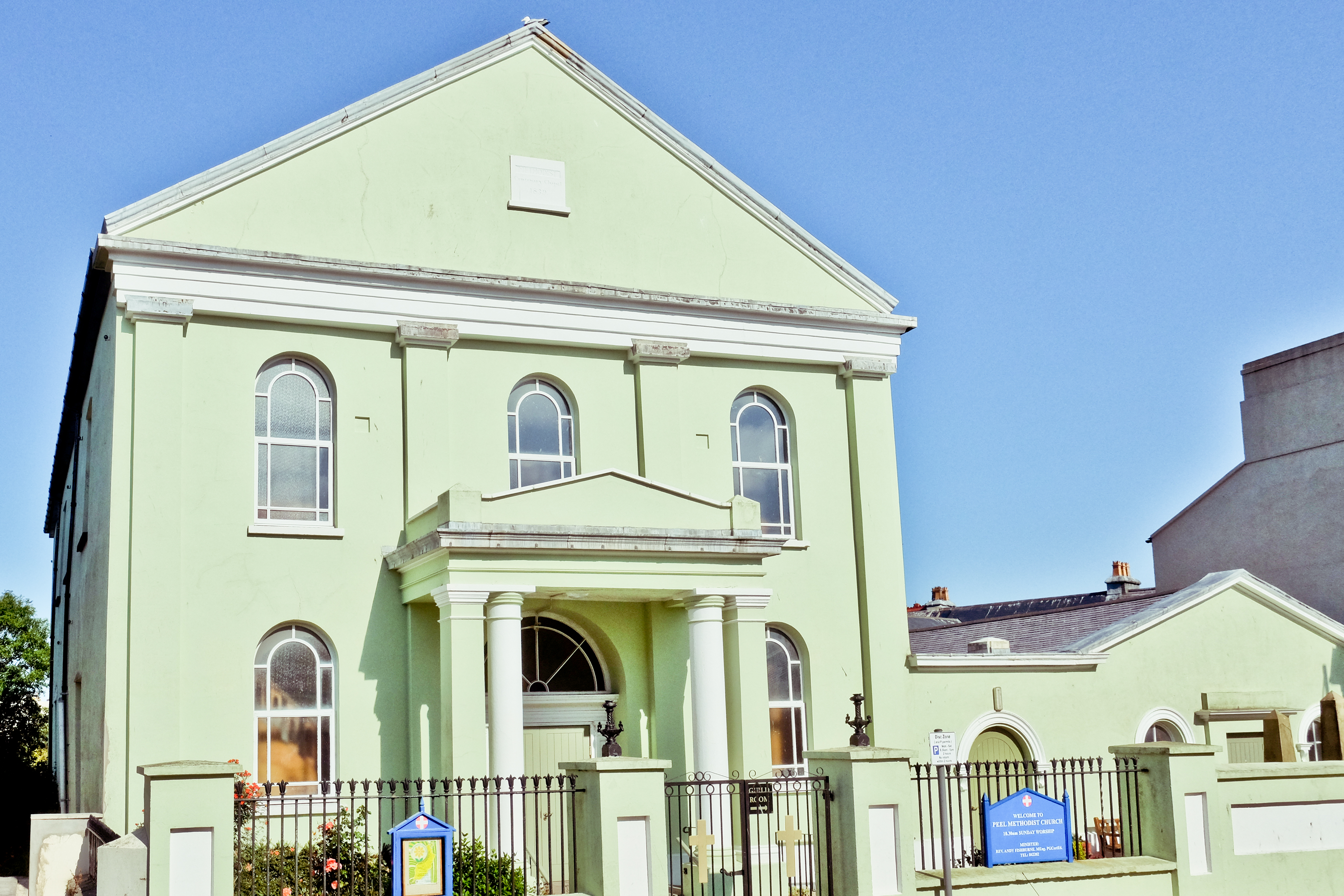
Peel Methodist Church

== Education ==
The local secondary school is Queen Elizabeth II High School, which is on Douglas Road at the eastern edge of the town. It was opened on 5 July 1979 by Queen Elizabeth II, during her visit to the Island to celebrate the millennium of Tynwald, and since then has grown to about 850 pupils with about 50 staff. The school is one of five main schools in the Island, the others being Ramsey Grammar School, St Ninians High School, Castle Rushen High School and Ballakermeen High School.

Peel Clothworkers' School is a primary school on Derby Road, which was founded in the 17th century after Philip Christian, a successful expatriate Peel businessman, bequeathed a sum of money in his will to provide for the education of the children in Peel. After changing sites in the town a number of times, as it grew and developed, it finally moved to Derby Road after World War II and officially opened there in 1953. It is the third largest primary school in the Isle of Man. On 23 April 2008 new £3.3m facilities at the school were officially opened. New dining/assembly hall, kitchen, reception/office complex, meeting room, library, special needs unit, ICT suite had all opened in June 2007, while a refurbished sports hall, staff facilities, two more classrooms and a permanent nursery were added in 2008.

Christian's Endowed National School was built in 1860. It was closed for some time in the mid-20th century before it was refurbished and became the Philip Christian Centre, and a registered building.

== House of Keys Elections ==
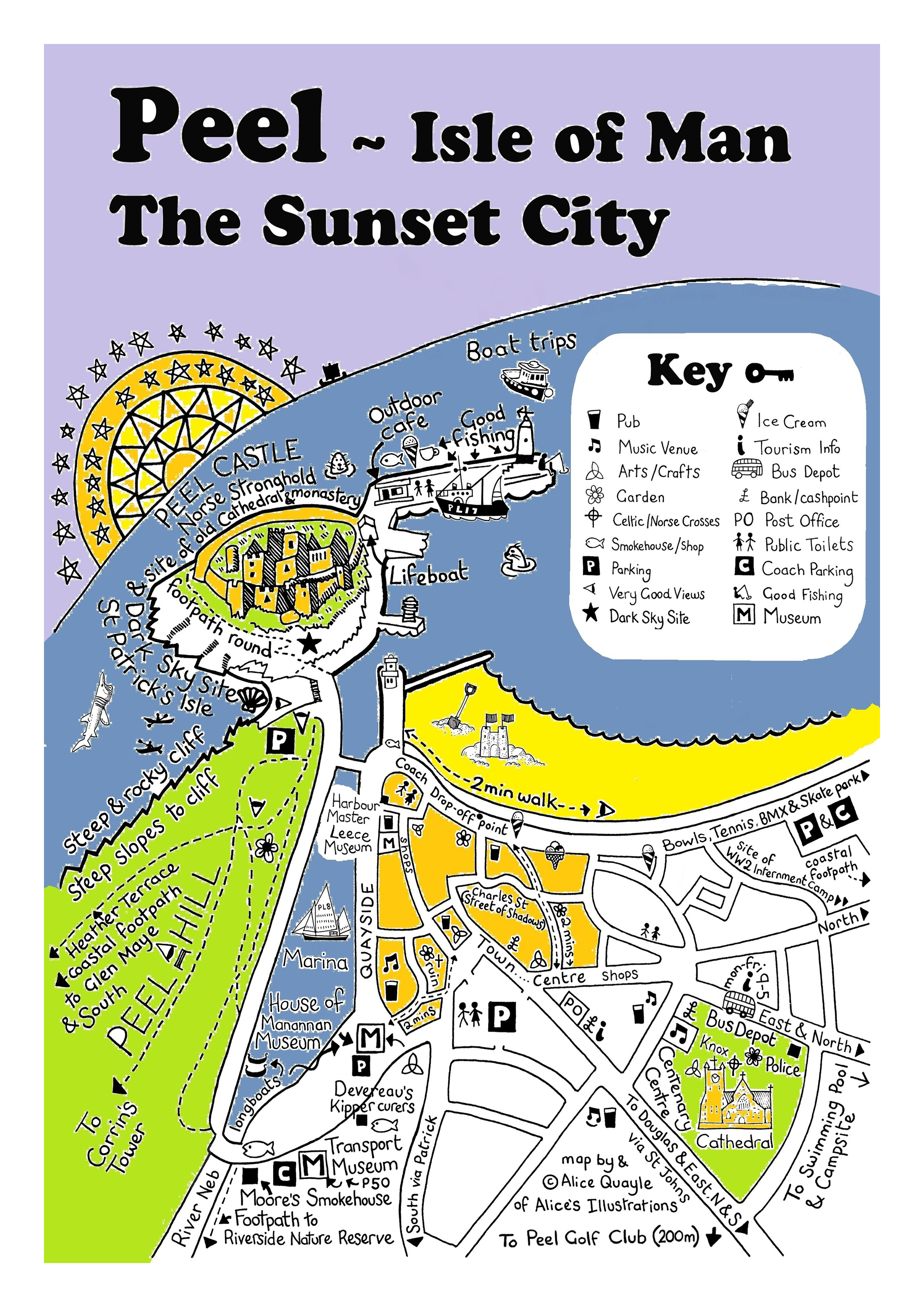
Map of central Peel

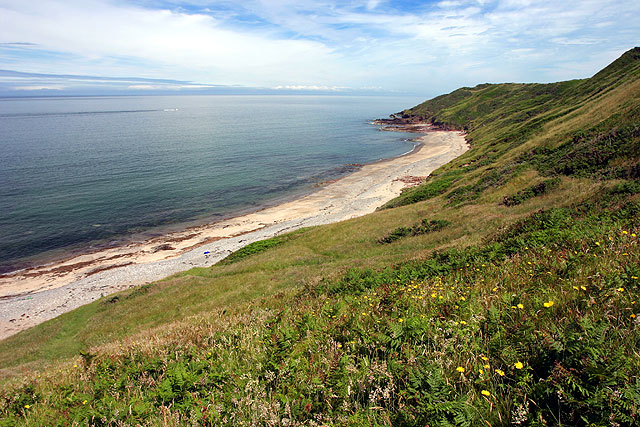
White Strand beach

This list is incomplete.

Year	Election	Turnout	Candidates
1900	By-Election	?	Alfred Nelson Laughton, elected; Dr W Keegan Faraker
By-election due to the resignation of Thomas Clague
1903	General Election	?	Thomas Henry Cormode, 311 votes, elected; Alfred Nelson Laughton, 287 votes
1908	General Election		Thomas Henry Cormode, elected unopposed
1913	General Election	?	Thomas Henry Cormode, elected; G B Kermode
1919	General Election	?	Christopher R. Shimmin, Manx Labour, elected; ?
1924	General Election	?	Christopher R. Shimmin, Manx Labour, elected; ?
1929	General Election	?	Christopher R. Shimmin, Manx Labour, elected; ?
1933	By-Election	?	Marion Shimmin, elected; ?
By-election following the death of Christopher R. Shimmin, husband of Marion Shimmin
1934	General Election		Marion Shimmin, elected unopposed
1978	By-Election	?	Dr David Moore, elected; ?
1981	General Election	?	Dr David Moore, elected; Hazel Hannan, Mec Vannin; ?
1986	General Election	79.5%	Hazel Hannan (664 votes, elected); GF Crowe (361 votes); GLC McPherson (358 votes); MB Hartley (249 votes); MCD Felton (147 votes); SR Pitts (140 votes); ER Kelly (63 votes); JM Wade (63 votes); RJ Quayle (46 votes)
1991	General Election	76.5%	Hazel Hannan (1066 votes, elected); MC Kelly (627 votes); GF Crowe (517 votes)
1996	General Election	70.7%	Hazel Hannan (1042 votes, elected); Christine Moughtin (477 votes); Tim Crookall (469 votes)
2001	General Election	61.8%	Hazel Hannan (1296 votes, elected); Christine Moughtin (505 votes)
2006	General Election	63.4%	Tim Crookall, 839 votes, elected; Hazel Hannan, 712 votes; Rodger Gimbert, 321 votes
2011	General Election	62.8%	Tim Crookall, 646, elected; Rodger Gimbert, 252; Leslie Hanson, 615; Raymond Harmer, 522; Arran Kaighin, 280
2015	By-Election	55.9%	Raymond Harmer, 799, elected; Leslie Hanson, 616; Penelope Hardman, 325; David Pownall, 30

The Peel constituency was amalgamated with Glenfaba for the 22 September 2016 general election to form the constituency of Glenfaba & Peel.

== Notable people ==
- Isla Callister, folk musician
- Betty Hanson (1918 in Peel – 2008 in Douglas) was a Manx politician and teacher.
- Stewart Stevenson Moore QC (1860 in Peel – 1951 in Chelsea, London) was a Manx lawyer, who was the First Deemster and Clerk of the Rolls in the Isle of Man.
- Sophia Morrison (1859 in Peel – 1917 in Peel) was a Manx cultural activist, folklore collector and author.
- Bernard Moffatt (born in Peel 1946) Founder member of Mec Vannin, the Manx Nationalist Party and Trade Union official.
- Millie Robinson (1924 – 1994) Irish-born Manx racing cyclist lived in Peel
- James Teare (1872 in Peel – 1909) was a Manx merchant navy officer who served on numerous Isle of Man Steam Packet Company vessels. Capt. Teare is best known as the Master of the RMS Ellan Vannin on her ill-fated voyage from Ramsey, Isle of Man to Liverpool on 3 December 1909.
- James Kewley Ward (1819 in Peel – 1910 in Westmount, Quebec) was a Canadian lumber merchant and politician, educated at May's Academy in Douglas, Isle of Man, he emigrated to the United States in 1842.
- Hugo Flinn (1879 in Peel - 1943 in Cobh, Ireland) was an Irish Fianna Fáil politician born in Peel.

== In popular culture ==
Govags or gobbags, among other spellings, was a word used by Peel people to describe others, but nowadays more often used by others to refer to people from Peel (see Manx English#Manx loanwords and Lesson 2 - Where do you live? | Learn Manx)

== Other sources ==
- Ingram, Michael (1983) Voyage of Odin's Raven (Clearwater) ISBN 978-0-946363-00-1
