= Catholic Church in the Isle of Man =

The Catholic Church in the Isle of Man is part of the worldwide Catholic Church, under the spiritual leadership of the Pope in Rome.

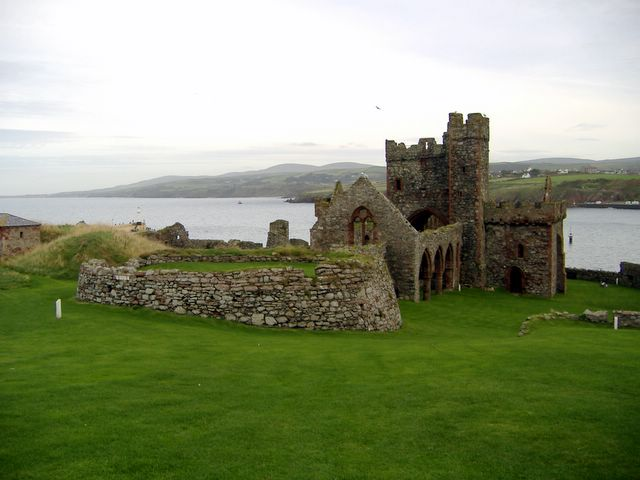
Ruins of the Pre-Reformation St Germanus of Man's Cathedral, the former seat of the Diocese of the Isles, on St Patrick's Isle, near Peel, Isle of Man.

Although not part of the United Kingdom, for geopolitical reasons the Isle of Man is part of the Archdiocese of Liverpool. There are Catholic churches in all of the main towns, the largest being the Cathedral of St Mary of the Isle in Douglas. A large percentage of the Catholics on the Isle of Man are Irish or of Irish descent.

== History ==
=== Early history ===
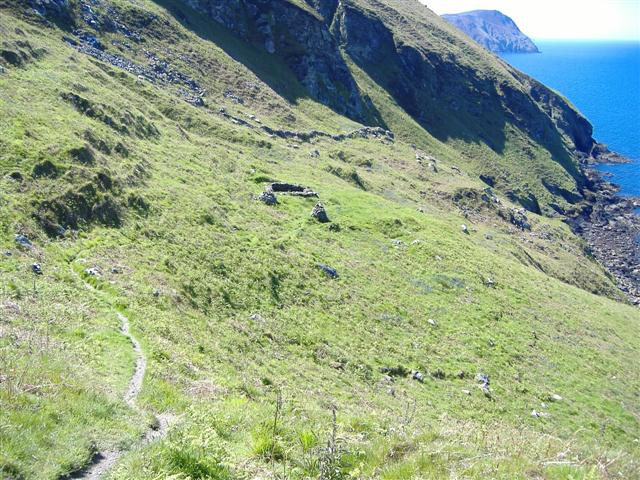
The Mass rock, holy well, and Christian pilgrimage site known in the Manx language as Lag ny Keeilley (Hollow of the Church) on Cronk ny Arrey Laa ("Hill of the Day Watch"), civil parish of Rushen, Isle of Man.

St. Patrick's Isle, near Peel, is said to be the place where St Patrick first set foot upon the Isle of Man in 444 while returning from Roman Britain to Gaelic Ireland. Having established Christianity among the Manx people, he appointed Breton missionary priest St. Germanus of Man as bishop, to oversee the further Christianization of the Manx people.

Furthermore, after baptizing Irish clan chief and pirate leader Maughold, St. Patrick ordered the latter to do penance for his past crimes and to abandon himself to the Christian God by sailing alone from Ireland in a currach without oars. Maughold drifted to the isle, where two of Patrick's disciples, Romulus and Conindrus (Romuil and Conindri), were already established. Tradition says he landed on the northeast corner of the Isle near Ramsey, at the foot of a headland since called Maughold Head, where he lived as a hermit in a cave on the mountainside. He is said to have been chosen to succeed Romuil and Conindri as bishop and eventually as the patron saint of the Manx people.

Some scholars in recent centuries have identified a distinctive Celtic Church, to which Catholics, Protestants, and Eastern Orthodox Christians have all claimed in historical debates to be the only legitimate heirs. In the Celtic Church, attitudes towards clerical celibacy were more relaxed, a differing form of monastic tonsure was used, the use of prayer beads known as the Pater Noster cord preceded the invention of the rosary by St Dominic, and the lunar method was used for calculating the date of Easter. During the 1960s, Frank O'Connor explained that the reason why, on both sides of the Irish Sea, abbots were often more powerful than bishops is because a Church governed by an Episcopal polity, "in a tribal society was a contradiction in terms. No tribe, however small or weak, would accept the authority of a bishop from another tribe; but with a monastic organisation, each tribe could have its own monastery, and the larger ones could have as many as they wished."

Also, despite a shared belief in the Real Presence in the Eucharist, the veneration of the Blessed Virgin, and shared use of the Ecclesiastical Latin liturgical language, as is documented by primary sources such as the Stowe Missal, there were often significant differences between the Celtic Rite and the mainstream Roman Rite and evidence of a distinctive form of Celtic chant in Latin, which is most closely related to Gallican chant, also survives in liturgical music manuscripts dating from the period.

The Isle of Man is far more important than one might realize to history of both the Celtic Church and the Catholic Church in Scotland. This is because, prior to the Protestant Reformation, the now ruined St Germanus of Man's Cathedral on St. Patrick's Isle was the headquarters of the Diocese of the Isles, which in its full form included the Outer Hebrides, most of the Inner Hebrides (including Iona, Skye, Raasay, Canna, Eigg, Coll, Tiree, Mull, Colonsay, Islay, Jura, Gigha – but not Lismore, Kerrera, Seil or Luing, all under the Bishop of Argyll), the Isle of Bute and the Isle of Arran. The Diocese may have originally contained the Gaelic-speaking Lowland region Galloway, a suggestion thought to explain the possible attacks of Wimund on Bishop Gilla Aldan of Whithorn.

Beginning in the 12th century reign of Rǫgnvaldr Guðrøðarson as King of the Isles, a Cistercian nunnery existed on the island which was known as Douglas Priory and whose mother superior carried the title Baroness of Douglas. During the Suppression of the Monasteries in 1540, Douglas Priory was seized by Henry VIII and secularized into a private estate still known as The Nunnery.

=== Reformation and recusancy ===
At the beginning of the English Reformation, the Act of Supremacy declared King Henry VIII the Supreme Head of the Church in all his dominions and defined even unspoken mental reservation as high treason. The resulting religious persecution ended only with Catholic Emancipation in 1829.

During the most anti-Catholic periods the English Penal Laws stipulated perpetual imprisonment or execution for aiding an outlawed priest, or saying or attending the Tridentine Mass. The same laws declared all Catholics disenfranchised, incapable of owning, purchasing, or inheriting land, and made the possession of a horse worth more than £5 a capital offence. The Island did not follow these practices - until his death quite late in the Elizabethan era, the 3rd Earl of Derby, the Lord of Mann, was a Catholic Recusant who did little to spread the Church of England to the Island, where the English Reformation progressed relatively slowly.

The island, whose people since the days of the Celtic Church had held a particularly strong devotion to Saint Patrick, Saint Brigid of Kildare, and Saint Maughold, long maintained the tradition of giving the dying a drink of water from the local holy well, but eventually former places of Christian pilgrimage slowly fell into ruins once the population no longer believed in the intercession of the saints.

Though the Island displayed considerable religious toleration (however around the 1660s a small group of Maughold Quakers was persecuted) and had none of the penal laws about Catholics that so disfigured the English Statute book, they were of course required to obey the ecclesiastical laws of attendance at church, places of marriage and burial etc.

During the 18th-century, Thomas Wilson, the Anglican Bishop of Sodor and Man, proudly alleged that dissent on the island from the Established Church was unheard of; there were only one or two families of Quakers and no Catholics at all. In reality, several Catholic priests were briefly imprisoned in the 18th century for illegally celebrating marriages, another was presented in 1759 for ministering to a non-Catholic.

Meanwhile, the widespread practice of smuggling brought trading links with Ireland, France and other Catholic countries, thus providing a nucleus for a small Catholic community.

From 1779 a Benedictine monk, Father Johnston, who served the mission at St. Begh's Whitehaven, started to make regular pastoral calls - he noted some 29 Catholics living on the Island. In 1789 a French émigré priest, Father Louis, sought asylum on the Island; for a time he acted as tutor to the governor's and bishop's children whilst living at Castle Rushen. Whenever possible, he would covertly offer Mass in a barn at Scarlett or inside the cottages of Manx Catholic families. He appears to have left the Island before 1794.

Around the early 19th century an influx of Irish Catholics, refugees fleeing the Irish rebellion of 1798, brought the number of Catholics up to around 200. One of these families, the Fagans, brought over their chaplain, Father Collins, who until his death in 1811 seems to have ministered to the Irish fishing community of Castletown. He is buried near St. Michael, which appears to have been regularly used as a chapel.

The first priest to reside in Douglas was Father Miles McPharlan - as Rev Demsey says his story is not without interest and is also linked to the Dublin rising. Lieutenant Major John Taubman (of The Nunnery family and later Speaker of the House of Keys) and a contingent from the Manx Fencibles were sent to Dublin where Major Taubman was billeted in Fr McPharlan's rooms (though Peter Kelly in his History of St Mary's treats this as something of a myth).

When Fr McPharlan fled to the Island around 1804, to escape debts incurred in setting up a brick factory for his Irish parish, he made contact with Major Taubman who donated a site within the disused quarry on the Douglas-Castletown road, for Catholic worship. Eventually in 1814 the small chapel dedicated to St. Bridget of Kildare was built though Fr McPharlan left for France to better escape his creditors.

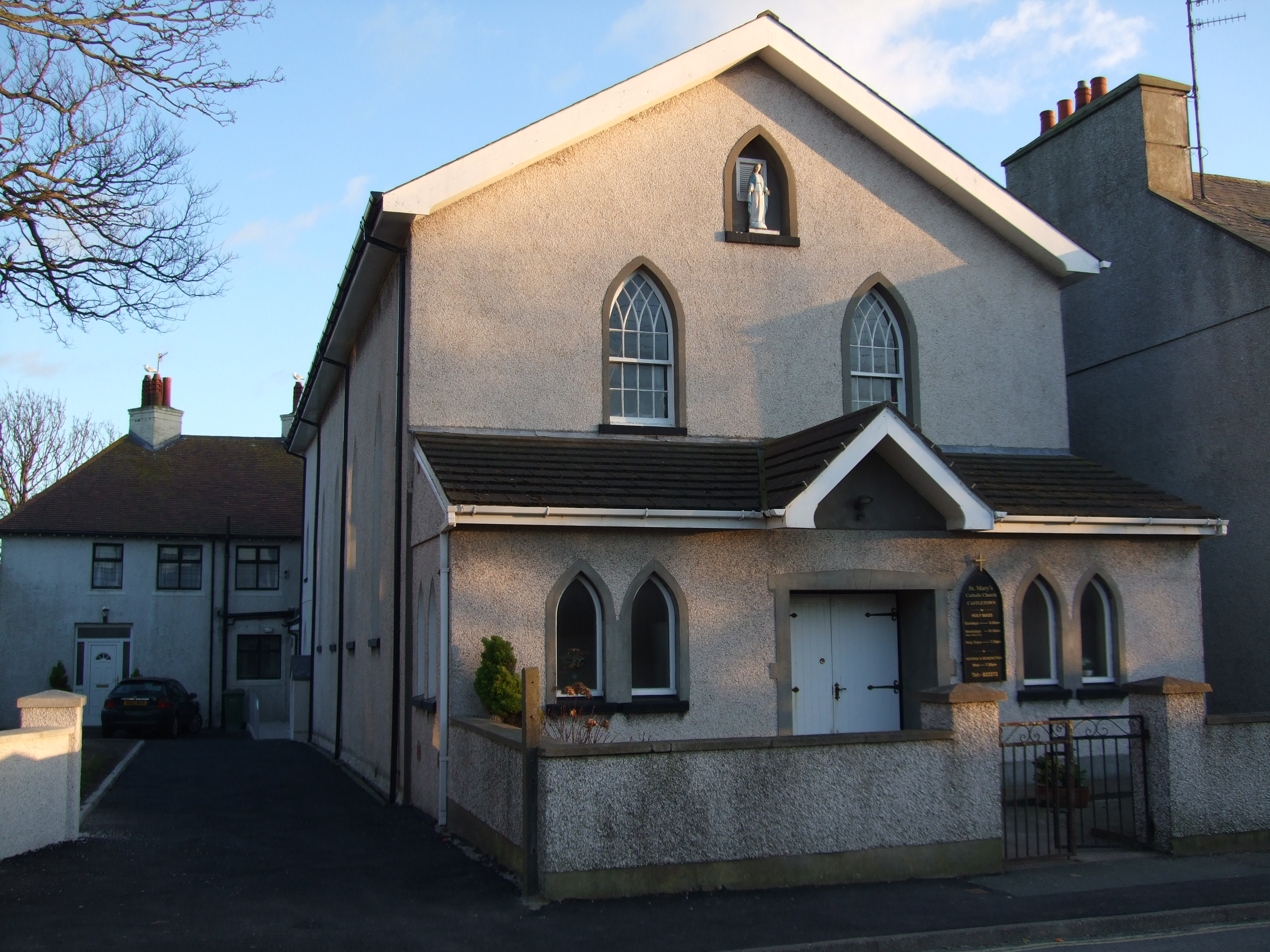
St Mary's Catholic Church, Castletown.

The Irish Jesuit College, which had provided some earlier priests on a temporary basis, agreed to provide a resident priest in 1823 - this was Father Gahan, who also opened St. Mary's Church in Castletown.

Along with Fr Gahan came John Kelly who became headmaster of a Catholic school, the inception of St Mary of the Isle Church at Douglas in 1824. The school attracted many Protestant as well as Catholic students by providing a Classical Christian education rooted in the Trivium.

=== Revival ===
After Catholic Emancipation, the Manx parishes were first served by bishops and priests from the Catholic Church in Ireland.

Fr Gahan's generous Irish friends allowed the purchase of an old theatre at the corner of Athol Street and Prospect Hill which was adapted for use as Chapel and school in 1836. An additional footnote added to the second, 1841, edition of Quiggin's Guide noting this move stated that we are not aware of a single conversion of a Manx native "to Popery", having occurred on the Island.

Fr Gahan died in 1837 before St Mary of the Isle Church was completed and his memorial can be seen in the grounds of St. Mary's - he was accorded a full and generous tribute in the Mona's Herald - a letter to the Manx Liberal (dated 6 Oct 1837), however, states that Fr Gahan's memorial in Krk Braddan had been repeated desecrated, mainly by anti-Catholic graffiti both chalked and scratched into his gravestone.

On 29 July 1837 the Manx Liberal reported, "On Wednesday last, arrived from Liverpool, his Lordship the R. Rev. Doctor Brigs, R. C. Bishop of the northern district of England, accompanied by the Very Rev. Doctor Ewins, of Liverpool; and on the following day administered the sacrament of confirmation in the Church of St Francis Xavier, in Athol Street, the Rev. Messrs. Aylmer and M'Grath attending, where upwards of 110 children and adults were confirmed."

The Great Famine of Ireland of the 1840s further increased the Catholic population who towards the end of the century were further swelled in the summer months by tourists from the North of England.

During the 1850 restoration of the Catholic hierarchy in England and Wales, all Manx Catholics have been served by the Diocese of Liverpool (Archdiocese after 1911).

Today, the Catholic Church on the Isle of Man is officially designated as Pastoral Area Twenty Four Under the Patronage of Saint Maughold. The Knights of St Columba, a fraternal service order which were founded at Glasgow in 1919, are also active at every Catholic parish in the Isle of Man. The Islanders are affiliated with the Knights' Province of Liverpool.

In 2012 a bishop's seal was discovered buried in a field in the north of Man, bearing the inscription, "Let the prayers to God of Germanus and Patricius help us".

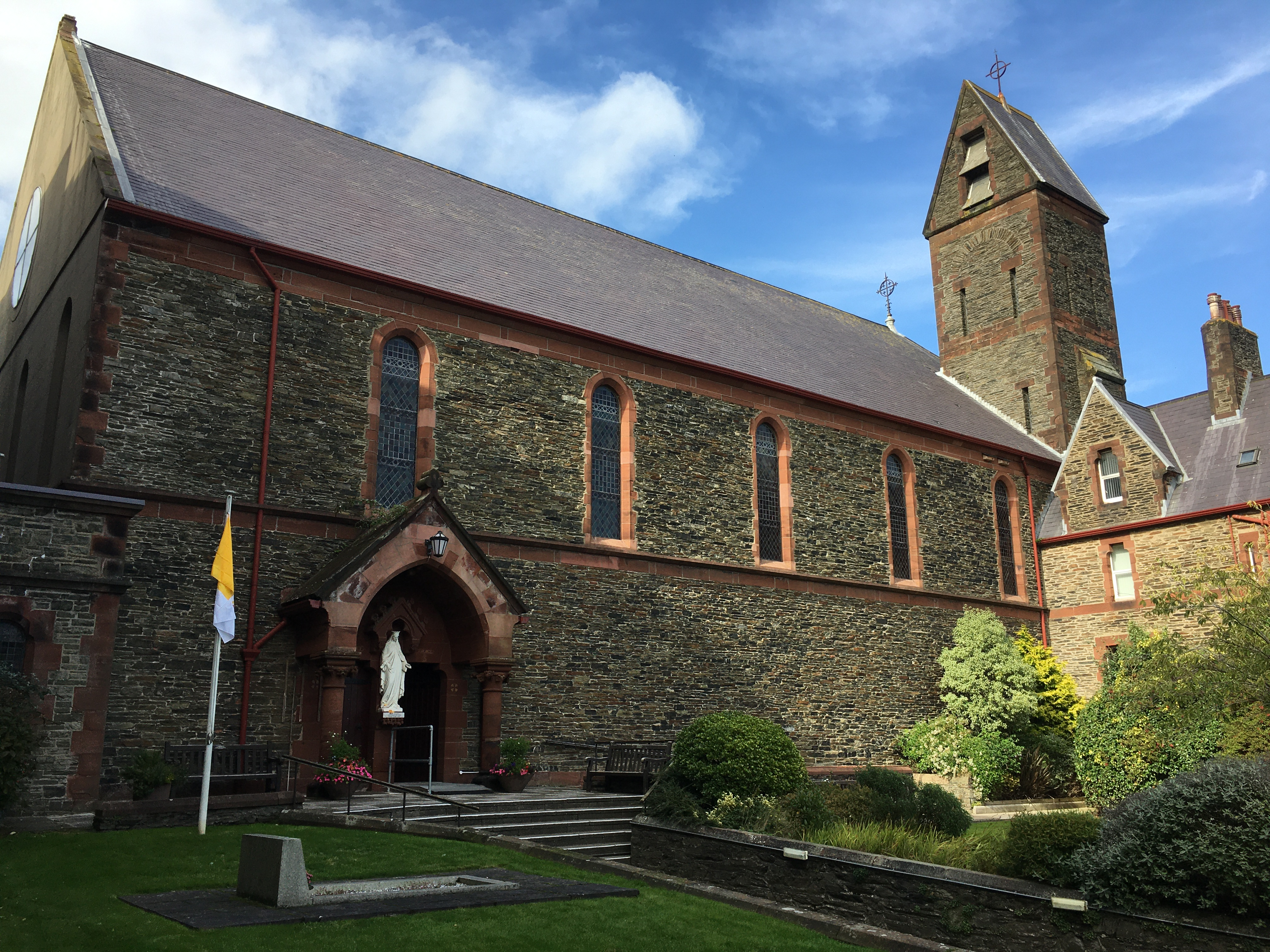
St Mary of the Isle Cathedral, Douglas, Isle of Man.

In a move towards the Isle of Man having a Bishop of its own, in September 2023 St Mary of the Isle Church in Douglas was granted Co-Cathedral status by Pope Francis. During the Mass of dedication, the Lord's Prayer was recited in Manx Gaelic and the Manx National Anthem was also performed.

Since becoming the first co-cathedral in the British Isles, St Mary of the Isle has been regularly visited by Malcolm McMahon, the Archbishop of Liverpool and his auxiliary bishops. It is the usual venue for ordinations to the priesthood, the diaconate, and the sacrament of Confirmation, as well as the island's annual commemoration of Yom HaShoah.

== Important people ==
- Germanus of Man (c.410 - c.474) Breton missionary priest and bishop.
- Maughold (died c. 488 AD), Irish missionary and patron saint of the Manx people.
- Saint Sanctan, a 6th-century Welsh missionary bishop originally from the Hen Ogledd.
- Robert Anderton (c. 1560 – 25 April 1586) Manx Roman Catholic priest, graduate of the English College at Rheims, and one of the Douai Martyrs. Captured by Elizabethan era authorities while attempting to return following his ordination abroad, hanged, drawn and quartered at the Isle of Wight, officially for high treason, but in reality for refusing to take the Oath of Supremacy. Beatified by Pope Pius XI in 1929.
