= St Mary of the Isle Church =

Church in Douglas, Isle of Man

Co-cathedral of St Mary of the Isle
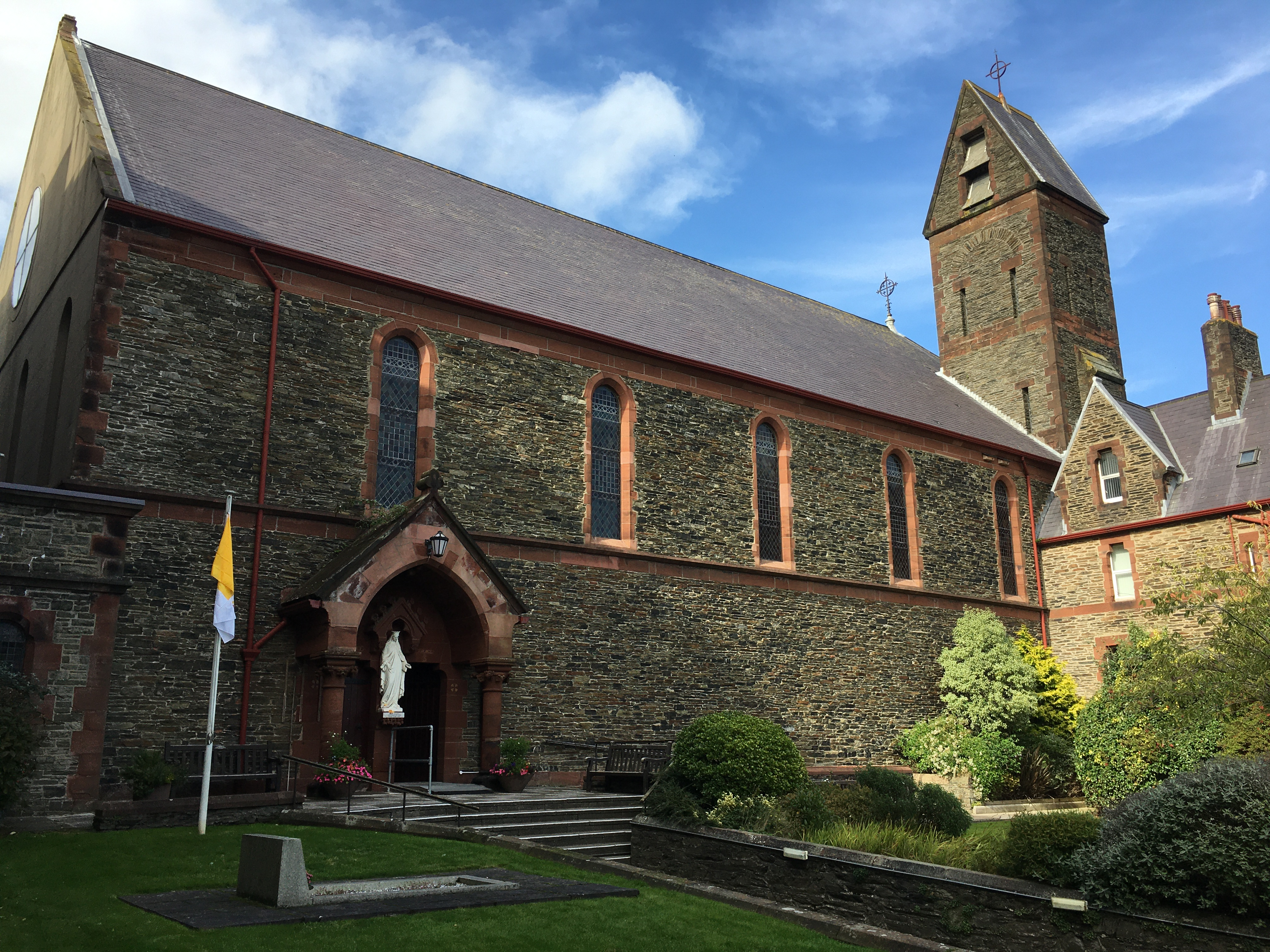
- St Mary's Co-cathedral, Douglas, Isle of Man

- Location within Isle of Man
- 54.150655°N 4.482393°W
- Location: Hill Street, Douglas, Isle of Man.
- Country: Isle of Man
- Denomination: Roman Catholic
- Website: manxcatholic.org.uk

History
- Status: Co-cathedral
- Founded: 1859
- Dedication: Saint Mary & Saint Joseph

Architecture
- Functional status: Active
- Style: Gothic
- Groundbreaking: 1857
- Completed: 1859

Specifications
- Capacity: 1,000 (approximate)

Administration
- Province: Province of Liverpool
- Diocese: Archdiocese of Liverpool

Clergy
- Priest: Canon Philip Gillespie

The St Mary of the Isle Church, also referred to as the Co-cathedral of St Mary of the Isle, is a Roman Catholic co-cathedral in Douglas, Isle of Man. It is part of the Roman Catholic Pastoral Area of St Maughold within the Archdiocese of Liverpool. It is one of two cathedrals on the Island, and one of six Catholic churches. It is referred to locally as St. Mary's. In September 2023, St Mary of the Isle was granted co-cathedral status.

== History ==
Prior to the Reformation, the Church on the Island was the independent Diocese of Sodor and Man, which, since the Reformation, continues as an Anglican diocese. It is part of the Church of England with its own Bishop resident on the Island with its own cathedral, the Cathedral Church of Saint German, in the town of Peel.

The post-Reformation Catholic Cathedral on the Island forms part of the Archdiocese of Liverpool and constitutes one third of the land mass of the Archdiocese.

The first Catholic Chapel on the Island to be constructed after the Reformation was built by Father Miles McPharlan who was in situation from 1803 to 1820, on land which was gifted to the church by Lieutenant Colonel John Taubman Goldie-Taubman, Speaker of the House of Keys.

Father McPharlan was succeeded in 1820 by Fr. Matthew Gahan, who arrived from Dublin, and who opened the church of St. Mary, at Castletown, then the capital of the Isle of Man, in 1826.

However, by the 1850s, Douglas was far outstripping Castletown both in population and civic importance, thereby making it apparent that a larger church was required which would be situated in the centre of the town.

=== Construction ===
Fr. Gahan was highly industrious in raising the required funds, and the foundation stone of St. Mary's was laid by the Right Reverend Dr. Alexander Goss, Bishop of Liverpool, on 28 October 1857.

=== Completion and consecration ===
The church opened for worship on 4 August 1859.

=== Cathedral Status ===
As part of the late Queen Elizabeth's Platinum Jubilee celebrations in June 2022, Douglas was awarded city status. Following the granting of city status, on Friday, 22 September 2023, Pope Francis granted cathedral status to the Church of Saint Mary of the Isle.

The Church is a co-cathedral with the Metropolitan Cathedral of Christ the King, and is the first Catholic co-cathedral in the British Isles.

Although rare in the Catholic Church, co-cathedrals exist when two dioceses, each with its own cathedral, are merged or when a single diocese spans two distinct civil jurisdictions.

=== Modern use ===
Today St. Mary's continues to play an active part in the religious and secular life of the local community. A Registered Building, the cathedral is situated on the junction of Hill Street and Prospect Hill, opposite Tynwald and the Isle of Man's legislative buildings. The cathedral is regularly visited by the Archbishop of Liverpool and his auxiliary bishops. It is the venue for ordinations to the priesthood, the diaconate and the sacrament of Confirmation.

St Mary of the Isle is a regular venue for civic occasions such as the Isle of Man Government Christmas Carol Service and the annual Holocaust Memorial Day Mass. These are attended by the Chief Minister and his cabinet, along with the Island's Lieutenant Governor and civic leaders and officials. The cathedral organ is over 100 years old and was restored in 2006 by Peter Jones.

== See also ==
- Catholic Church in the Isle of Man
- Archdiocese of Liverpool
- Liverpool Metropolitan Cathedral
