= Peel Cathedral =

Cathedral in Peel, Isle of Man

Coordinates: 54°13′18″N 4°41′28″W

Peel Cathedral, Isle of Man
- Cathedral Church of St German
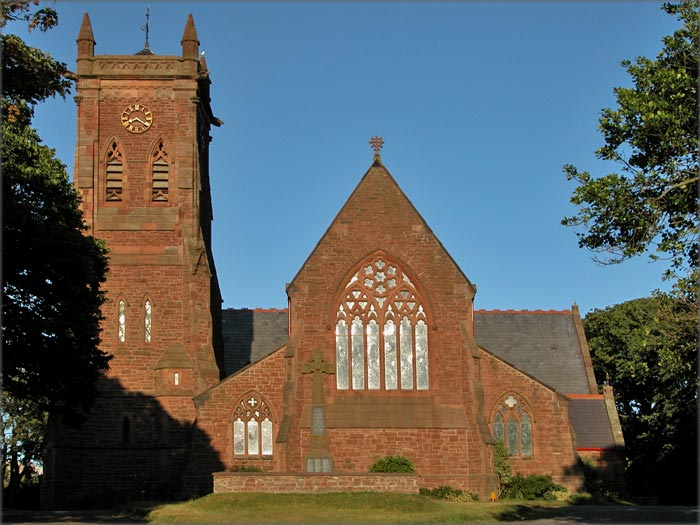

- Shown within Isle of Man
- Location: Peel
- Country: Isle of Man
- Denomination: Church of England
- Website: www.cathedral.im

History
- Former name(s): Kirk German, Peel Parish Church
- Consecrated: 1893

Architecture
- Designated: 1980
- Previous cathedrals: Peel Cathedral & Castle (on St Patrick's Isle); Bishopcourt chapel (pro-cathedral)

Administration
- Province: York
- Diocese: Sodor and Man

Clergy
- Bishop: Tricia Hillas
- Dean: Nigel Godfrey

The Cathedral Church of Saint German or Peel Cathedral, renamed Cathedral Isle of Man, is located in Peel, Isle of Man. The cathedral is also one of the parish churches in the parish of the West Coast, which includes the town of Peel. Built in 1879–84, it was made the cathedral by Act of Tynwald in 1980.

It is the cathedral church of the Church of England Diocese of Sodor and Man.

== History ==
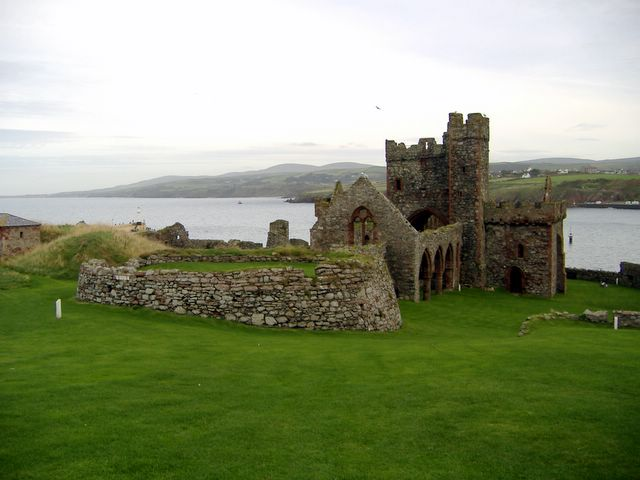
Original cathedral of the Diocese of the Isles on St Patrick's Isle.

The patron of the cathedral, St German of Man (not to be confused with Germanus of Auxerre), was a Celtic missionary and holy man who lived from about 410 to 474. St German's Day is celebrated each year on 13 July.

The original cathedral of St German was inside the walls of Peel Castle and was built sometime in the 12th century when St Patrick's Isle was in the possession of Norse kings. At that time the church followed the Sarum Rite, prevalent throughout much of the British Isles. Around 1333 the Lords of Man refortified St Patrick's Isle and occupied the church as a fortress. In 1392 William Le Scroop repaired the cathedral.

The building fell into ruin in the 18th century. After a considerable period of debate over who owned the ruins and site, it was decided not to rebuild that cathedral. The present building was constructed in 1879–84 to replace St Peter's Church in Peel's market place. Although the building of the New Church was intended to become the diocesan cathedral, Bishop Rowley Hill’s Cathedral Bill didn’t make its final reading in Tynwald before he died. His successor abandoned the proposed Bill.

In 1895, Bishop Straton consecrated his chapel at Bishopscourt, his official residence, as a pro-cathedral and instituted a chapter of canons with himself as dean; by 1960, St Nicholas' Chapel was still a pro-cathedral (or "Cathedral Chapel"). Bishopscourt's sale in 1979 left the diocese without a cathedral, and forced the issue of choosing a new cathedral; after public consultation, Kirk German Parish Church was so designated, and officially made the cathedral in a service on All Saints' Day (1 November 1980). The arrangement (bishop as dean) persisted even after the consecration of the new cathedral. The bishop was later described by John Betjeman as "that luckless Bishop whose cathedral is a beautiful ruin of green slate and red sandstone on an islet overlooking Peel".

The cathedral has a dean and chapter. Until 15 October 2011, the Bishop of Sodor and Man was dean ex officio, but on that date the vicar of the parish became dean ex officio; this is thought to have been the historical arrangement from the 12th century until the late 19th century. The chapter consists of the Archdeacon of Man ex officio and four canons who are all parochial clergy in the diocese.

St German's Cathedral is the mother church of the Diocese of Sodor and Man, which today consists of only the Isle of Man.

In July 2015, Anne, Princess Royal, attended a thanksgiving service at Peel Cathedral as patron of the development campaign; the service also marked the rebranding of Peel Cathedral as "Cathedral Isle of Man". In 2016, following the mass shooting at Pulse, a nightclub in Orlando, Florida, the cathedral displayed a rainbow flag at a candlelit vigil for the victims to "show solidarity with the LGBT community."

Beneath the flagstones on the floor of the cathedral are the names and signatures of hundreds of local residents, written on the terracotta tiles in 2024 as part of a time capsule buried during the building's redevelopment.

In October 2024, Anne, Princess Royal, attended a further thanksgiving service for the reordering of the Cathedral. The seating is now fully adaptable for multiple uses in the Cathedral, with the added comfort of underfloor heating.

== Vicars of German ==
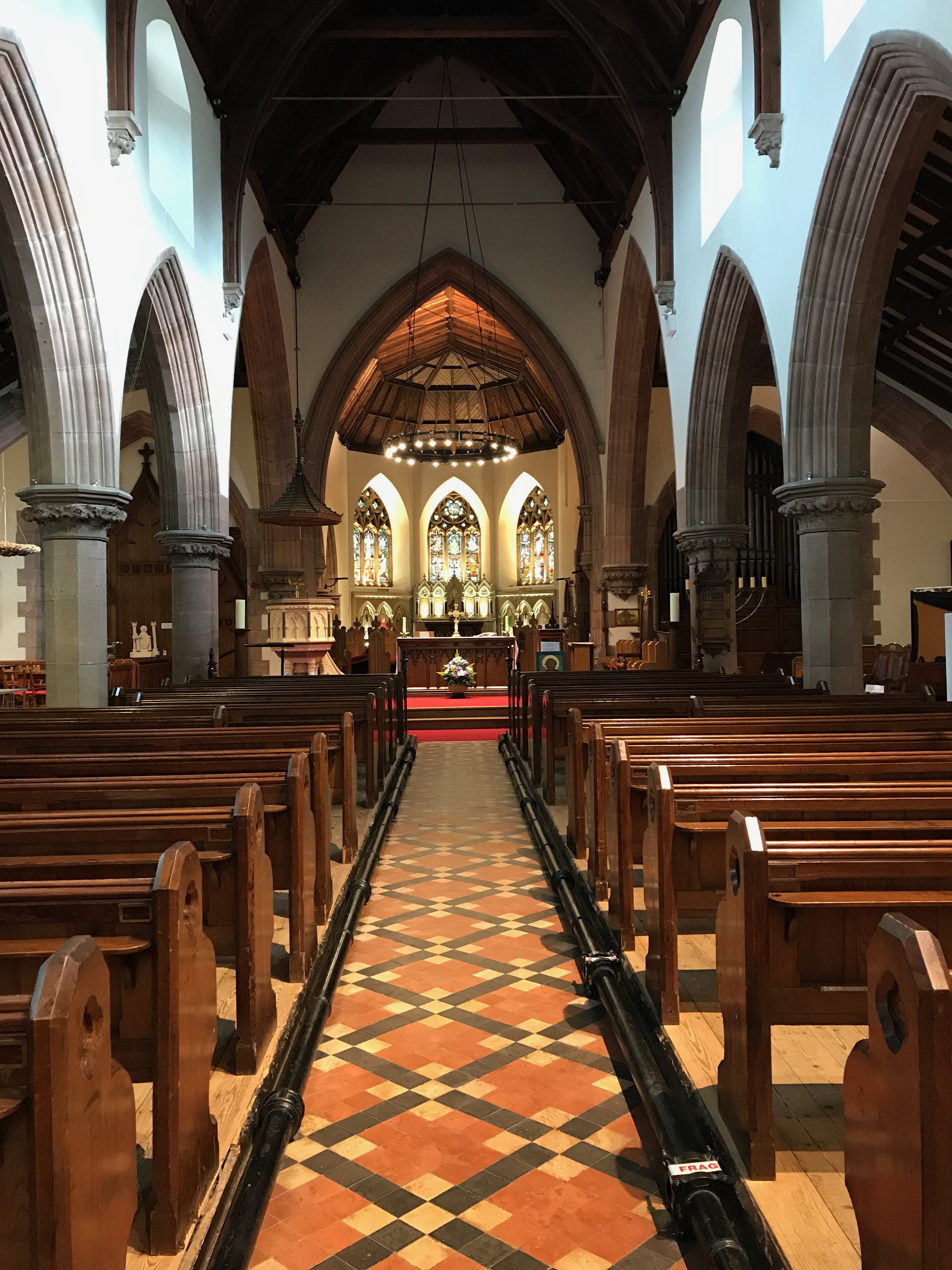
The nave, looking towards the nave altar and, beyond it, the choir, chancel, and high altar.

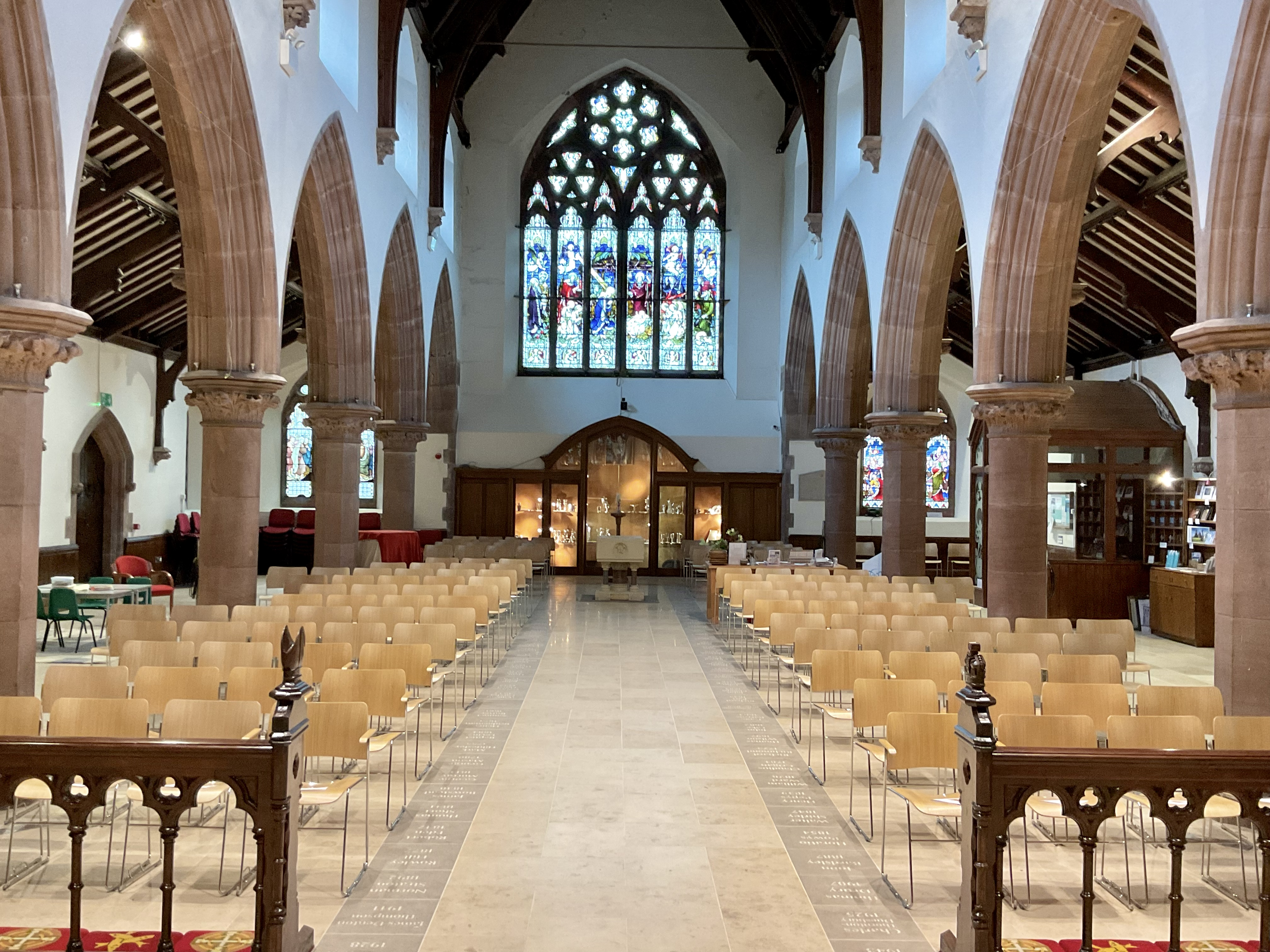
New chairs in reordered Cathedral 2024

Cathedral 2006.jpg

1575–1585	Philip Hogget
1585–1621	John Cosnahan
1621–1660	William Cosnahan
1660–1661	Thomas Harrison
1661–1680	Henry Lowcay
1680–1682	John Woods (elder)
5 July 1682 – 1710	Samuel Wattleworth
10 June 1710 – 1730	Matthias Curghey
26 September 1730 – 1733	John Woods (younger)
1733–1741	Thomas Christian
28 July 1741 – 1742	John Craine
1744–1752	James Wilks
11 November 1752 – December 1754	Robert Christian
15 April 1758 – 1761	Robert Brew
4 March 1761 – November 1801	Henry Corlett
23 November 1801 – 1839	James Gelling
28 March 1839 – ?	John Stowell

== Deans of St German ==
- 1895 – 15 October 2011: The Bishop of Sodor and Man
- 15 October 2011 – present: Nigel Godfrey, Vicar of the West Coast (Dalby, Kirk Michael, Patrick, Peel, and St Johns) since 2012

== Chapter ==
As of 30 December 2020:

- Archdeacon of Man and Vicar of Douglas (St George & All Saints) — Irene Cowell
- Vicar of Rushen and Canon of St German — Joe Heaton (canon since 2016)
- Vicar of Marown and Canon of St Columba — Janice Ward (canon since 2016)

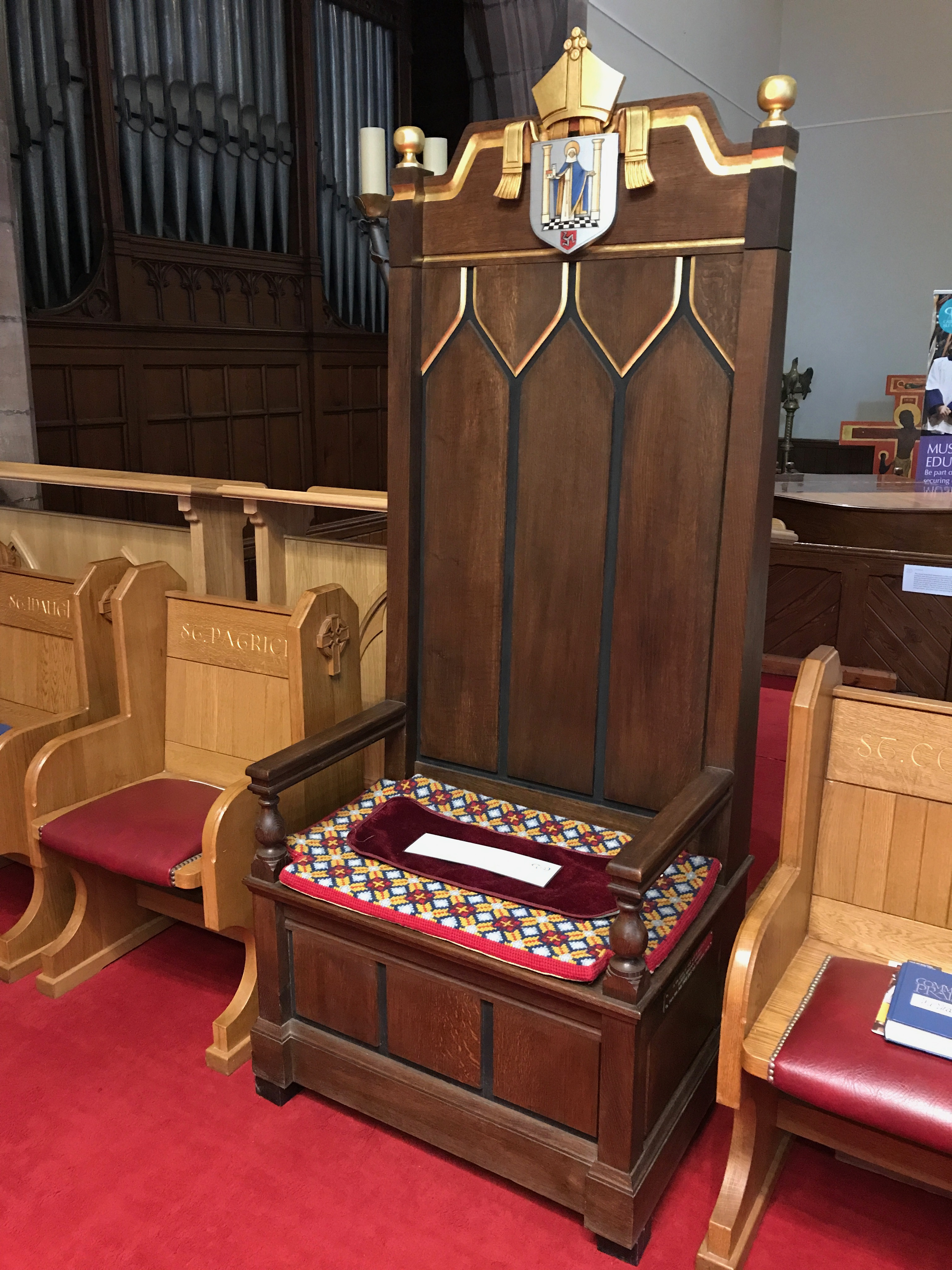
Cathedra (throne) of the Bishop of Sodor and Man, in Peel Cathedral.

== Music ==
Bishop Hildesley established a children's choir at his private chapel at Bishopscourt as early as 1755. At the opening of Peel New Church in 1884, Ms ML Wood ARCO was appointed the first organist and directed a large choir. The Festival of Nine Lessons and Carols, first established at Truro Cathedral in 1880, made its first appearance in Peel in 1885.

However, the modern Cathedral Choir was re-established in 2012 and includes a mixed boy and girl treble line (aged 7–14 years) drawn from island schools, in addition to a large adult voluntary choir (SATB). Choral services are sung on Sundays and consist of a Choral Eucharist and Choral Evensong.

There is a developing programme of choral scholarships for secondary school students.

The cathedral has a large two-manual Brindley & Foster organ in the chancel. It is planned that the pipe organ will be rebuilt, re-ordered and significantly enlarged over the next five years, to meet the demands of the cathedral's developing choral programme.

=== Organists and choirmasters ===
- 1983 Mike Porter
- 1986 Bernard Clark
- 1992 Stephen Dutton
- 1995 Harvey Easton
- 2001 Mike Porter

=== Organists and directors of music ===
- 2008 Donald Roworth
- 2012 Peter Litman

=== Organ scholars ===
- 2015–2016 Jack Oades
- 2016–2017 Max Smith
- 2017–2018 Max Smith
- 2018–2019 Christopher Beaumont
- 2019–2020 Harry Sullivan
- 2025 - 2026 Aaran Fleet

=== Associate organist ===
- 2018 - present Stuart Corrie
