= Diocese of the Isles =

Diocese in Scotland (c. 11 century-1689)

Coordinates: 54.22620°N 4.6981°W

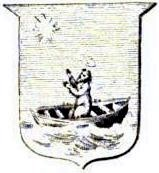
Arms of the diocese.

The Diocese of the Isles, also known as the Diocese of Suðreyar, or the Diocese of Sodor, was one of the dioceses of medieval Norway. After the mid-13th-century Treaty of Perth, the diocese was accounted as one of the 13 dioceses of Scotland. The original seat of the bishopric appears to have been at Peel, on St Patrick's Isle, where indeed it continued to be under English overlordship; the Bishopric of the Isles as it was after the split was relocated to the north, firstly to Snizort and then Iona.

== History ==
The diocese in its full form included the Outer Hebrides, most of the Inner Hebrides (including Iona, Skye, Raasay, Canna, Eigg, Coll, Tiree, Mull, Colonsay, Islay, Jura, Gigha – but not Lismore, Kerrera, Seil or Luing, all under the Bishop of Argyll), the Isle of Bute and the Isle of Arran, as well as the Isle of Man (Mann). The diocese may have originally contained Galloway, a suggestion thought to explain the possible attacks of Wimund on Bishop Gilla Aldan of Whithorn.

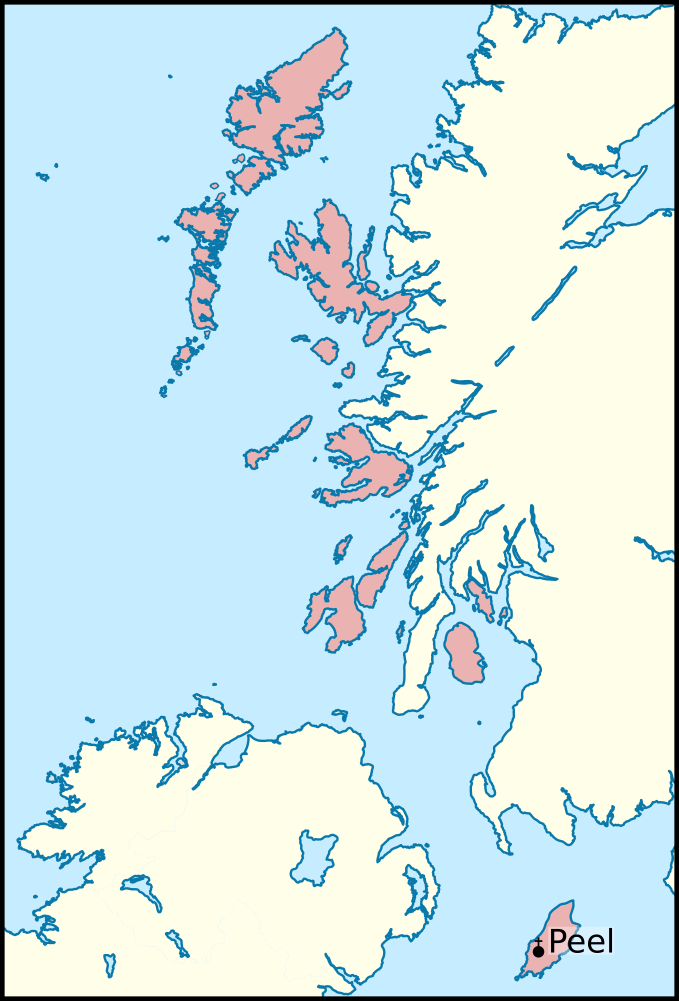
Extent of the diocese in about 1300.

From the 11th century until the creation of the Archdiocese of Niðarós, Mann and the Isles appear to have been under the jurisdiction of the Archbishop of York. Thereafter, it was formally under Niðarós (modern Trondheim). The diocese was severed after the English acquisition of Mann in the 14th century.

In 1472, however, the Norwegian territories of Orkney and Shetland became Scottish, as part of the marriage settlement of King James III of Scotland, following which the Bishopric of St. Andrews was elevated to an archdiocese, and the Isles (but not Mann) came under her jurisdiction.

The Bishopric's links with Rome ceased to exist after the Scottish Reformation, but continued, apart from temporary abolition between 1638 and 1661, under the Episcopal faction within the Church of Scotland until the Revolution of 1688. Episcopacy and Anglicanism in the established and Presbyterian-controlled Church of Scotland was permanently abolished in 1689 but it continued in the Non-juring Scottish Episcopal Church until 1702 with the death of Bishop Archibald Graham. The diocese then came under the care of the Bishop of Ross or Caithness or Moray variously. A new united Scottish Episcopal Diocese of Argyll and The Isles was established in 1847 with Bishop Alexander Ewing as the first Bishop living at Lochgilphead. In the Restoration of the Scottish Catholic hierarchy in 1878, a Roman Catholic Diocese of Argyll and the Isles was similarly reestablished and continues to exist. Those who belong to the Catholic Church in the Isle of Man, on the other hand, are now under the jurisdiction of the Roman Catholic Archdiocese of Liverpool.

== Medieval parishes ==
Source: Argyll Bute Inverness Ross. Man not included.

1. Barra (Barra)
2. Barvas (Lewis)
3. Benbecula (Benbecula)
4. Bracadale (Skye)
5. Canna (Canna)
6. Coll (Coll)
7. Colonsay (Colonsay)
8. Duirinish (Skye)
9. Eye or Stornoway (Lewis)
10. Gigha & Cara (Gigha)
11. Harris (Harris)
12. Howmore (South Uist)
13. Inchkenneth (Mull)
14. Iona (Iona)
15. Jura or Killearndale (Jura)
16. Kilarrow (Islay)
17. Kilbride (Arran)
18. Kilchoman (Islay)
19. Kilcolmkill (Mull)
20. Kildalton (Islay)
21. Kildonan (Eigg)
22. Kilfinichen (Mull)
23. Kilmaluoc (Raasay)
24. Kilmeny (Islay)
25. Kilmore (Mull)
26. Kilmory (Arran)
27. Kilmuir or Kilmorie (North Uist)
28. Kilmuir (Skye)
29. Kilninian (Mull)
30. Kilpeter (South Uist)
31. Kilvickeon (Mull)
32. Kingarth (Bute)
33. Kirkapoll (Tiree)
34. Lochs (Lewis)
35. Minginish (Skye)
36. Ness (Lewis)
37. Rodel (Harris)
38. Rothesay (Bute)
39. Sand (North Uist)
40. Sleat (Skye)
41. Snizort (Skye)
42. Soroby (Tiree)
43. Strath (Skye)
44. Torosay or Killean (Mull)
45. Trumpan (Skye)
46. Uig (Lewis)
47. Uig (Skye)

== See also ==
- Bishop of the Isles, list of bishops of the Isles
- Diocese of Sodor and Man
