= Small Countries Financial Management Centre =

Non-profit organisation

The Small Countries Financial Management Centre is a charity which was established in June 2009. It is, in effect, a "micro multilateral" body whose purpose is to help to contribute to the growth and prosperity of small states through capacity building in the government financial sector.

The countries involved (mainly those with a population of under 1.5 million) are:

Antigua and Barbuda, Barbados, Belize, Bhutan, Botswana, Cook Islands, Dominica, Fiji, The Gambia, Grenada, Jamaica, Kiribati, Lesotho, Maldives, Marshall Islands, Mauritius, Montenegro, Namibia, St Kitts and Nevis, St Vincent and the Grenadines, Saint Lucia, Seychelles, Timor-Leste, Tonga, Papua New Guinea, Samoa, Solomon Islands, Swaziland, Vanuatu.

The Centre is located at the Isle of Man International Business School. Its Executive Director is a former World Bank Chief Spokesman Tim Cullen MBE. Cullen, a Commissioner on the Isle of Man Financial Supervision Commission and an Associate Fellow at Oxford University's Said Business School was instrumental in creating the Centre’s Small Countries Financial Management Programme (SCFMP), an initiative which brings together officials from an extremely diverse range of small countries. Participants come from finance ministries, central banks and regulatory bodies. The programme offers a support mechanism through which they can exchange ideas, share their own countries’ challenges and give each other practical assistance. The acquisition of negotiation skills is a priority, and participants learn from leading practitioners and professors.

Partners of the Centre include the Isle of Man Government, the World Bank the Commonwealth Secretariat, and the Small States Network for Economic Development. Initial funding was provided by the Isle of Man Government.

The Centre’s inaugural nine-day programme, designed and directed by Ron Emerson took place in September 2009 at both the Isle of Man International Business School and Oxford University, and continues, covering key issues such as risk assessment, management and regulation, debt and cash management, and regulatory collaboration. The 2011 Programme was held in the Isle of Man and at St Catherine's College, Oxford and was directed by Alison McQuater.
