= Our Lady, Star of the Sea & St Maughold Church =

Church in Ramsey, Isle of Man

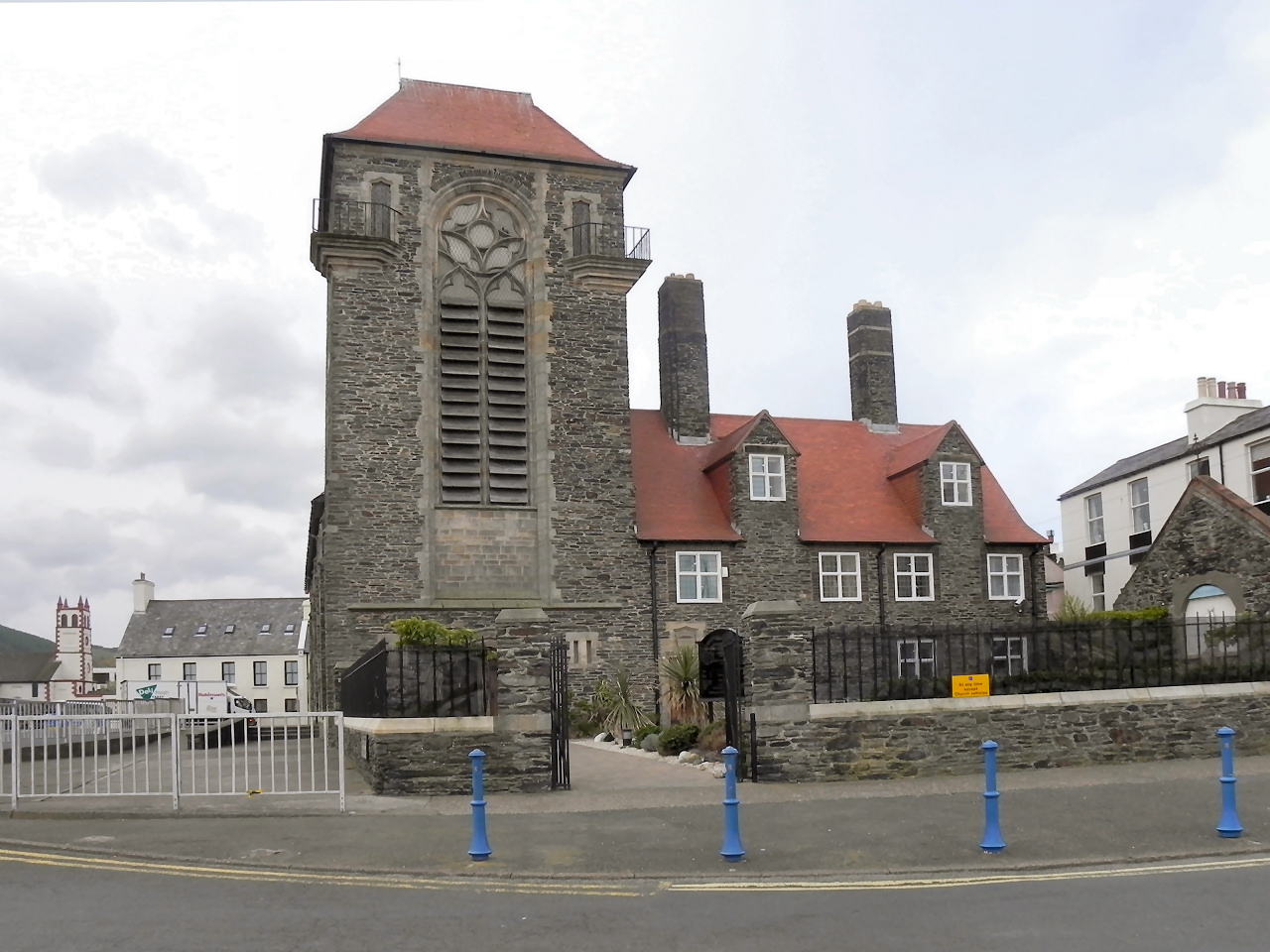

- Location within Isle of Man
- 54.32198°N 4.37828°W
- Location: Ramsey
- Country: Isle of Man
- Denomination: Roman Catholic Church

The Our Lady, Star of the Sea & St Maughold Church is the name given to a religious building that is affiliated with the Catholic Church in the Isle of Man and is located in Dale Street, in Ramsey the second largest town in the Isle of Man, a dependency of the British Crown.

The church follows the Roman or Latin rite and is under the administration of the Roman Catholic Archdiocese of Liverpool, based in the United Kingdom. Saint Maughold, to whom the church is dedicated alongside Our Lady, Star of the Sea, was a Catholic missionary, Bishop of Man, and patron saint of the Manx people who died in 498; his name can also be written, in Irish, as MacCuill, Maguil, or Maccul.

The church's history dates back to 1893 when a small chapel was opened. Over time more funds were built up and a new church began to be built to the designs of Giles Gilbert Scott in 1909; it was completed the following year. The reredos was created by Frances Bessie Burlison.

It is one of the Registered Buildings of the Isle of Man.

== See also ==
- Roman Catholicism in the Isle of Man
- Our Lady Star of the Sea Church (disambiguation)
