= Priory of Douglas =

Monastery of nuns on the Isle of Man

Coordinates: 54.1484°N 4.4947°W

The former Priory of Douglas was a Cistercian monastery of nuns on the Isle of Man, apparently founded in the reign of Rǫgnvaldr Guðrøðarson, King of the Isles.

== History ==
The priory appears to have been founded by Rǫgnvaldr Guðrøðarson, King of the Isles. A 16th-century record of a 15th-century inquisition states as such, although nothing else is known of the house's foundation. The priory was visited by Robert I, King of Scotland in 1313. The priory was suppressed in 1540, in the course of the Dissolution of the Monasteries undertaken by Henry VIII, King of England. At that point in time, the community consisted of the prioress and three nuns.

== Baroness of Douglas ==
The prioress of the monastery also held the title of Baroness of Douglas. This was a secular title of nobility which gave her extensive revenues from land holdings, as well as privileges almost matching those of the Lord of Mann. By virtue of this office, the prioress was able to hold court in her own name, to call her vassals back—even from the prison of the Lord of Mann—and to try them by a jury of her tenants.

All of the barons were occasionally summoned to Tynwald Hill to pay fealty to the Lord of Mann; if they did not appear within 40 days, they risked losing their lands and title. Historians recount that in 1422, Sir John Stanley, then Lord of Mann, summoned all eight barons. Three of the barons showed up, including the prioress and the Bishop of Sodor and Man (also a baron), but several others did not, perhaps because they were off the island, and this likely resulted in a loss of their lands.

The title ended with the suppression of the priory.

== Prioresses ==
- Katherine (c. 1349)
- Margaret Goodman; daughter of William Goodman, Esq, of Chester; married 1536 to Robert Calcot, Comptroller of the Isle of Man in 1538.

== Post-dissolution ==
After the dissolution of the monastic community, its lands were seized by the Crown. In 1609 they were leased to the Lord of Man.

Some of the former lands of the priory became a private estate known as the Nunnery, which was occupied by the descendants of Calcot and his wife, the last prioress. By the 18th century, an inn had been established on the site. Currently it serves as the headquarters of the Isle of Man International Business School.
