= Diocese of Sodor and Man =

Diocese of the Church of England

Coordinates: 54°13′N 4°32′W

Diocese of Sodor and Man Dioecesis Sodorensis et Monensis Aspickys Sodor as Vannin
- Coat of arms

Location
- Country: Isle of Man
- Ecclesiastical province: York
- Archdeaconries: Man
- Deaneries: Castletown, Douglas, Peel, Ramsey

Statistics
- Parishes: 15 (in 14 benefices)
- Churches: 43

Information
- Denomination: Church of England
- Cathedral: Peel Cathedral
- Language: English; Manx

Current leadership
- Bishop: Tricia Hillas, Bishop of Sodor and Man
- Archdeacon: Irene Cowell, Archdeacon of Man

Map
- Isle of Man location relative to Great Britain and Ireland; Sodor and Man encompasses the entire island.

Website
- sodorandman.im

The Diocese of Sodor and Man is a diocese of the Church of England. It is one of only two Church of England dioceses not within the United Kingdom (the other is the Diocese in Europe). Originally much larger, today it covers just the Isle of Man and its adjacent islets. Today, the bishop's office is in Douglas and the cathedral is in Peel. The diocese is not generally called either "Sodor diocese" or "Man diocese".

== Structure ==
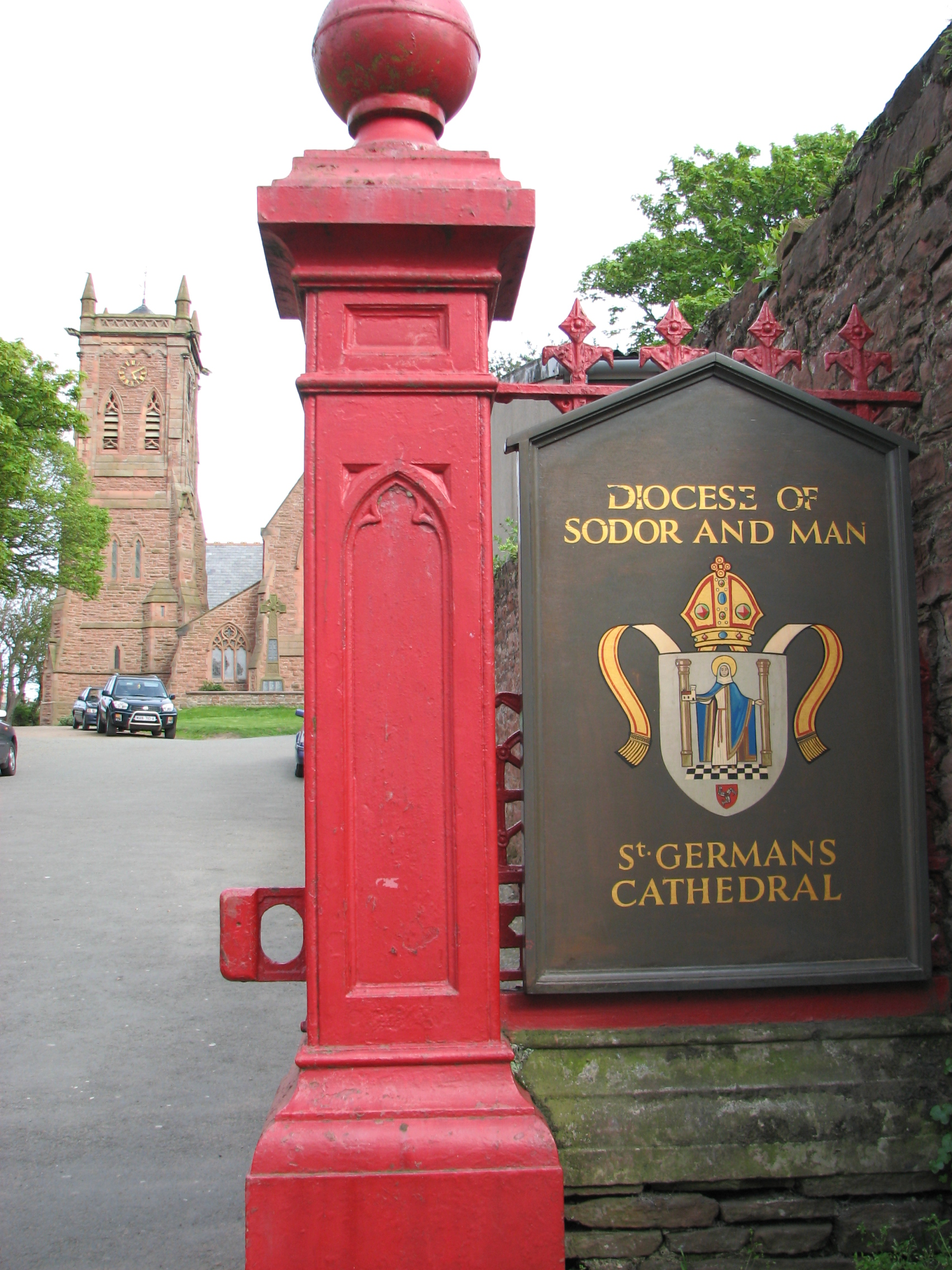
Arms of the diocese at Peel Cathedral

The diocese administers 40 churches, which are organised in 15 ecclesiastical parishes. Formerly there were 27 such parishes, but their number has been reduced by extensive pastoral reorganisation between 2012 and 2015. Each parish forms a separate benefice, with the exception of two (Onchan; Lonan and Laxey) which are combined in a team ministry with a team rector and a team vicar. The Archdeacon of Man is the incumbent (vicar) of the parish of St George and All Saints, Douglas.

The Cathedral Church of St German at Peel (informally styled Cathedral Isle of Man) is one of five churches in the parish of the West Coast, the incumbent (vicar) of which is ex officio Dean of the Cathedral.

The parishes are grouped into four "Mission Partnerships" (Eastern, Western, Southern and Northern) for purposes of mission and inter-parochial co-operation. Originally informal (from 2010), these mission partnerships became legal entities on 1 January 2013 under the Mission and Pastoral Measure (Isle of Man) 2012. They have completely replaced the traditional rural deanery structure, and the former deaneries and the office of rural dean have been legally abolished. Each mission partnership has a team leader appointed by the bishop from amongst the constituent clergy.

In addition to the parish clergy, the bishop licenses a few ordained chaplains. These include the school chaplain of King William's College (where there is an Anglican chapel, with scissor-braced roof with canopied stalls designed by James Cowle), and the hospital chaplain of the island's main Noble’s Hospital, where an interdenominational chapel is staffed by the Anglican chaplain together with two colleagues, one Roman Catholic, and one Free Church.

== Early history ==
The Kingdom of Mann and the Isles about the year 1100. Sodor and Mann in red.

The Norwegian diocese of Sodor was formed in 1154, covering the Hebrides and the other islands along the west coast of Scotland. The name in the original Norse was Suðreyjar (Sudreys or "southern isles"), in contrast to the Norðreyjar, the "northern isles" of Orkney and Shetland. The Isle of Man was included in with these southern isles. This diocese was a suffragan of the archdiocese of Nidaros (Trondheim).

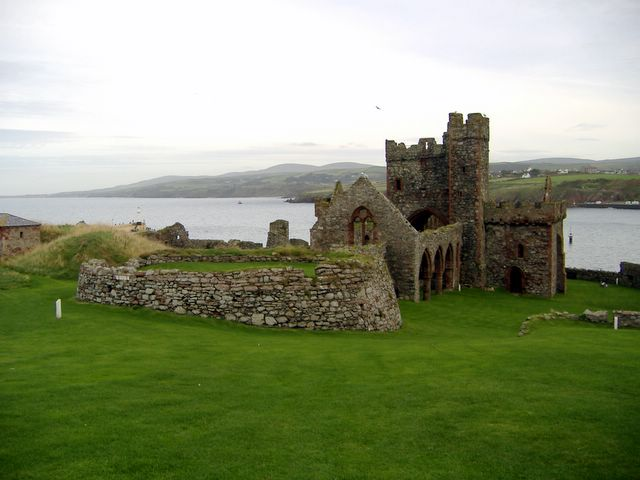
Original Peel Cathedral

Norway controlled all these islands until 1266, when they were ceded to Scotland. The Isle of Man was detached from the Scottish islands and came under the suzerainty of the Kings of England in 1334. Thereafter it was held by feudal Lords of Man (the Stanleys, Earls of Derby, from 1406 to 1736 and the Dukes of Atholl from 1736) until the lordship was purchased by the British Crown in 1765. The right to appoint the Bishop of Sodor and Man belonged to the Lords of Man, and continued to be exercised by the Dukes of Atholl after the revestment in 1765 until it was surrendered to the Crown in 1828. The Isle of Man was never incorporated into the Kingdom of England, or the United Kingdom, but is a Crown Dependency. In common with the rest of the Church of England, at the English Reformation the Diocese left the Roman Catholic Church under Henry VIII. The bishop Thomas Stanley was not a supporter of the reforms (particularly the reallocation of his Diocese from the Province of Canterbury to the Province of York in 1542) and was deprived of office by Henry, but was briefly reinstated under Mary I, who restored Stanley to office, but was separated once again under the religious settlement under Elizabeth I. Since the Isle of Man was not part of the Kingdom of England, the Act of Uniformity 1662 passed at the English Restoration did not apply to it, so Thomas Wilson was free to introduce worship in the Manx language during his episcopate (1697–1755), and to resolve issues of clergy discipline resulting from the Isle of Man's unique status.

== Usage of Sodor and Man ==
As stated above, the Isle of Man was included in the Southern islands ("Sudreys"); the addition of "and Man" may have been made in the 17th century in ignorance of the proper application of the name of Sodor to the bishopric of Man. It is suggested that St Patrick's Isle, being the location of the cathedral for the Norse diocese of Sodor, by some confusion itself became known as Sodor. By the late 16th century the terms "Sodor" and "Man" had become interchangeable, the bishopric being named in legal documents as "Sodor" or "Man" or "Sodor and Man", or sometimes all three, for the avoidance of doubt (e.g. the grant of the lordship of the Island to the Earl of Derby in 1610 included "the Patronage of the Bishopricke of the said Isle of Mann, and the Patronage of the Bishopricke of Sodor, and the Patronage of the Bishopricke of Sodor and Mann").

Until 1604 the bishops signed themselves "Sodorensis"; from 1604 to 1684, sometimes they used "Soderensis" and sometimes "Sodor and Man"; between 1684 and 2007 all bishops signed "Sodor and Man" or "Sodor and Mann". However, the present bishop signs "Sodor as Mannin", the Manx Gaelic equivalent, as did her predecessor.

== Later history ==
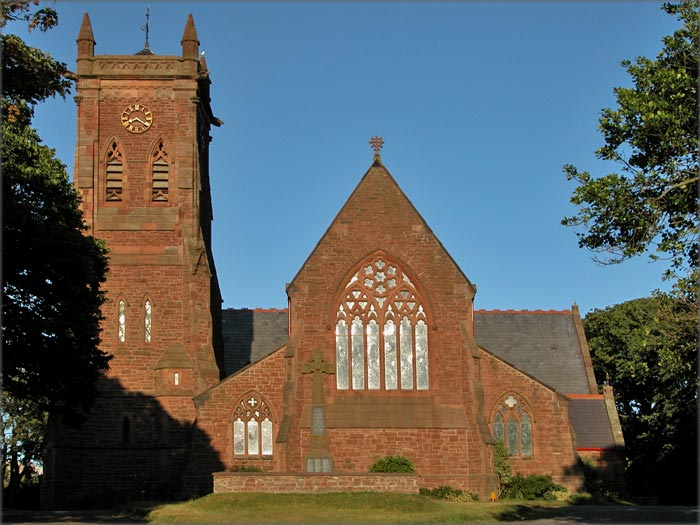
The modern Peel Cathedral

The original cathedral of the Diocese of Sodor and Man was on St Patrick's Isle at Peel. This cathedral fell into disuse during the 18th century and for many years the bishop's chapel at Bishopscourt, near Kirk Michael, served as a pro-cathedral. This was a Gothic building, rebuilt in 1814 and again in 1858, and dedicated to St Nicholas. In 1979 Bishopscourt was sold, and the following year the parish church of St German in Peel was designated as "the Cathedral Church of St German" by Act of Tynwald.

An 1836 proposal to subsume the diocese into the Diocese of Carlisle was defeated, as was the 1875 proposal that the Diocese of Liverpool (then at the planning stage, founded 1880) should include the Isle of Man.

Since the Isle of Man is not part of the United Kingdom, the bishop is never a Lord Spiritual and cannot sit in the House of Lords of the United Kingdom. However, he is an ex officio member of the Legislative Council of the Isle of Man. Nevertheless, in common with other Church of England Crown Appointments, the appointment of the bishop is still made on the advice of the prime minister of the United Kingdom. However, unlike diocesan bishops in England, who are formally elected by the canons of the cathedral church in accordance with the monarch's congé d'elire, the Bishop of Sodor and Man is appointed directly by the monarch by letters patent.

== List of churches ==
Last fully updated 18 September 2018.

=== Statistics ===
Paid clergy	Churches	Population served	People/clergy	People/church	Churches/clergy
12	31	83,314 (2016 census)	6,942	2,687	2.6

=== Eastern Mission Partnership ===
Benefice	Churches	Link	Clergy
Braddan	Kirk Braddan (St Brendan); Old Kirk Braddan (St Brendan)		Vicar: Daniel Richards; Associate Vicar: Joanna Fisher
St George and All Saints, Douglas	St George, Douglas		Vicar: Irene Cowell; Assistant Priest: Andrew Coleman; Assistant Curate: Ian Quayle
St Matthew, Douglas	St Matthew the Apostle, Douglas		Priest in Charge: Michael Brydon; Assistant Priest: Andrew Coleman
St Ninian, Douglas	St Ninian, Douglas		Vicar: Vacant; NSM: Johnny Guilford
St Thomas, Douglas	St Thomas the Apostle, Douglas		Vicar: Liz Hull
Onchan, Lonan and Laxey	St Peter, Onchan; Christ Church, Laxey		Rector: Alessandra di Chiara

=== Northern Mission Partnership ===
Benefice	Churches	Link	Clergy
The Northern Plain	Kirk Andreas (St Andrew); St Jude, Andreas; Kirk Ballaugh (St Mary the Virgin); St Mary de Ballaugh (Old Kirk Ballaugh); Kirk Jurby (St Patrick); St Stephen, Sulby		Rector: Vacant
Ramsey and the North East	Kirk Bride (St Bridget); St Olave, North Ramsey; St Fingan, Glen Auldyn; Kirk Maughold (St Maughold); Christ Church, Dhoon; St Paul, Ramsey		Rector: Vacant

=== Southern Mission Partnership ===
Benefice	Churches	Link	Clergy
Arbory and Castletown	Kirk Arbory (St Columba, Ballabeg); St Mary's on the Harbour, Castletown		Vicar: Simon Archer; NSM: Colin Barry
Malew and Santan	Kirk Malew (St Lupus); St Mary the Virgin, Ballasalla; St Mark, St Mark's; Kirk Santan (St Sanctain)		Vicar: Ruth Walker
Rushen	Kirk Christ Rushen (Holy Trinity); St Catherine, Port Erin; St Mary, Port St Mary; St Peter, Cregneash		Vicar: Joe Heaton

=== Western Mission Partnership ===
Benefice	Churches	Link	Clergy
Marown, Foxdale and Baldwin	Kirk Marown (St Runius); Old Kirk Marown (St Runius); St Paul, Foxdale; St Luke, Baldwin		Vicar: Janice Ward; Assistant Curate: Steve Herron
The West Coast	Cathedral Church of St German, Peel; St John the Baptist (Royal Chapel), St John's; Kirk Michael (St Michael & All Angels, Kirk Michael); Kirk Patrick (Holy Trinity, Patrick); St James, Dalby		Dean/Vicar: Nigel Godfrey; Curate: Mark Raadcliffe; NSM: Margaret Burrow; NSM: Jeanette Hamer; Lay Minister: Cheryl Cousins; Lay Minister: Karen Garrett

== In fiction ==
The Island of Sodor, the main setting of The Railway Series and the Thomas & Friends franchise, is named after, and part of, the diocese.

== See also ==
- List of churches on the Isle of Man
- Bishop of Sodor and Man
- Bishop of the Isles
- List of Church of England dioceses
- Sodor (fictional island)
