= Gylen Castle =

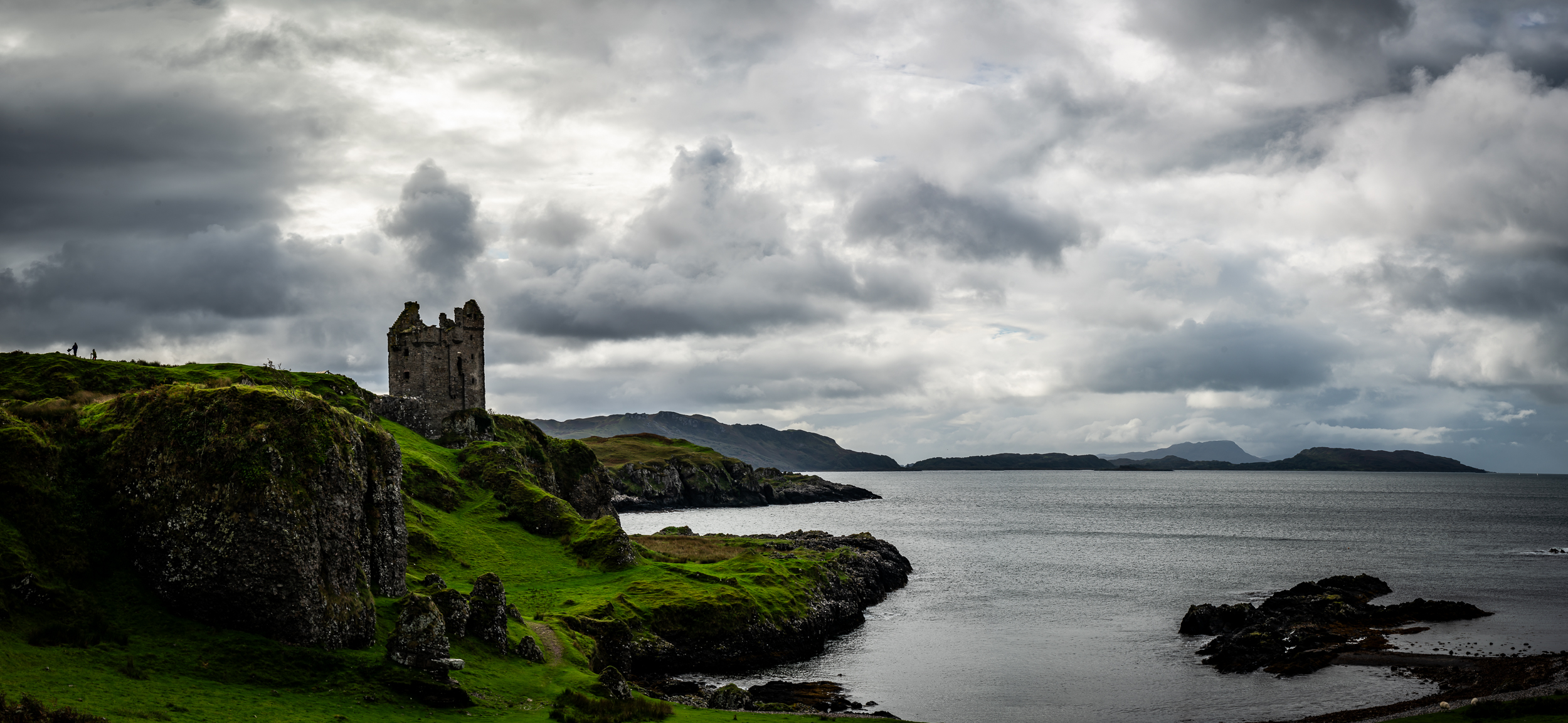
- The castle in 2023

- Location on Kerrera Location within Argyll and Bute
- 56.3794°N 5.5565°W
- Location: Kerrera, Scotland

History
- Original use: castle

Gylen Castle is a ruined castle, or tower house, at the south end of the island of Kerrera in Argyll and Bute, Scotland, on a promontory overlooking the Firth of Lorne. It was made a scheduled monument in 1931.

== History ==
Built in 1582 by the Clan MacDougall, Gylen was only occupied for a relatively short time. The castle was besieged then burned by the Covenanters under General Leslie in 1647 during the Wars of the Three Kingdoms.

In May 2006, extensive conservation of the castle was completed with a £300,000 grant by Historic Scotland and £200,000 raised by worldwide members of Clan MacDougall.

== Gallery ==
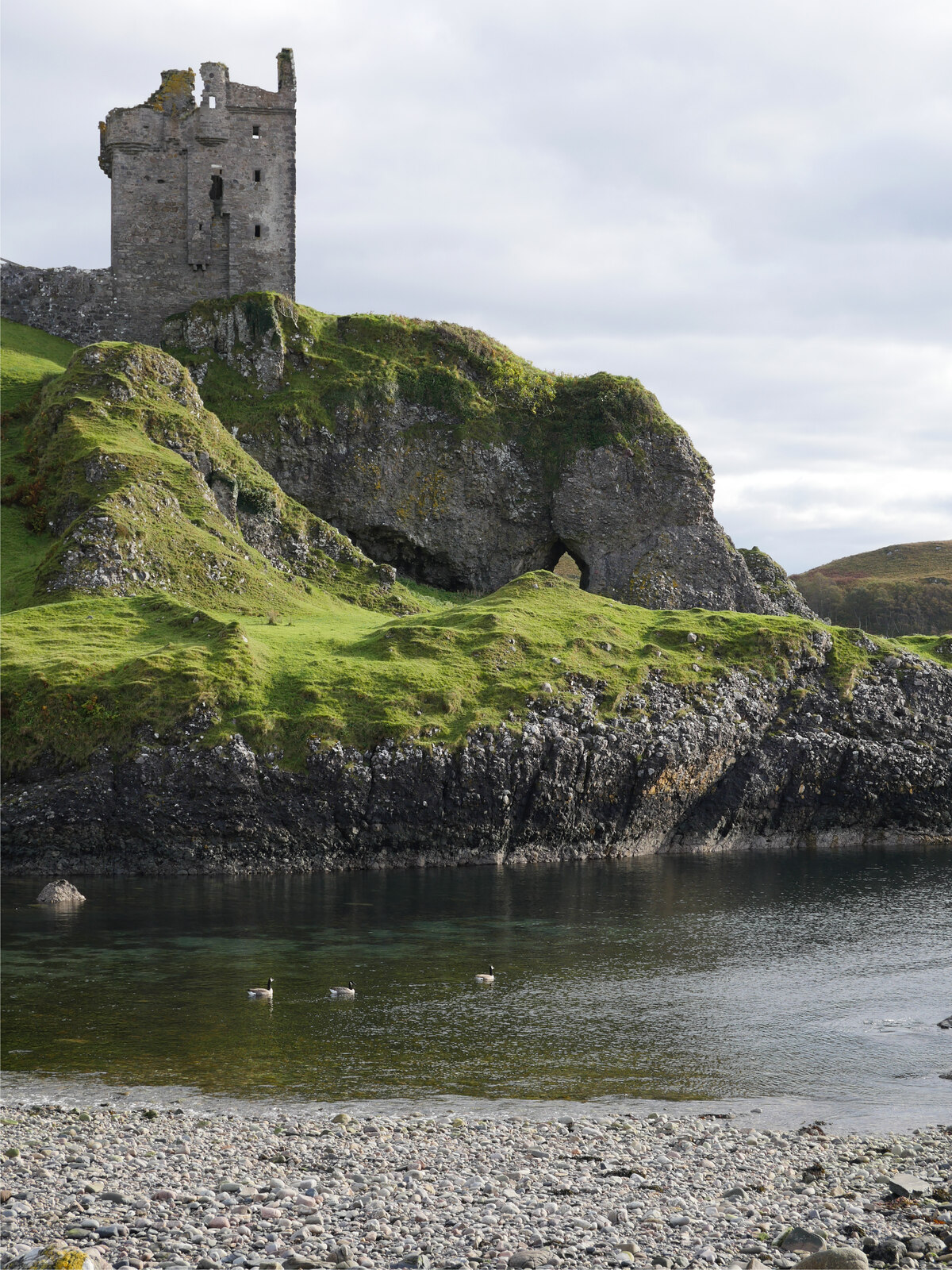
The castle in 2020

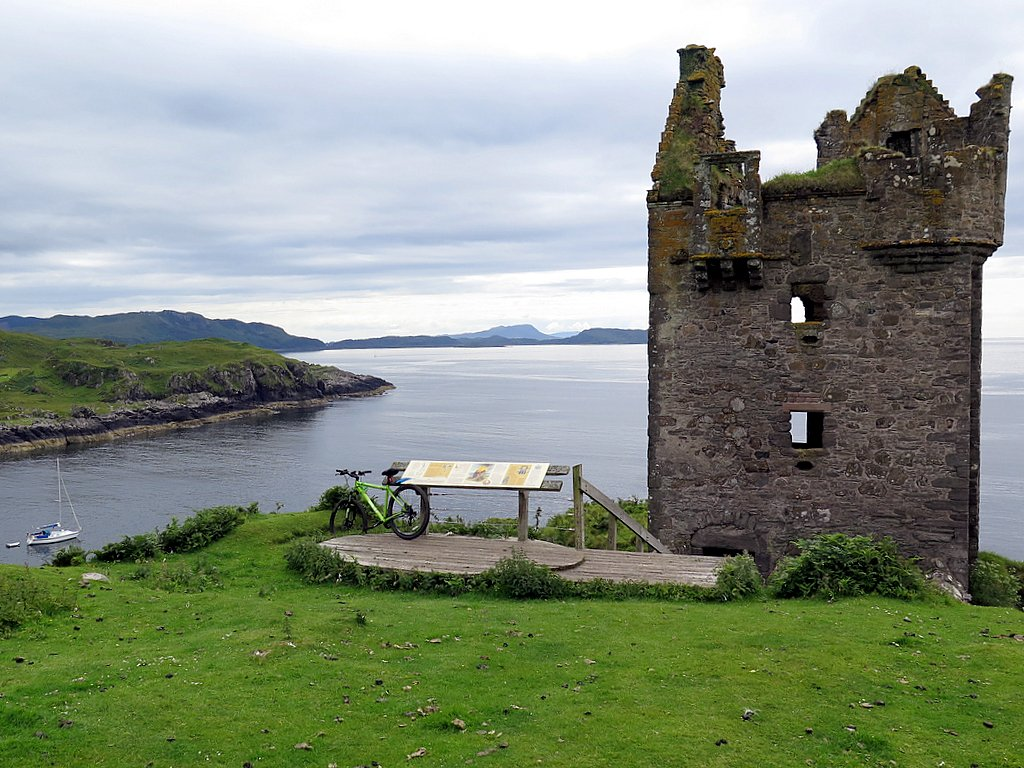
The castle in 2017

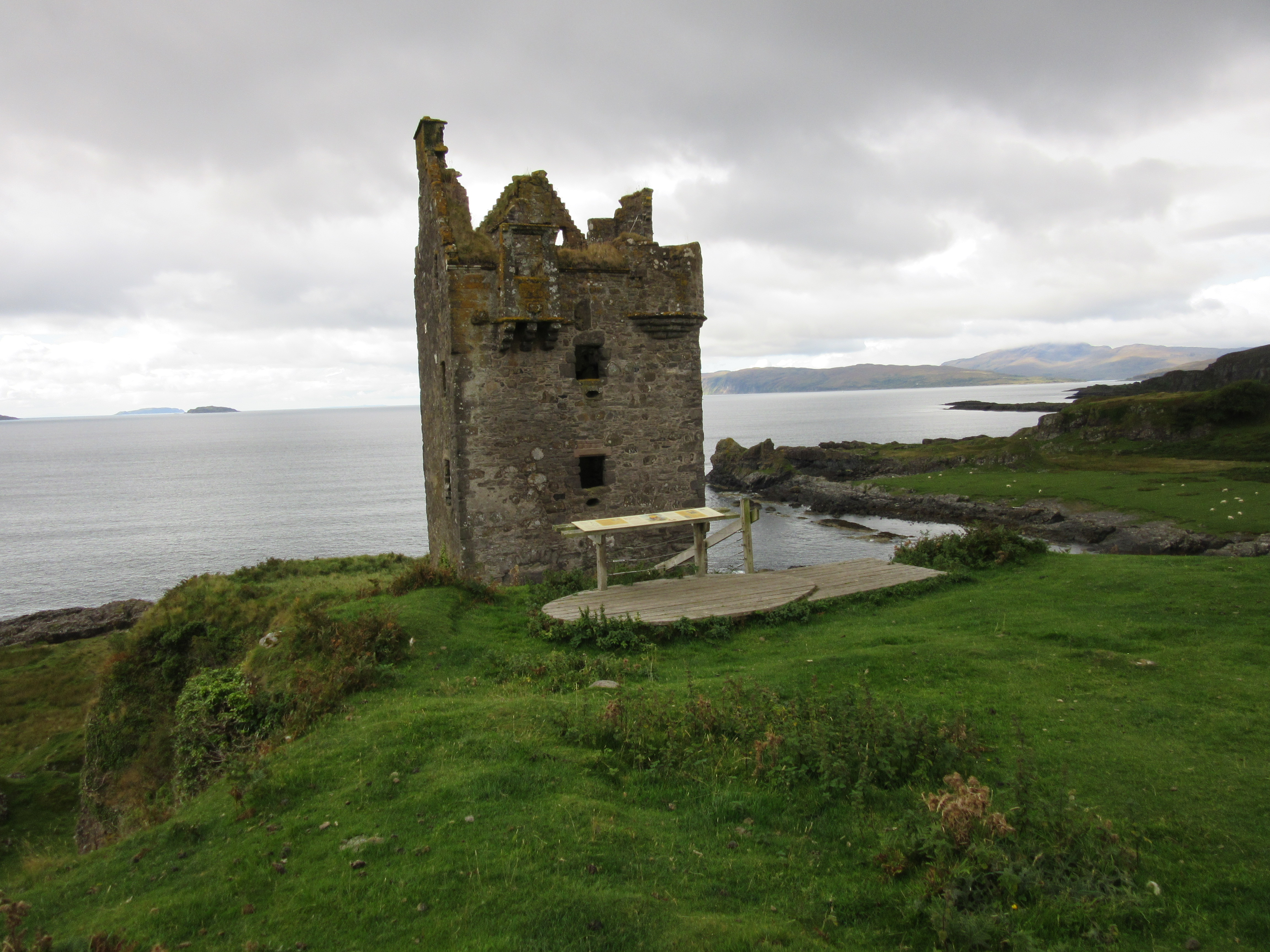
The castle in 2015

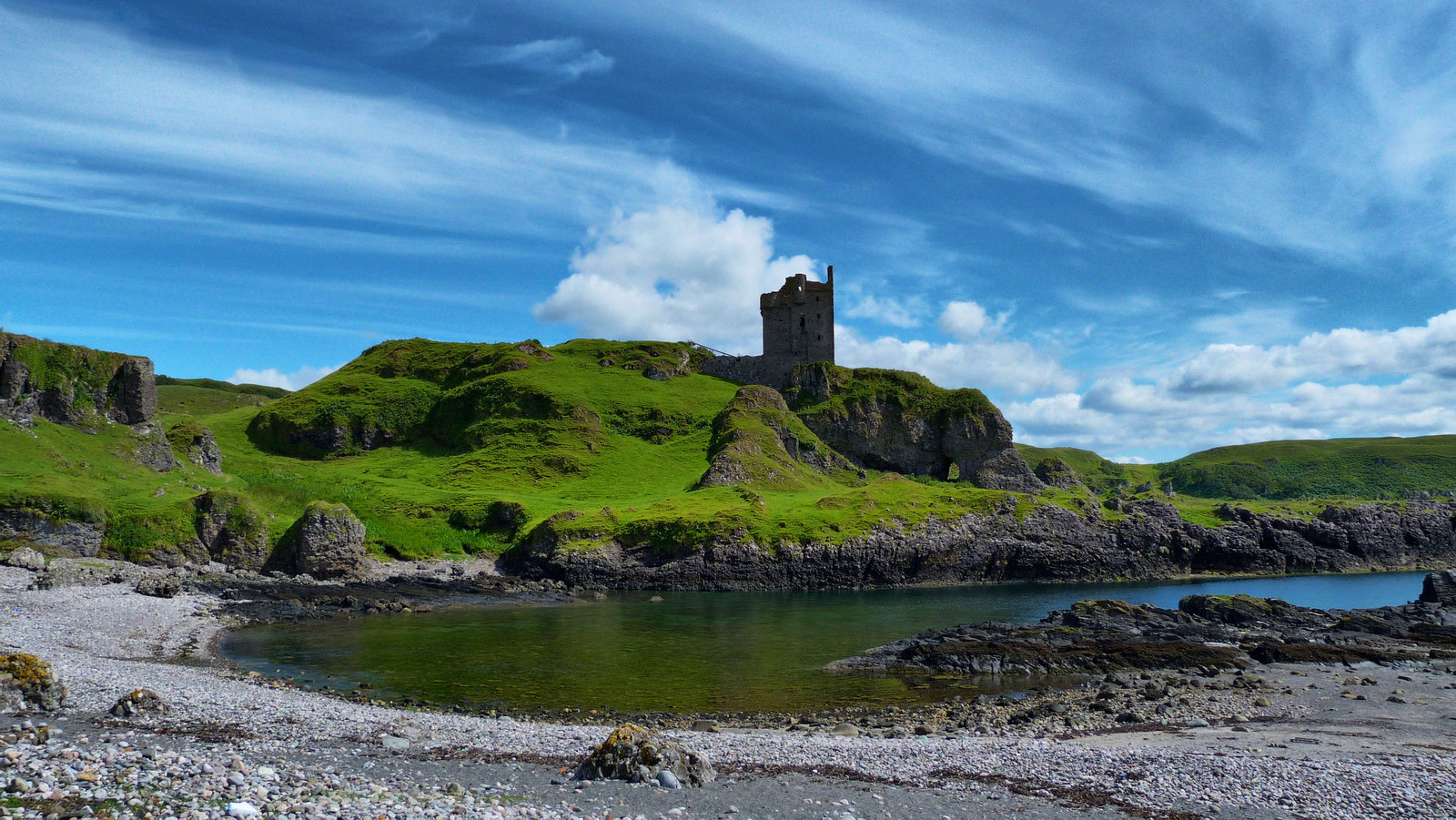
The castle in 2012

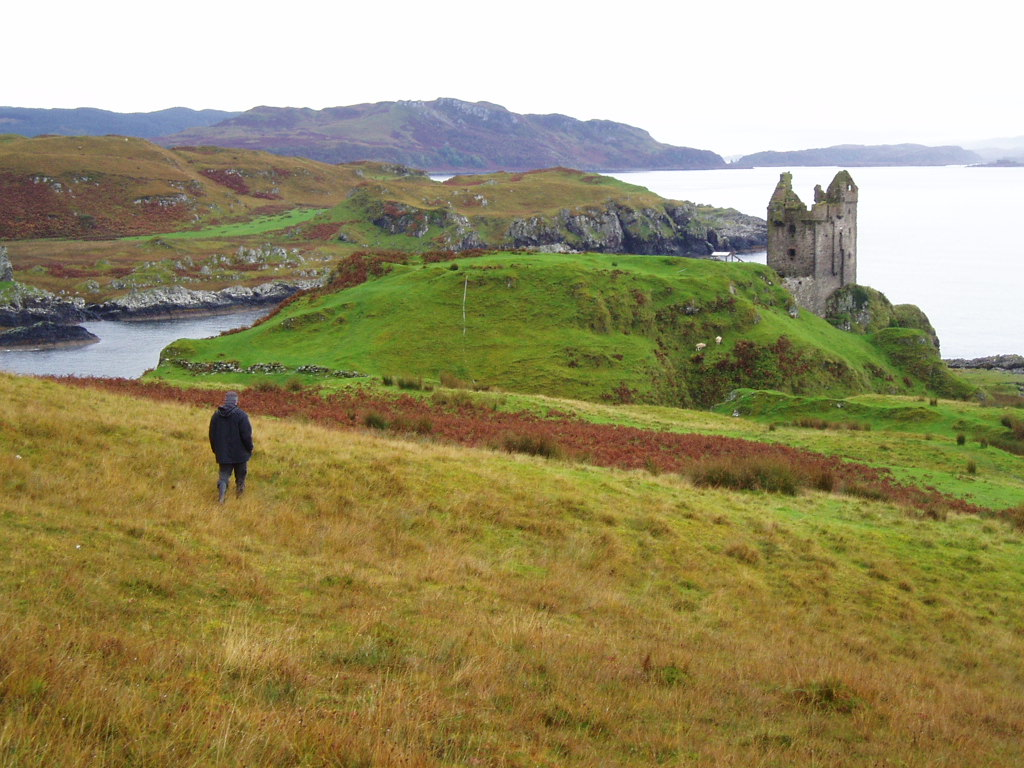
The castle in 2007

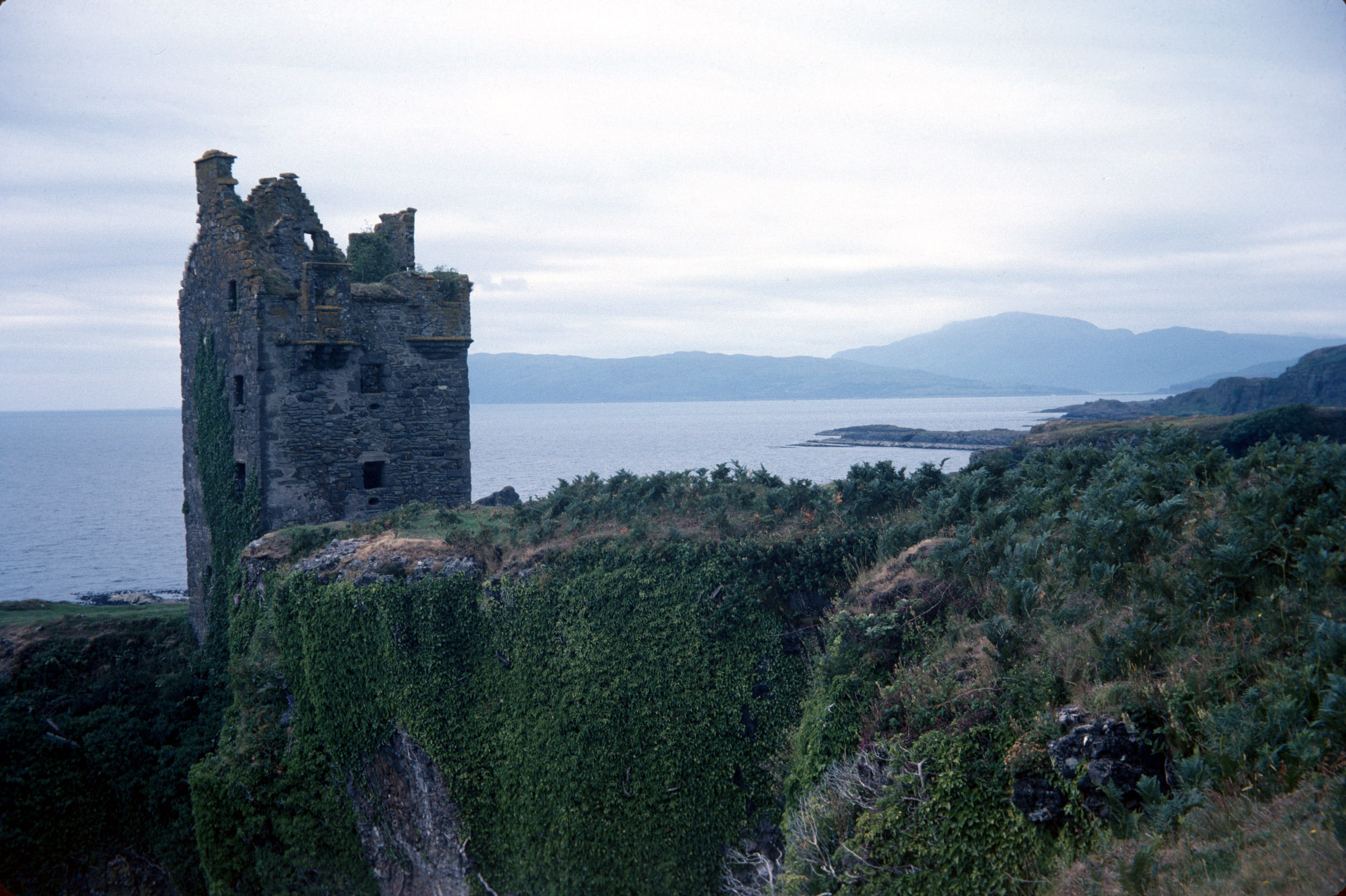
The castle in 1977
