= Lorne plateau lavas =

Silurian basaltic lava flows in Oban-Kerrera, Scotland

The Lorne plateau lavas are basaltic lava flows extruded in the late Silurian, 424 to 415 million years ago, which are found today in the Oban - Kerrera area of Scotland. Peperite occurs where they flowed into Old Red Sandstone lakes.
