= Frances Bessie Burlison =

- Born: 2 May 1875; St Pancras, London, England
- Died: 12 January 1974 (aged 98)
- Known for: sculptor, graphic artist

Frances Bessie Burlison (2 May 1875 – 12 January 1974) was an English sculptor, graphic artist and interior designer.

Burlison was born St. Pancras, London, and was daughter of John Burlison, of Burlison and Grylls, and Elizabeth Sarah Grylls, sister of his partner Thomas Grylls. She was educated initially by a governess and then at the Slade School of Fine Art in London.

Her first exhibited works were presented with The Society of Lady Artists in 1898. Burlison created the figure of Christ in the war memorial arch, by Giles Gilbert Scott, at Beaumont College in Old Windsor. Other works by her include the reredos at Our Lady, Ramsey.
