= St Patrick's Isle =

Tidal island on the west coast of the Isle of Man in the Irish Sea

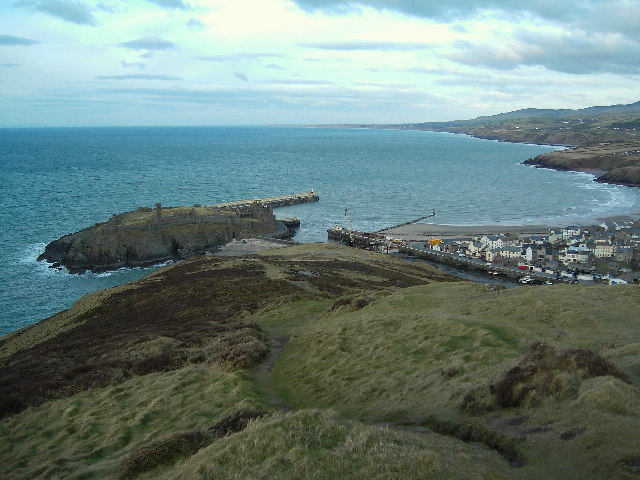
- St. Patrick's Isle and Peel Bay as viewed from Peel Hill
- Interactive map of St Patrick's Isle
- Etymology: Saint Patrick

Geography
- Location: Irish Sea
- Coordinates: 54°13′33″N 4°42′06″W
- Total islands: 1

Administration
- Isle of Man

Demographics
- Population: none

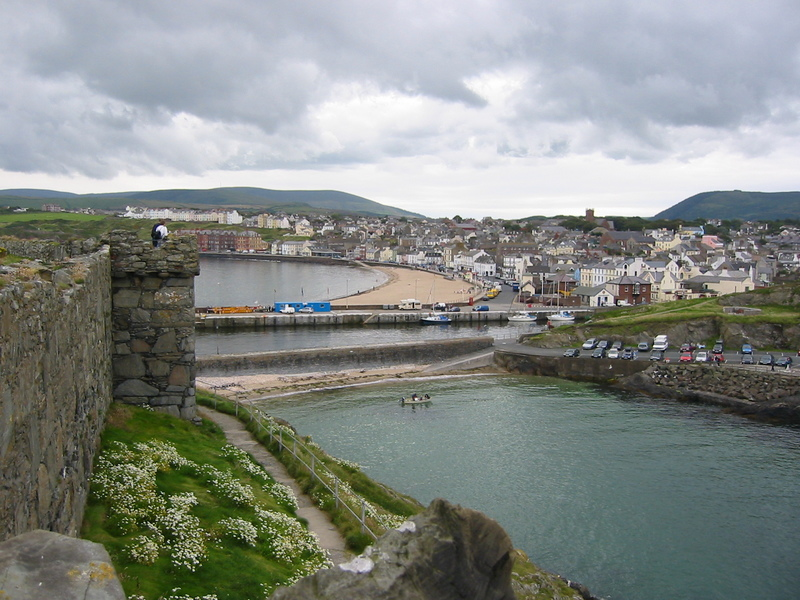
A view of the causeway connecting St. Patrick's Isle to Peel.

St Patrick's Isle (Manx: Ynnys Pherick) is a small tidal island on the west coast of the Isle of Man in the Irish Sea, largely occupied by the ruins of Peel Castle and of the Pre-Reformation Cathedral of the Diocese of the Isles.

== History ==
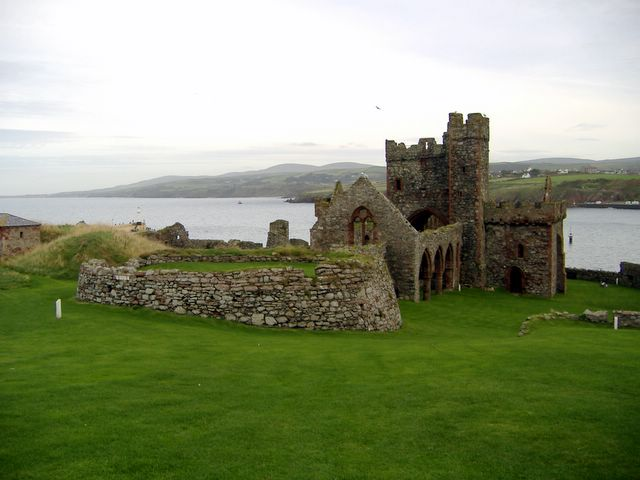
Ruins of the Pre-Reformation Cathedral of the Diocese of the Isles on St Patrick's Isle.

Archeological studies have shown permanent occupation on St Patrick's Isle dating to the Late Bronze Age. The ruins on St Patrick's Isle include St Patrick's Church and an Irish-style round tower, the former cathedral, and the more recent residence of the Lords of Mann.

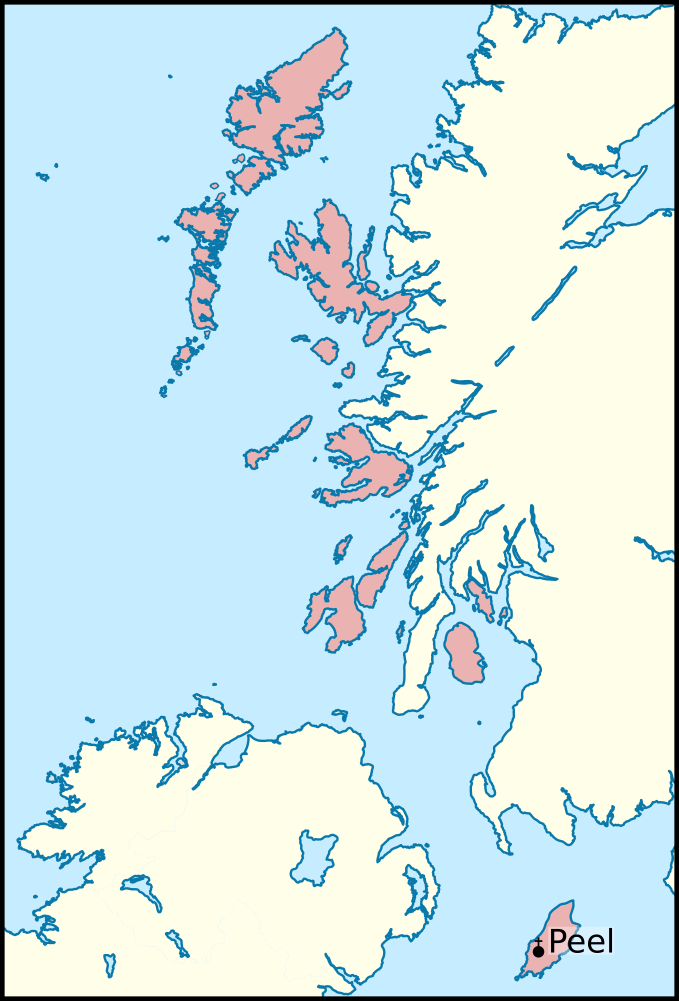
Extent of the Diocese of the Isles c.1300.

St Patrick's Isle is of significant importance to the history of the Celtic Church and the Catholic Church in Scotland. This is because, prior to the Protestant Reformation, the now ruined St Germanus of Man's Cathedral was the headquarters of the Diocese of the Isles, which in its full form included the Outer Hebrides, most of the Inner Hebrides (including Iona, Skye, Raasay, Canna, Eigg, Coll, Tiree, Mull, Colonsay, Islay, Jura, Gigha – but not Lismore, Kerrera, Seil or Luing, all under the Bishop of Argyll), the Isle of Bute and the Isle of Arran. The Diocese may have originally contained Galloway, a suggestion thought to explain the possible attacks of Wimund on Bishop Gilla Aldan of Whithorn.

The ancient cathedral, however, was left to decay in the 18th century, never to be rebuilt. The island's steep and rocky edges made it an ideal defensive outpost. It is said to be the place where St Patrick first set foot in the Isle of Man in 444 while returning from Liverpool to Ireland. Having established Christianity, he then appointed St Germanus of Man bishop, to oversee further development of the Church. However, there is debate as to whether the name "St Patrick's Isle" pre-dates the thirteenth century.

The islet is now a tourist site with the castle walls running close to the shoreline. There is a public walk around the outside of the castle, which lines the coastal edge of the islet. It is connected to the town of Peel on the Isle of Man by a causeway over Fenella Beach, named after the character in Sir Walter Scott's Peveril of the Peak. In addition to the historic ruins, the island is partially a sealife sanctuary.

St. Patrick's Isle was originally referred to as Inis (or Ynnys) Patraic in Manx.
