= The Nunnery, Douglas =

Estate on the Isle of Man

Coordinates: 54.148°N 4.494°W

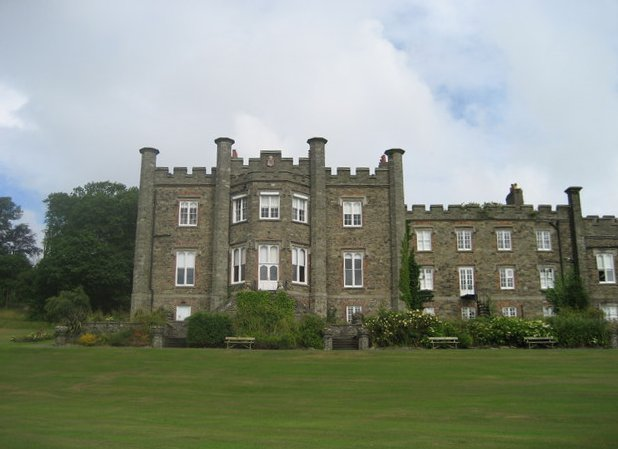
The Nunnery

The Nunnery is an estate outside of Douglas on the Isle of Man, named after a religious foundation on the site, at grid reference SC372754.

The Nunnery is located on Old Castletown Road, Braddan. In 1999, the estate was acquired for the Isle of Man International Business School, now part of the University College Isle of Man.

== History ==
=== Monastic era ===

The Priory of Douglas was a monastery of nuns, possibly dating to the reign of Rǫgnvaldr Guðrøðarson, King of the Isles (1187-1226). King Robert Bruce spent the night at the nunnery on Sunday, May 22, 1313 prior to beginning his siege of Castle Rushen the next day. He took the castle three weeks later. The nunnery was suppressed as part of the dissolution of the monasteries by King Henry VIII in 1540. Nothing remains of the monastery. In 1610, the Nunnery was granted to the Earl of Derby by King James.

=== Post Dissolution ===
Heywood's Estate Act 1776
- Act of Parliament
- Parliament of Great Britain
- Long title: An Act for vesting the Settled Estates of Peter John Heywood Esquire, in the Isle of Man, called The Nunnery, in Trustees, to be sold; and for laying out the Money arising by such Sale in the Purchase of Lands and Hereditaments, in that Part of Great Britain called England, to be settled in lieu of the said Estates in the Isle of Man, intended to be sold.
- Citation: 16 Geo. 3. c. 114 Pr.
- Territorial extent: Great Britain

Dates
- Royal assent: 23 May 1776
- Commencement: 26 October 1775 (Note: Start of session.)

Status: Current legislation

The buildings were acquired by Richard Calcot, Comptroller of the Isle of Man, who is said to have married the last Prioress, Margaret Goodman. The family occupied a house on the site until their descendants, the Heywoods, sold it to the Taubmans in 1776. A new mansion was built for John Taubman in 1823. It was designed by John Pinch the elder and his son, John Pinch the younger, of Bath, built in the "Strawberry Hill" Gothic Revival style. The only surviving monastic building, St. Bridget's Chapel, served as a coach house for centuries, but it was restored to its original use as a place of worship in the 1880s. The building was used in this manner until 1998, when new owners evicted the congregation, and it was deconsecrated as a chapel.

The mansion remained in the possession of the Taubman family: George Taubman Goldie was born here in 1846. This remained the case until the estate was acquired by the Isle of Man International Business School in 1999 to serve as their site of operations, following which the Isle of Man University Centre was established there in 2008. The Nunnery also served as the home of Culture Vannin until its relocation to St. John's in 2016. ]

== Sources ==
- David E. Easson, Medieval Religious Houses (Scotland), with an Appendix on the Houses in the Isle of Man (1957).
- Ian B. Cowan, David E. Easson, Medieval Religious Houses (Scotland), 2nd ed. (1976). ISBN 0-582-12069-1.
