= Tim Cullen (banker) =

British banker (born 1944)

Tim Cullen MBE
- Born: 23 March 1944 (age 82); Harlow, Essex, England
- Education: King William’s College, Isle of Man; Trinity College Dublin
- Occupation: Negotiator
- Organizations: Saïd Business School; World Bank
- Website: www.sbs.ox.ac.uk/about-us/people/tim-cullen-mbe

Tim Cullen MBE is a former chief spokesman and director of information and public affairs of the World Bank, and former executive director of the Small Countries Financial Management Centre. He is an associate fellow of the Saïd Business School at the University of Oxford, where he teaches the Oxford Programme on Negotiation which he founded. He was a senior associate member of St Antony's College, Oxford, from 2000 to 2016. He is a former commissioner for the Financial Supervision Commission of the Isle of Man Government.

In June 2014, he was awarded the MBE for services to international financial management.

== Early life ==
Born on 23 March 1944 in Harlow, Essex, he is the son of Brian Cullen CBE, who joined the British Embassy in Stockholm as commercial counsellor in 1957, and the brother of Dr Pat Cullen.

He was educated at King William's College, Isle of Man, gaining his MA from Trinity College, Dublin.

== Early career ==
From 1967 to 1969, Cullen taught English at Saint Edwards School, Florida, and joined Ford Motor Company Limited in 1969, where he worked in international media relations. In 1973, he transferred to the parent company in Dearborn, Michigan. From 1975 to 1978, Cullen headed the international public affairs unit at Continental Bank in Chicago.

== Career at the World Bank ==
Cullen spent twenty-one years at the World Bank working as the spokesman to the Washington Press Corps from 1978 to 1984, before becoming chief of external relations in the World Bank's European office in Paris.

In May 1990, he returned to the United States and worked as the Bank's chief spokesman until 1996.

In 1990, Cullen coined the expression 'a dollar a day' in reference to the World Development Report's finding that approximately one billion people lived on three hundred and seventy dollars per year. Both the written report and press conference employed this term.

From 1996 until 1999, Cullen served as senior advisor to the vice presidency of the World Bank's external and UN affairs department. From June to September 1997, he took on a special assignment as the World Bank's representative in Hong Kong.

From 1990 to 1998, he was a member of the joint United Nations Information Committee (JUNIC) In 2000, the Director-General of UNESCO appointed Cullen to be a member of a group of information and communication experts.

Cullen played an active role in the World Bank's work on the reconstruction of Bosnia and the transformation of the former Soviet Union countries into market economies.

== Post-World Bank career ==
Cullen managed the Asian Development Bank's Water Awareness Programme from 2002 to 2006. and moderated sessions at World Water Forums in Kyoto and Mexico.

He was involved in the creating the World Commission on Dams and co-ordinated the launch of its final report in November 2000.

Cullen is a regular commentator on World Bank affairs. He also comments on the challenges facing developing nations.

He advised the Growth Commission before the launch of their global Growth Report in 2008.

== Governance and ethics ==
Cullen is a former commissioner for the Financial Supervision Commission of the Isle of Man Government He is an executive director of the Small Countries Financial Management Centre.

He speaks regularly on the subject of governance and business ethics He was a trustee of the Institute of Business Ethics from 2006 to 2014.

== Negotiation ==
=== Teaching ===
Cullen is an associate fellow of the Saïd Business School, University of Oxford where he created the Oxford Programme on Negotiation with Sherman Roberts. Cullen continues to teach on the Programme. He is a professor of management practice at the Guanghua School of Management, Peking University, China. In 2010, Cullen visited Pyongyang where he taught negotiation to the United Nations' North Korea team. In 2018, he led a course on the art of cross-cultural negotiation in Bangkok, Thailand.

=== Commentary ===
Cullen has provided insight into trade, business and negotiation matters for many years. Between 2010 and 2017, he contributed to WUCF-TV's Global Perspectives where he discussed the challenges faced by small countries, effective negotiation techniques for politics, and doing business with China. In 2016 and 2017, Cullen made appearances on the BBC Radio 4 programme The Bottom Line as a trade deal expert. In the same years, Cullen published several commentaries on the Brexit negotiations.
