= Nigel Godfrey =

Manx Anglican priest (born 1951)

Nigel A. Philip Godfrey (born 25 April 1951) is an Anglican priest: he has been the Dean of Peel since 2011.

He was ordained after a period of study at Ripon College Cuddesdon in 1980. He was Curate at St John the Divine, Kennington from 1979 to 1989; and then Vicar at Christ Church, Brixton until 2001. He was the Principal Ordained Minister Training for the Diocese of Southwark from 2001 until 2007 when he became the Vicar and Vice Dean of St German's Cathedral.

Nigel Godfrey was appointed an MBE in the King's Birthday honours in 2025.

Church of England titles
Preceded by Robert Paterson as Bishop of Sodor and Man	Dean of Peel; 2011–present	Incumbent
