= Isle of Man International Business School =

Institution of education on Isle of Man

Coordinates: 54.14838°N 4.49591°W

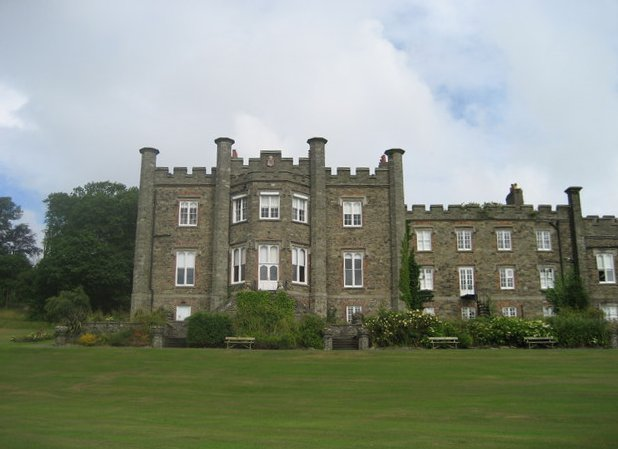
The Nunnery

The Isle of Man International Business School (Manx: Scoill Dellal Eddyrashoonagh Vannin) is a business school of higher education based at the Nunnery estate near Douglas, Isle of Man. Now part of University College Isle of Man, the school offers business-focused degree programmes and supports around 300 full-time and part-time students. Known for its small class sizes, international links, and strong student support, the school also hosts the Small States and Islands Research Centre, which promotes research on issues affecting small states and island nations.

== History ==
The Isle of Man International Business School started as the Douglas School of Art in 1880. In 1947, it became the School of Technology, Arts and Crafts and in 1960 the College of Further Education. The title "Isle of Man International Business School" was adopted in 1991. Following a merger in 2012, the building changed its use from a standalone institution into a campus of the Isle of Man College dedicated to higher education. In 2016, the college changed its name to University College Isle of Man.

The school is known in the local Manx language as "Scoill Dellal Eddyrashoonagh Vannin".

== Facilities and student experience ==
The Isle of Man International Business School is located in the Nunnery mansion estate, close to the island's capital Douglas. It is possible to rent affordable accommodation locally, comparable to the southeast of the United Kingdom, outside London.

The school is part of the Isle of Man's Higher Education Centre, offering a supportive and resource-rich environment for its approximately 300 full-time and part-time students. Although most students are local, the school also attracts a growing number of international students.

The International Business School benefits from the broader facilities of the Higher Education Centre, including a main campus equipped with over 300 computer terminals and a library housing more than 25,000 items relevant to its academic programmes. Within the school itself, students have access to two dedicated computer suites, campus-wide broadband and Wi-Fi, and comprehensive online access to academic journals and papers. The library includes all core textbooks as well as recommended additional reading materials.

Admission to business degree programmes at the Isle of Man International Business School typically requires a minimum of 240 UCAS points, with at least 160 from A-levels. However, applications are assessed on a case-by-case basis, and interviews are often part of the admissions process. All applicants must possess relevant A-levels or equivalent qualifications to be considered.

Students receive close academic support through a strong personal tutor system and small class sizes, which are taught by highly qualified and experienced lecturers. In 2010, 25% of undergraduate students graduated with first-class honours. The school also offers modern lecture theatres, well-equipped teaching rooms, and study spaces, and its catering facilities include services from an award-winning French chef. All degree courses are validated by Liverpool John Moores University or the University of Chester.

== Research ==
The Isle of Man International Business School hosts the Small States and Islands Research Centre, established to support research and dialogue on issues facing small states and island nations. Its first event, a workshop titled "Branding Islands and Small States: Challenges and Best Practices", was held in June 2010 at the Nunnery in Douglas. The workshop featured international experts in country branding, including Robert Govers, Alistair Audsley, Tim Cullen, and Wally Olins, and was attended by policymakers, academics, and business professionals.
