= Kerrera =

Island in the Scottish Inner Hebrides

Cearrara (Gaelic)
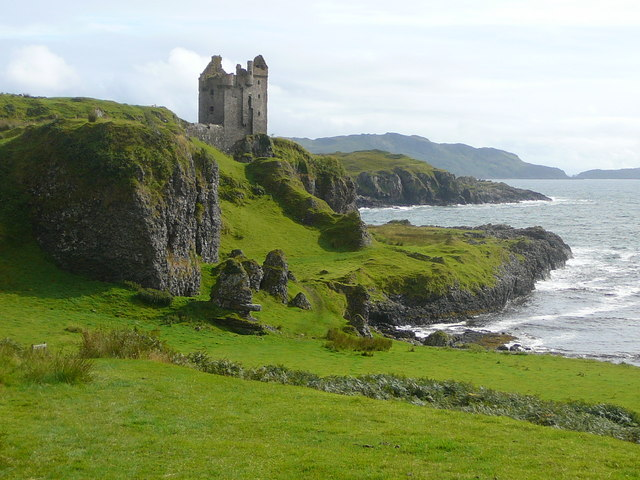
- Gylen Castle

Location
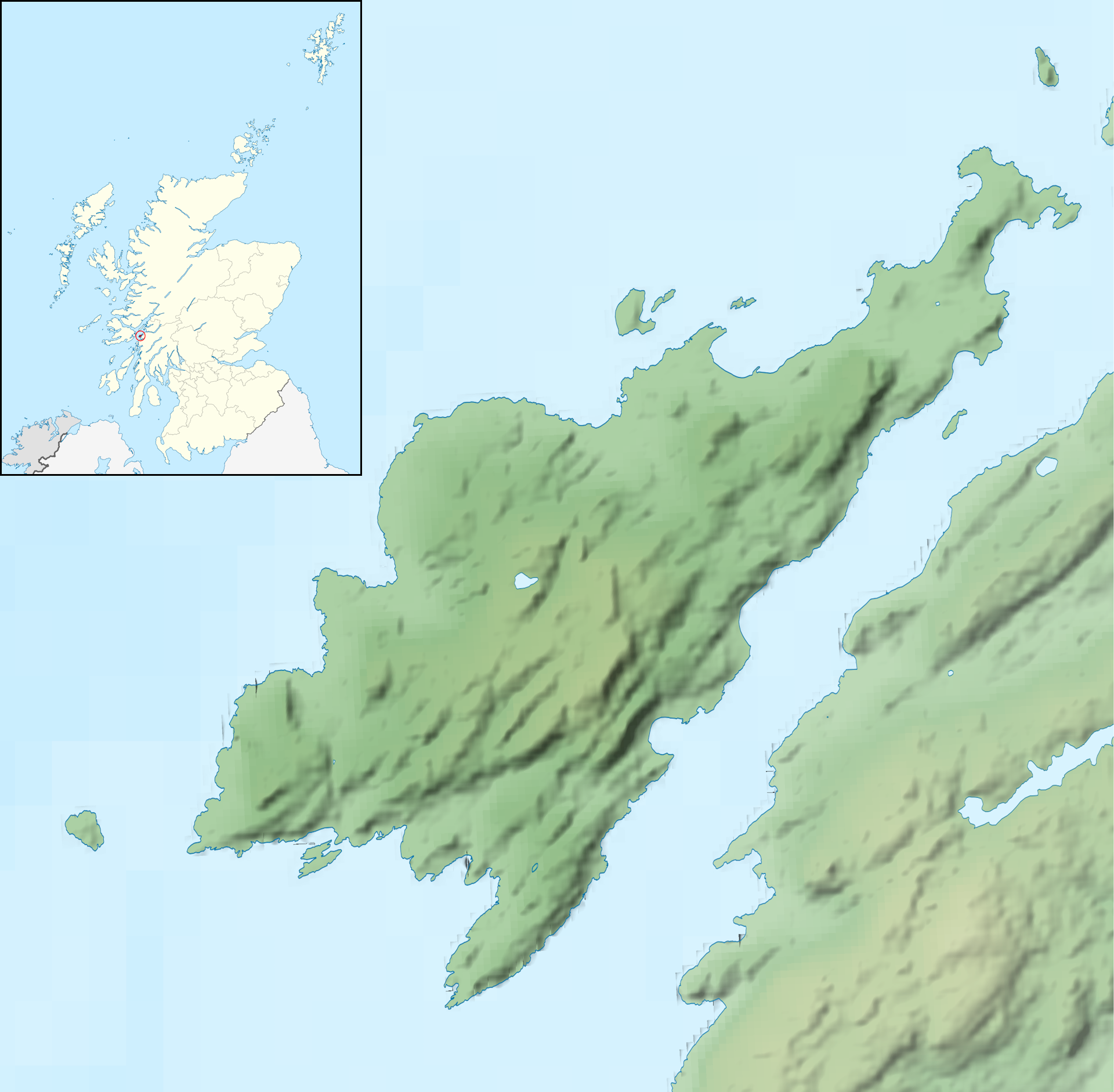
- Map of Kerrera & surrounding islands Kerrera shown within Argyll and Bute
- OS grid reference: NM813281
- Coordinates: 56°23′53″N 05°32′19″W

Name
- Gaelic pronunciation: [ˈkʲʰarˠəɾə]
- Name meaning: Norse for 'Kjarbar's island' or possibly 'copse island'
- Old Norse name: Kjarbarey

Physical geography
- Island group: Mull
- Area: 1,214 ha (4 5/8 sq mi)
- Area rank: 44
- Highest elevation: Carn Breugach 189 m (620 ft)

Administration
- Council area: Argyll and Bute
- Country: Scotland
- Sovereign state: United Kingdom

Demographics
- Population: 68
- Population rank: 51=
- Population density: 5/km^{2} (13/sq mi)
- Largest settlement: Balliemore

Kerrera (/ˈkɛrərə/ KERR-ə-rə; Scottish Gaelic: Cearara or Cearrara) is an island in the Scottish Inner Hebrides, close to the town of Oban. In 2016 it had a population of 45, divided into two communities in the north and south of the island. As of 2026, the population has grown to 68 full-time residents.

== Geography ==
The island is around 7 km (4 mi) long and around 2 km (1 1/4 mi) wide, and is separated from the mainland by the Sound of Kerrera, about 500 m (1/4 mi) wide. The highest point on Kerrera is Carn Breugach at 189 m (620 ft). The island is linked to the mainland by two ferry services. In the middle of the island, the Caledonian MacBrayne passenger ferry MV Carvoria operates from the Gallanach Road (about 3 km or 2 mi southwest of Oban). From the landing place, tracks lead to the scattered settlements in the centre and south of the island. The south end circular walking loop takes around 3 hours to walk. The northern tip of the island can be accessed by a separate marina ferry service operating from North Pier in the centre of Oban. The service runs to Oban Marina near Ardentrive Farm, which is now linked by a road to the rest of the island.

== History ==
The island is known for the ruined Gylen Castle, a small tower house built in 1582. It was also the place where Alexander II of Scotland died in 1249. The artist J. M. W. Turner visited Kerrera in 1831 and made 25 sketches of the castle which are in the Tate Gallery, London.

== Community ==
Most of the island is owned by the McDougalls of Dunollie, who are descended from the Norse-Gael Somerled. The four-acre (1.6 ha) tidal island at the north-east tip of Kerrera, Rubh a' Chruidh, was sold for £426,000 in 2010 to Lanarkshire businessman David Hamilton.

In the 2011 census, Kerrera had a population of 34. However in 2019, residents said that the population had doubled to 68 people, including 18 children. There are no public buildings or facilities on the island (apart from two compost loos provided by the community). In July 2019, the Isle of Kerrera Development Trust community organisation purchased the old primary school building, close to the public ferry slip near the centre of the island; the building had been empty and deteriorating since closing in 1997. The community plans to restore the building as a multi-functional centre.

The main industries on the island are farming (sheep and Highland cattle) and tourism. There was an exotic bird sanctuary, closed as of 2017. There is a tea room/café (Kerrera Tea Garden & Bunkhouse) at the south end near Gylen Castle but as of 2016 no shop and no pub. The castle itself was restored to some extent in 2006 and is open to the public.

In August 2021 work began to connect the small communities in the north and south of the island by road. A forestry track was initially constructed, and in October 2022 a metalled single track road was opened.

== Geology ==
The oldest bedrock of Kerrera is black slate ascribed to the Easdale Subgroup of the Dalradian Argyll Group. Overlying this across half of the island are conglomeratic sandstones and basalt and augite-andesite lavas of early Devonian age, the former being the local representative of the Old Red Sandstone and the latter constituting part of the Lorne Plateau Lavas. Ripple marks and sun cracks are preserved in shale strata on the south coast, belying the subaerial environment in which deposition of these sediments took place. There are thin limestones within both the Easdale Slate Formation and the younger sandstones. All of these strata are cut by NW-SE aligned igneous dykes forming part of the North Britain Palaeogene Dyke Suite associated with early Palaeogene volcanism. A number of geological faults cut across Kerrera, the majority are aligned NE-SW. Modern beach deposits and raised marine deposits of Holocene age are found around the island particularly on the north coast and along the Sound of Kerrera.

== Gallery ==
Outline map of Kerrera.

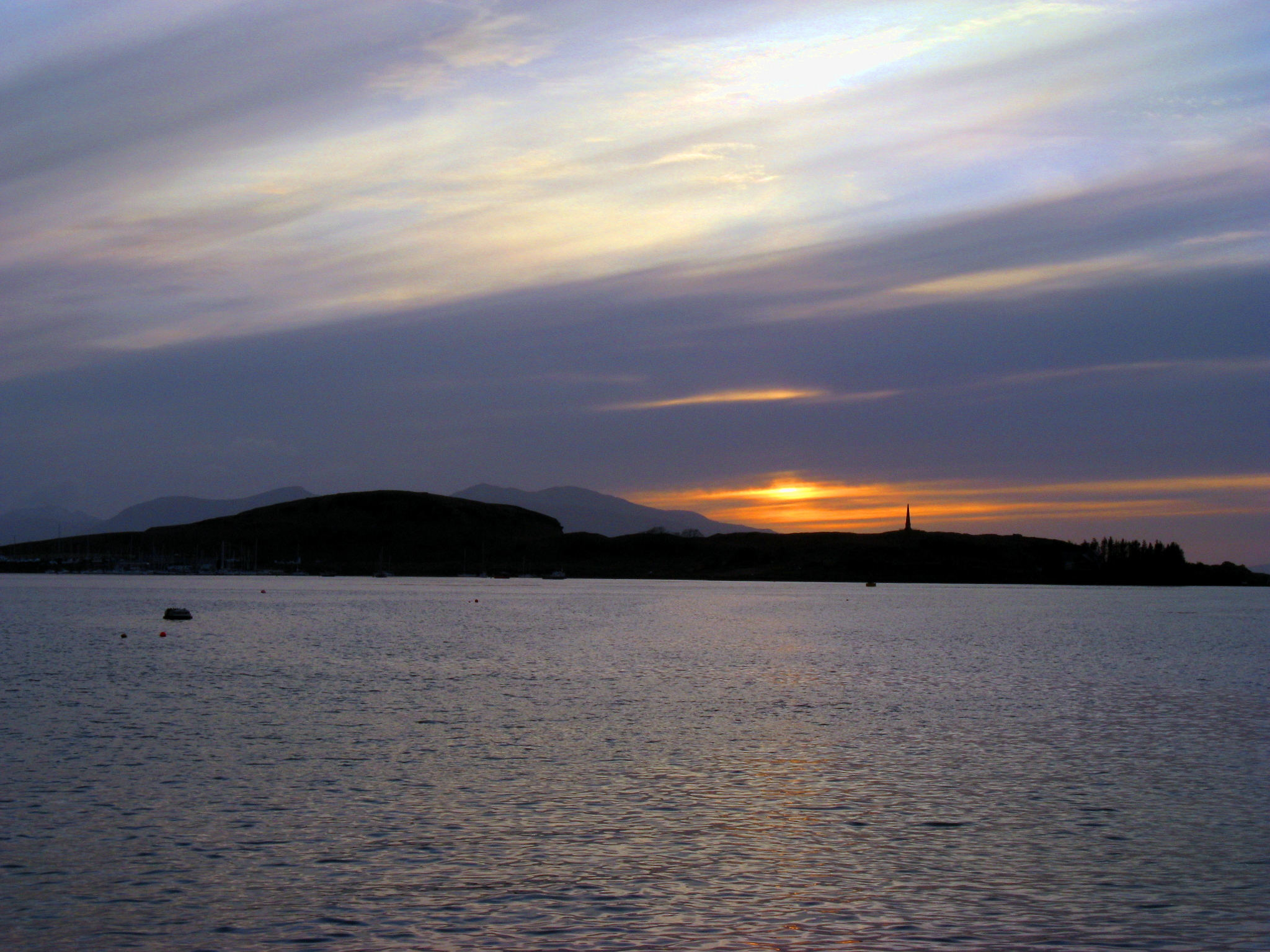
Sunset over Kerrera, viewed from Oban.

Disused school on Kerrera
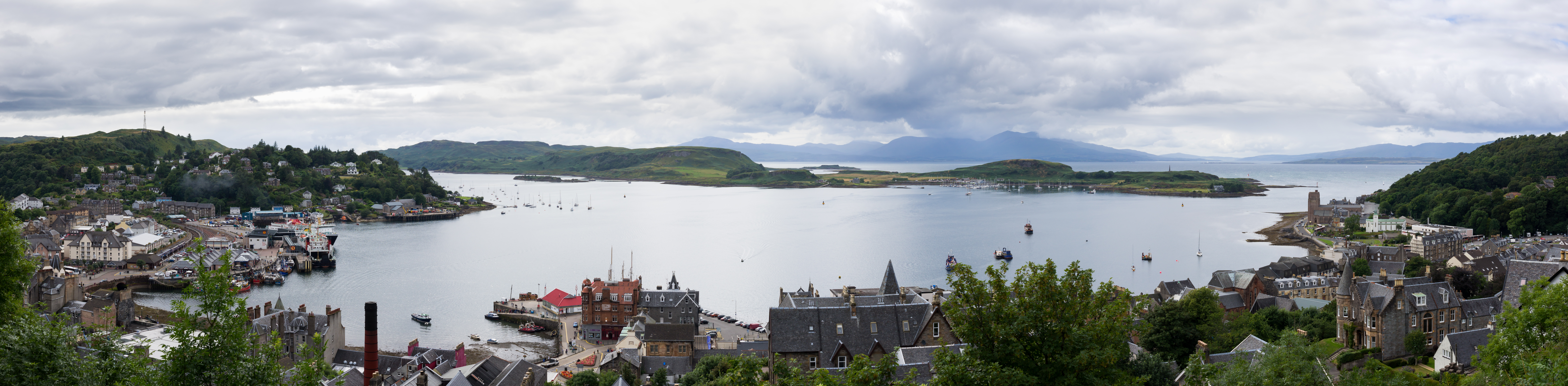
View of Kerrera from McCaig's tower in Oban

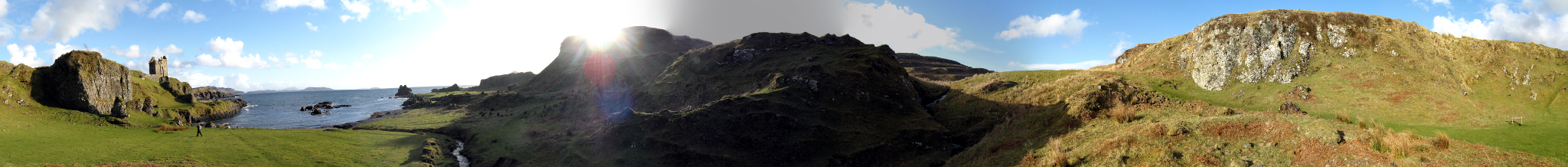
Landscape of the south of Kerrera showing Gylen Castle
