= Germanus of Man =

Bishop and saint

Saint Germanus of Man
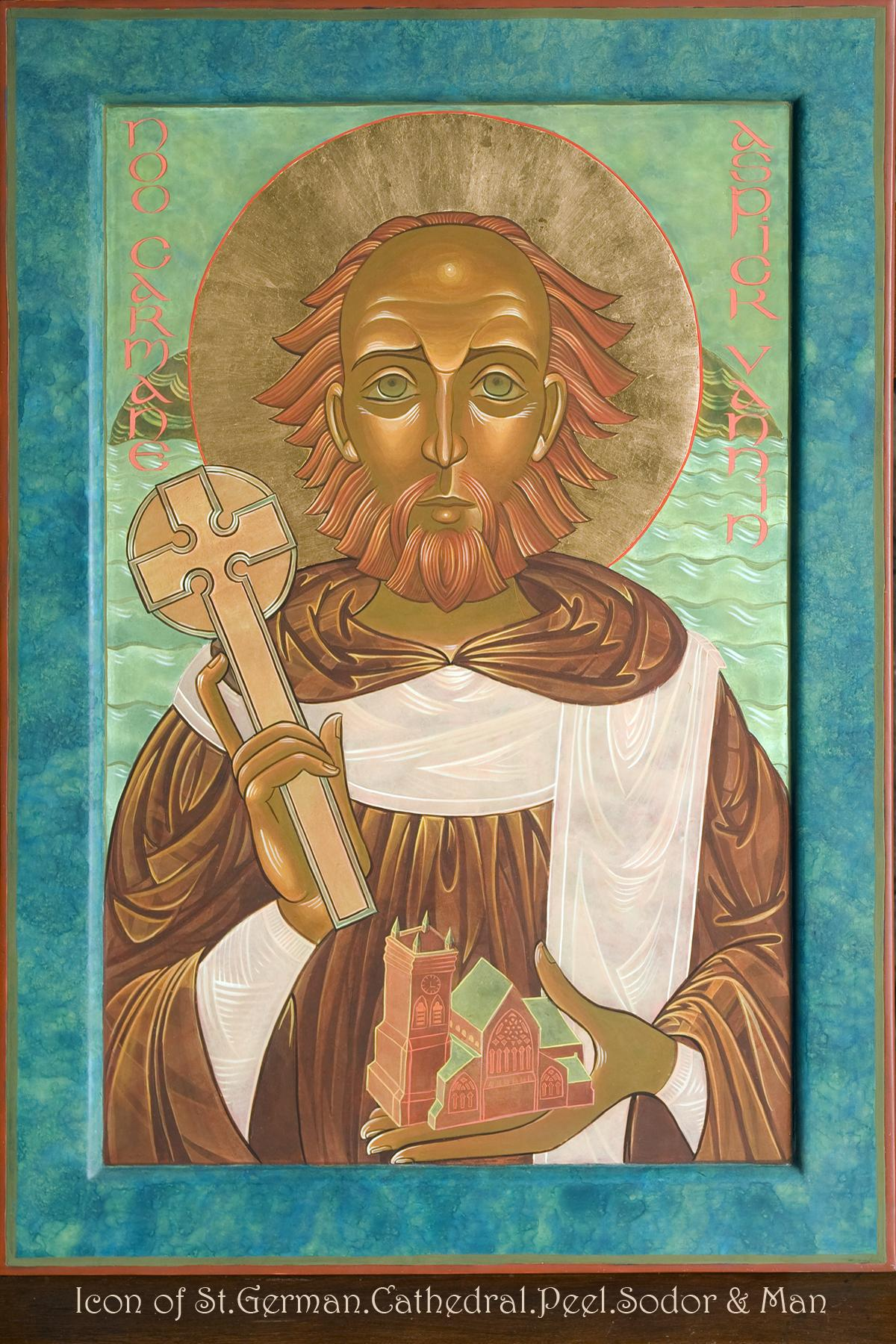
- Modern icon painting of Germanus
- Born: c. 410; Brittany
- Died: c. 474; Normandy, Western Roman Empire
- Venerated in: Eastern Orthodox Church; Roman Catholic Church
- Major shrine: Saint German of Peel
- Feast: 13 July

Saint Germanus of Man (Manx: Carmane; c. AD 410–c.474), also known as Saint Germanus of Peel, was the first Bishop of the Isle of Man.

Born in Brittany in the early fifth century, he travelled to Ireland to study with Saint Patrick, who may have been his uncle. Germanus later spent some time in St. Illtud's abbey in southern Wales before returning to Ireland to be ordained by Patrick, and sent to the Isle of Man as bishop. He is thought to have died in Normandy in the late fifth century.

In 2012 a bishop's seal was discovered buried in a field in the north of Man, bearing the inscription, "Let the prayers to God of Germanus and Patricius help us".

His main feast is 3 July, although in some places it is celebrated on 31 July. In Peel, St German's Day is celebrated ten days after his main feast on 13 July, possibly due to keeping the old Julian date following the switch to the Gregorian calendar (at the time a ten day difference). St German is patron saint of the island's cathedral.

There is some historical confusion with Saint Germanus of Auxerre, feast 31 July.
