= 1668 =

1668 in various calendars
- Gregorian calendar: 1668; MDCLXVIII
- Ab urbe condita: 2421
- Armenian calendar: 1117; ԹՎ ՌՃԺԷ
- Assyrian calendar: 6418
- Balinese saka calendar: 1589–1590
- Bengali calendar: 1074–1075
- Berber calendar: 2618
- English Regnal year: 19 Cha. 2 – 20 Cha. 2
- Buddhist calendar: 2212
- Burmese calendar: 1030
- Byzantine calendar: 7176–7177
- Chinese calendar: 丁未年 (Fire Goat); 4365 or 4158 — to — 戊申年 (Earth Monkey); 4366 or 4159
- Coptic calendar: 1384–1385
- Discordian calendar: 2834
- Ethiopian calendar: 1660–1661
- Hebrew calendar: 5428–5429
- Hindu calendars
- Vikram Samvat: 1724–1725
- Shaka Samvat: 1589–1590
- Kali Yuga: 4768–4769
- Holocene calendar: 11668
- Igbo calendar: 668–669
- Iranian calendar: 1046–1047
- Islamic calendar: 1078–1079
- Japanese calendar: Kanbun 8 (寛文８年)
- Javanese calendar: 1590–1591
- Julian calendar: Gregorian minus 10 days
- Korean calendar: 4001
- Minguo calendar: 244 before ROC 民前244年
- Nanakshahi calendar: 200
- Thai solar calendar: 2210–2211
- Tibetan calendar: མེ་མོ་ལུག་ལོ་ (female Fire-Sheep); 1794 or 1413 or 641 — to — ས་ཕོ་སྤྲེ་ལོ་ (male Earth-Monkey); 1795 or 1414 or 642

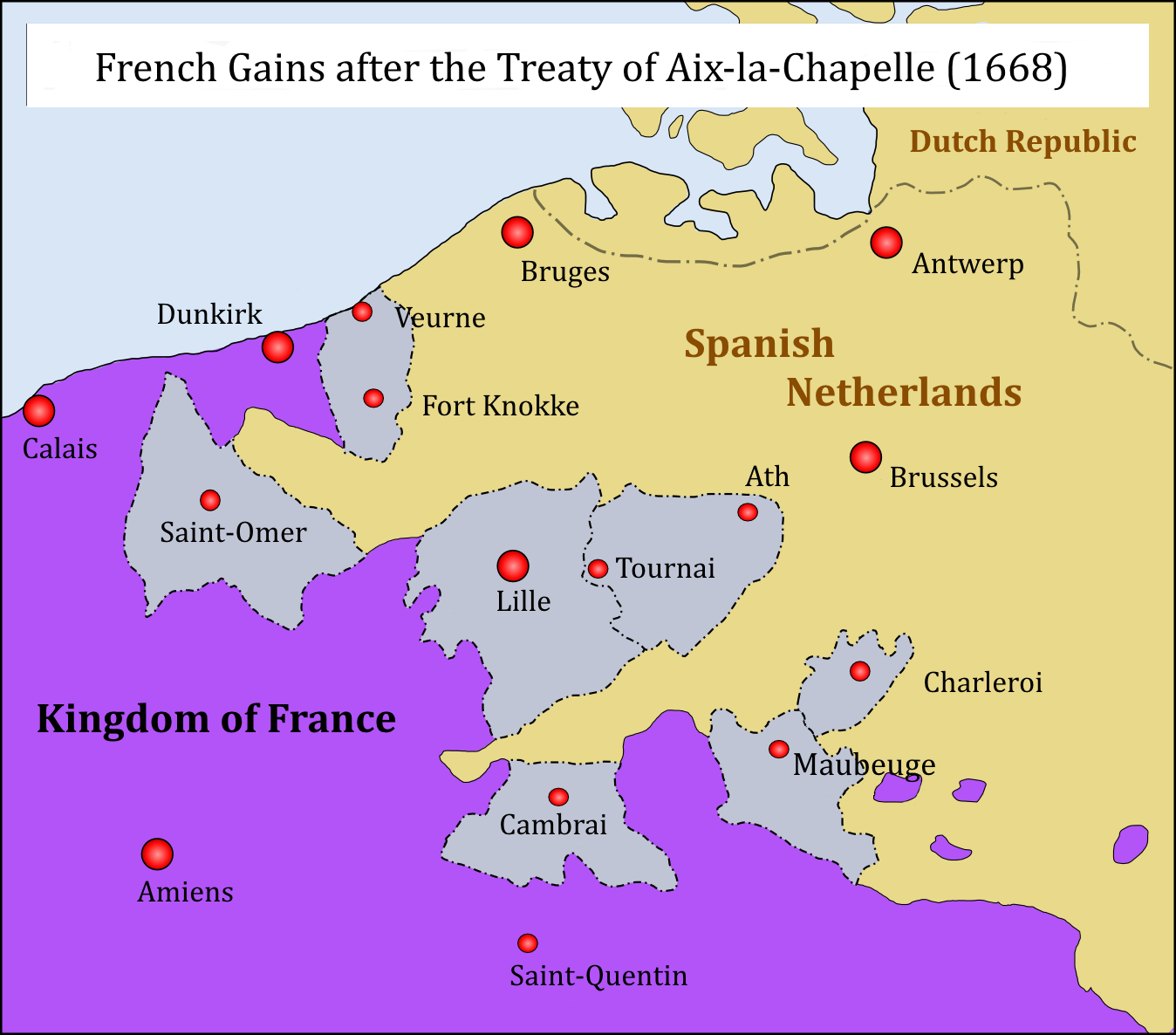
May 2: France gains territory (shown in blue) from the Spanish Netherlands after the Treaty of Aix-la-Chapelle ends the War of Devolution.

1668 (MDCLXVIII) was a leap year starting on Sunday of the Gregorian calendar and a leap year starting on Wednesday of the Julian calendar, the 1668th year of the Common Era (CE) and Anno Domini (AD) designations, the 668th year of the 2nd millennium, the 68th year of the 17th century, and the 9th year of the 1660s decade. As of the start of 1668, the Gregorian calendar was 10 days ahead of the Julian calendar, which remained in localized use until 1923.

== Events ==
=== January–March ===
- January 23 – The Triple Alliance of 1668 is formed between England, Sweden and the United Provinces of the Netherlands.
- February 13 – In Lisbon, a peace treaty is established between Afonso VI of Portugal and Carlos II of Spain, by mediation of Charles II of England, in which the legitimacy of the Portuguese monarch is recognized. Portugal yields Ceuta to Spain.
- c. February – The English Parliament and bishops seek to suppress Thomas Hobbes' treatise Leviathan.
- March 8 – In the Cretan War, the navy of the Republic of Venice defeats an Ottoman Empire naval force of 12 ships and 2,000 galleys that had attempted to seize a small Venetian galley near the port of Agia Pelagia.
- March 22 – Notable Privateer Henry Morgan lands in Cuba to raid and plunder the inland town of Puerto del Príncipe during the latter stages of the Anglo-Spanish War (1654–1660).
- March 23 – The Bawdy House Riots of 1668 take place in London when a group of English Dissenters begins attacking brothels, initially as a protest against the harsh enforcement of laws against private worshippers and the lack of enforcement of laws against prostitution. Over a period of three days, rioters who join in the violence destroy brothels in the London districts of Poplar, Moorfields, East Smithfield, St Leonard's, Shoreditch, St Andrew's and Holborn.
- March 27 – King Charles II of England signs an agreement with representatives of the English East India Company to lease the Indian city of Bombay (modern-day Mumbai) to the company for a rent of 10 pounds sterling per year, with transfer taking effect on September 21.

=== April–June ===
- April 21 – Henry Brouncker is expelled from the English House of Commons for treason during the 1665 Battle of Lowestoft during the Second Anglo-Dutch War.
- April 22 – Tenzin Dalai Khan is proclaimed as the new Protector King of Tibet by the 5th Dalai Lama, following the death of Tenzin's father, Dayan Khan.
- April 24 – The Treaty of Breda, signed in 1667 and ending the Second Anglo-Dutch War, goes into effect worldwide.
- April 25 – The Swedish Empire signs a treaty with England and the Dutch Republic to join the Triple Alliance.
- May 2 – The first Treaty of Aix-la-Chapelle ends the War of Devolution.
- May 18 – Charles Sedley's comedy The Mulberry-Garden premieres at the Theatre Royal in London.
- June 4 – Tangier, a city in Morocco that had come under control of the English colonial empire in 1661, is elevated by the English crown to the status of "free city".
- June 12 – John Dryden's play An Evening's Love, or The Mock Astrologer premieres at the Theatre Royal in London in a performance by the King's Company players for King Charles and Queen Catherine.
- June 16 – A group of Spanish Jesuit missionaries become the first European settlers to arrive at the island of Guam, founding a mission to convert the Chamorro people of the Mariana Islands to Christianity.
- June 18 – Petro Doroshenko is proclaimed by the Russian Empire as the hetman of all of Ukraine, after having previously been granted leadership of the western half. Ivan Briukhovetsky, who had ruled the eastern half and then led an uprising, is executed on the same day.

=== July–September ===
- July 7 – Bishop Isaac Barrow founds the Bishop Barrow Trust with the intention of establishing a university on the Isle of Man; this becomes King William's College.
- July 10 – Henry Morgan's raid on Porto Bello: Welsh privateer Henry Morgan and 450 men under his command plunder the city of Portobello on the Isthmus of Panama and spend 14-days in the attack before withdrawing.
- July 25 – The magnitude 8.5 Shandong earthquake kills at least 43,000 people in China's Shandong province.
- August 17 – The magnitude 8.0 North Anatolia earthquake causes 8,000 deaths in northern Anatolia, Ottoman Empire, and is the most powerful earthquake recorded in Turkey.
- September 9 – Molière's comedy The Miser (L'Avare) is first performed, in Paris.
- September 16 – Jan II Kazimierz Waza abdicates his titles of King of Poland and Grand Duke of Lithuania after a 20-year reign.
- September 21 – The British East India Company takes over Bombay under a Royal Charter of March 27.
- September 28 – Diego de Salcedo is overthrown from his position as the Spanish Governor-General of the Philippines in a coup d'etat led by Juan Manuel de la Peña Bonifaz. Salcedo and other members of his administration are jailed and then sent into exile from Luzon to the island of Panay, and his fortune is confiscated.

=== October –December ===
- October 5 (September 25 O.S.) – The English blockade of the Moroccan port of Salé begins as HMS Garland and HMS Francis retaliate for raids from the port by the Barbary pirates. The blockade lasts for 10 days.
- October 7 – French Jesuit missionary Jean Pierron arrives at the Mohawk Nation city of Tionondogen (near modern-day Palatine, New York, U.S.) to replace Jacques Frémin in attempting to convert members of the Iroquois tribe to Christianity.
- October 31 – The English ship HMS Providence is wrecked at Tangier on the North African coast.
- November 8 – Iliaș Alexandru steps down as the voivode or elected ruler of Moldavia (now part of Romania and the Republic of Moldova) and is replaced by his predecessor, Gheorghe Duca.
- December 6 – The Order of the Jesuati, founded in 1360 by Giovanni Colombini, is abolished by Pope Clement IX.
- December 16 – In China, the 1661 edict of the "Great Clearance", the forcible evacuation of the coastal areas of Guangdong, Fujian, Zhejiang, Jiangnan, and Shandong in order to fight a rebellion, is rescinded by the Kangxi Emperor after lobbying by Zhou Youde, the Viceroy of Liangguang.
- December 28 – Fritz Cronman arrives in Moscow as the Swedish Empire's ambassador to the Russian Empire, accompanied by a staff of 35 people.

=== Date unknown ===
- One of the world's earliest central banks, the Sveriges Riksbank, is founded in Stockholm, Sweden.
- Emperor Yohannes I of Ethiopia convenes a church council in Gondar, which decides to expel all Roman Catholics from the country.
- English scientist Isaac Newton builds the first reflecting telescope (Newton's reflector).

== Births ==
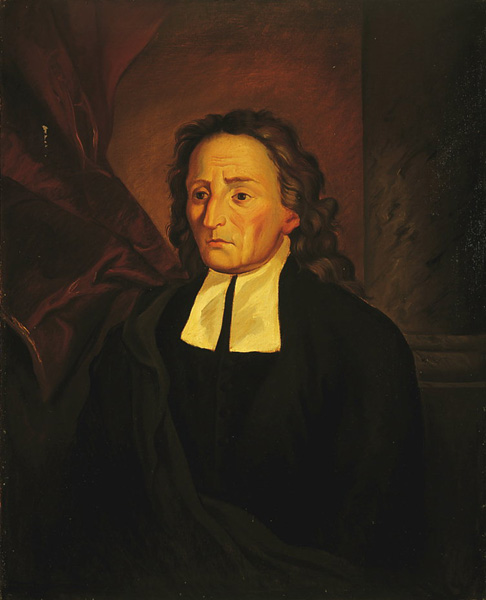
Giambattista Vico

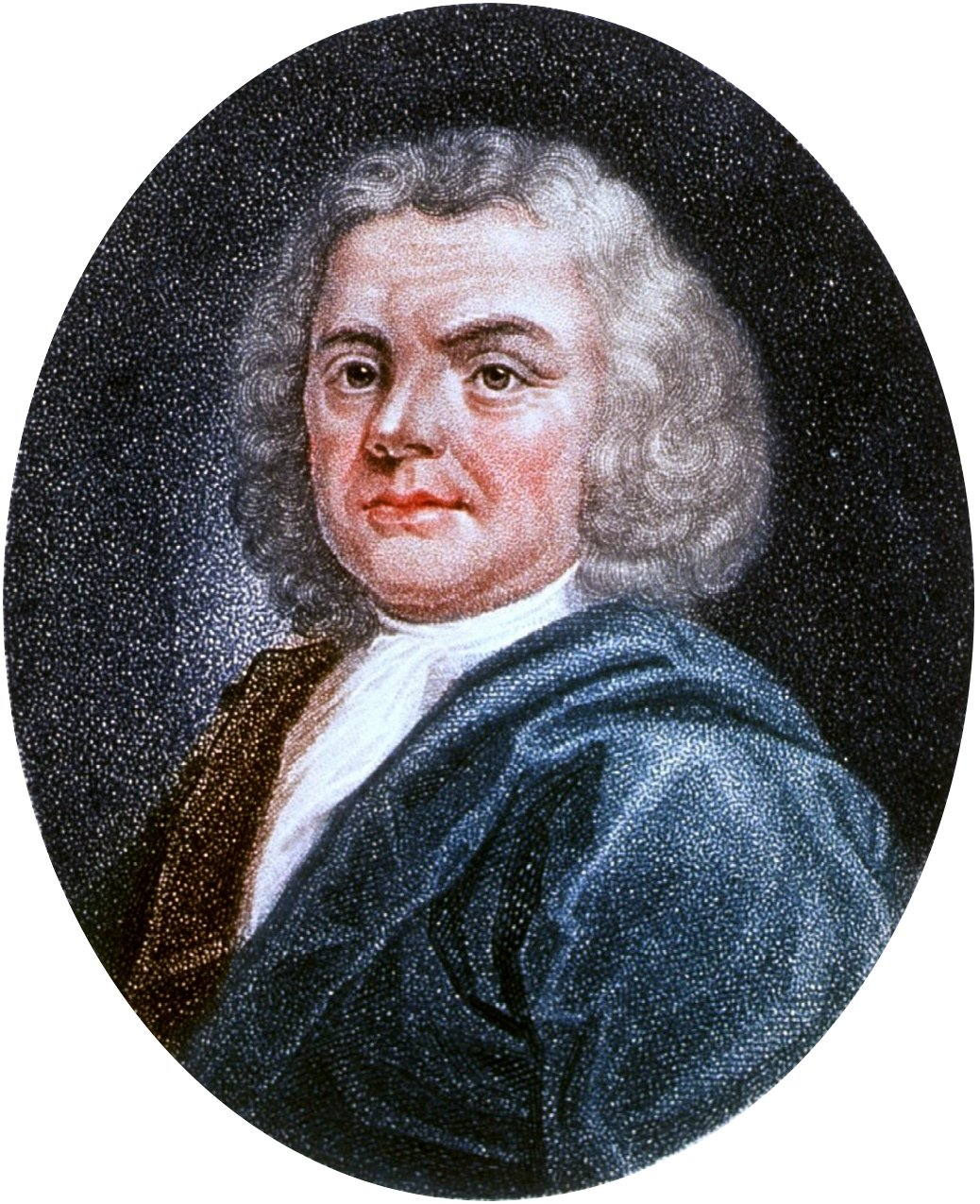
Herman Boerhaave

- May 8 – Alain-René Lesage, French writer (d. 1747)
- June 23 – Giambattista Vico, Italian philosopher and historian (d. 1744)
- July 21 – Frederick Heinrich of Saxe-Zeitz-Pegau-Neustadt (d. 1713)
- September 8 – Giorgio Baglivi, Armenian doctor and writer (d. 1707)
- October 18 – John George IV, Elector of Saxony (d. 1694)
- October 30 – Sophia Charlotte of Hanover, sister of King George I of Great Britain (d. 1705)
- November 10
  - Louis III, Prince of Condé (d. 1710)
  - François Couperin, French composer (d. 1733)
- November 11 – Johann Albert Fabricius, German scholar (d. 1736)
- November 27 – Henri François d'Aguesseau, Chancellor of France (d. 1751)
- November 30 – William August, Duke of Saxe-Eisenach (d. 1671)
- December 11 – Apostolo Zeno, Italian poet and journalist (d. 1750)
- December 31 – Herman Boerhaave, Dutch humanist and physician (d. 1738)
- date unknown – Stokkseyrar-Dísa, Icelandic Galdrmistress (d. 1728)

== Deaths ==
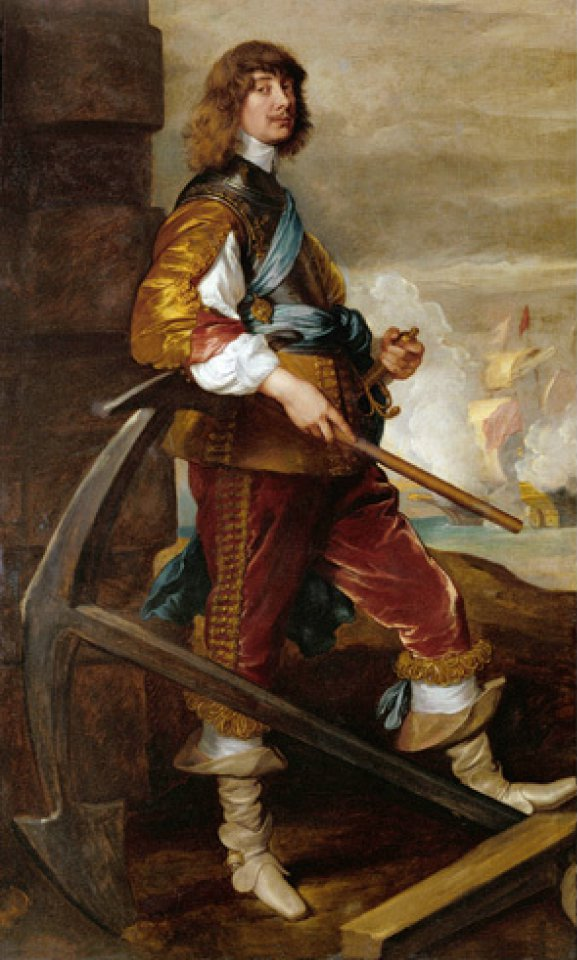
Algernon Percy, 10th Earl of Northumberland

- January 6
  - Luis de Benavides Carrillo, Marquis of Caracena (b. 1608)
  - Magdalene Sibylle of Saxony, Crown Princess of Denmark (b. 1617)
- January 14 – Arnauld de Oihenart, Basque historian and poet (b. 1592)
- January 31 – Hermann Busenbaum, German Jesuit theologian (b. 1600)
- February 2 – Antonio del Castillo y Saavedra, Spanish artist (b. 1616)
- February 8 – Alessandro Tiarini, Italian painter (b. 1577)
- February 21 – John Thurloe, English Puritan spy (b. 1616)
- March 16 – Francis Talbot, 11th Earl of Shrewsbury (b. 1623)
- April 12 – Alexander Daniell, sole proprietor of the Manor of Alverton, Cornwall (b. 1599)
- April 21 – Jan Boeckhorst, Flemish painter (b. c. 1604)
- May 1 – Frans Luycx, Flemish painter (b. 1604)
- May 8 – Catherine of St. Augustine, French nun and nurse of New France (b. 1632)
- May 9 – Otto Christoph von Sparr, German general (b. 1599)
- May 21 – Christoph Delphicus zu Dohna, Prussian-born Swedish soldier, diplomat (b. 1628)
- June 20 – Heinrich Roth, German Sanskrit scholar (b. 1620)
- July 26 – Hans Svane, Danish statesman (b. 1606)
- August 9 – Jakob Balde, German Latinist (b. 1604)
- August 23 – Artus Quellinus the Elder, Flemish sculptor (b. 1609)
- August 24 – Tyman Oosdorp, Dutch brewer and magistrate of Haarlem (b. 1613)
- September 16
  - Paolo Emilio Rondinini, Italian Bishop of Assisi (b. 1617)
  - Jan Miense Molenaer, Dutch painter (b. 1610)
- September 19 – Sir William Waller, English Civil War general (b. c. 1635)
- October 12 – Zacharias Wagenaer, secretary, painter, then merchant and administrator (Dutch East-India Company) (b. 1614)
- October 13
  - Robert Sutton, 1st Baron Lexinton, English politician (b. 1594)
  - Algernon Percy, 10th Earl of Northumberland, English military leader (b. 1602)
- November 17 – Joseph Alleine, English non-conformist preacher (b. 1634)
- November 21 – Adolf William, Duke of Saxe-Eisenach (b. 1632)
- December 3 – William Cecil, 2nd Earl of Salisbury, English earl (b. 1591)
- December 14 – Charles Berkeley, 2nd Viscount Fitzhardinge, English politician (b. 1599)
- December 23 – Martin Bauzer, Gorizian Jesuit priest and writer (b. 1595)
- December 24 – Wadham Wyndham, English judge (b. 1609)
- unknown date – Fang Weiyi, Chinese poet, calligrapher, painter and literature historian (b. 1585)
