= Education in the Isle of Man =

Education in Isle of Man
Department of Education, Sport and Culture
- Minister for Education, Sport and Culture: Julie Edge

National education budget (2017-18)
- Budget: £96.8 million

General details
- Primary languages: English

Enrollment (2017)
- Total: 11,710
- Primary: 6,492
- Secondary: 5,218

Education in the Isle of Man is compulsory for children aged between 5 and 16. As a Crown dependency the Isle of Man parliament and government have competence over all domestic matters, including education; however the structure and curriculum are broadly in line with that of UK schools and particularly the English national curriculum. Education is overseen by the Department of Education, Sport and Culture and regulated by the Isle of Man Education Act 2001. As of September 2017 there were 6,492 pupils in primary schools, and 5,218 pupils in secondary education.

== History ==
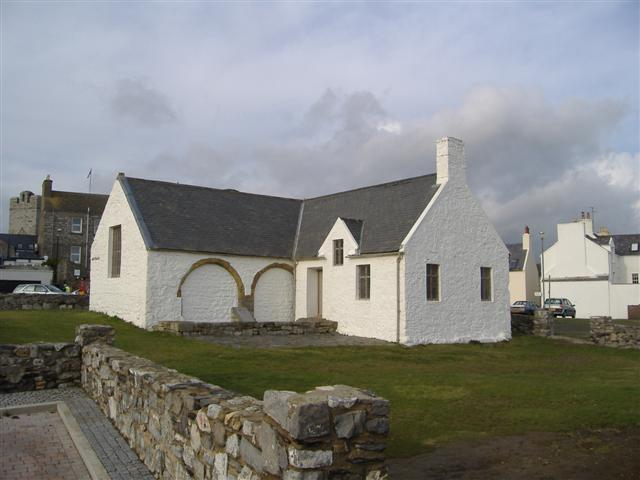
The Old Grammar School, Castletown, used as a school from 1701 until 1930

Before 1675 there were no schools in the Isle of Man and any education was provided by the church. This changed with the arrival of Bishop Isaac Barrow, who established a school in every parish.

Isle of Man schools received grants from the Committee of Council until 1862.

The 1872 Isle of Man Act for Public Elementary Education made schooling compulsory and available to all children on the island, and transferred control of education from the Church to the State.

=== Manx language ===
Jennifer Kewley Draskau formerly taught German at Ramsey Grammar School in Ramsey and introduced Manx Studies to the curriculum.

In 1992, half an hour of Manx language tuition a week was introduced by the Manx Language Unit, headed by Manx Language Officer Brian Stowell, for children aged 7 years and over, with a high uptake from parents. In 1996 a general certificate in Manx was introduced that is equivalent to a GCSE.

The Manx Language Strategy was released in 2017, outlining a five-year plan for the language's continued revitalisation.

== Education system ==
The education system in the Isle of Man is similar to the system used in England. Primary school consists of seven years, and secondary school of seven years. All five secondary schools in the Isle of Man have a sixth form centre.

- Primary education
    - Foundation Stage
      - Reception, age 4 to 5
    - Key Stage 1
      - Year 1, age 5 to 6
      - Year 2, age 6 to 7
    - Key Stage 2
      - Year 3, age 7 to 8
      - Year 4, age 8 to 9
      - Year 5, age 9 to 10
      - Year 6, age 10 to 11
- Secondary education
    - Key Stage 3
      - Year 7, age 11 to 12
      - Year 8, age 12 to 13
      - Year 9, age 13 to 14
    - Key Stage 4
      - Year 10, age 14 to 15
      - Year 11, age 15 to 16 (GCSE examinations)
    - Sixth form
      - Year 12, age 16 to 17 (AS-level examinations)
      - Year 13, age 17 to 18 (A-levels examinations)

=== Schools ===
The Department of Education operates 32 primary schools and 5 secondary schools. Among the primary schools, Bunscoill Ghaelgagh is the only school in the world where children are taught mainly in Manx. Independent schools include King William's College and its junior school, The Buchan School.

=== Further and higher education ===
- Centre for Manx Studies, University of Liverpool, Douglas (until 2015, now located in Liverpool)
- Isle of Man International Business School, Douglas
- University College Isle of Man, Douglas
- Manx Academy of Performing Arts, Douglas
- Manx Professional Educational Services, Douglas

The Isle of Man College of Further and Higher Education rebranded to the University College Isle of Man (UCM) in September 2016.

== See also ==
- Manx Heritage Foundation
- Bishop Barrow Trust
- Manx Telecomputer Bus
