= List of schools in the Isle of Man =

This is a list of schools in the Isle of Man. It includes schools funded by the Isle of Man Department of Education and independent schools.

== Primary schools ==
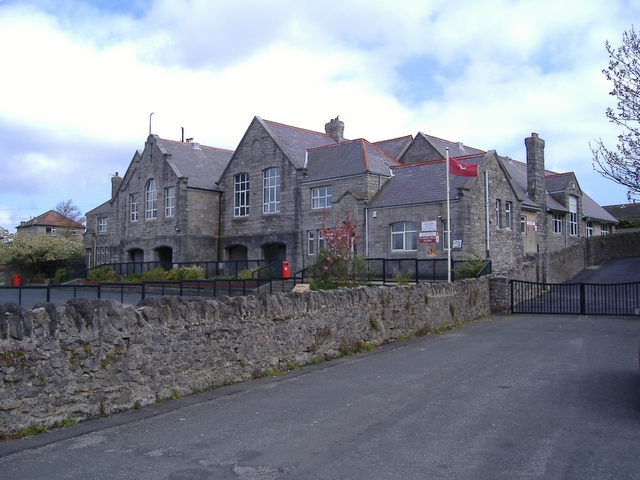
Victoria Road Primary School, Castletown

- Anagh Coar Primary School
- Andreas Primary School
- Arbory Primary School
- Ashley Hill Primary School
- Ballacottier Primary School
- Ballasalla Primary School
- Ballaugh Primary School
- Braddan Primary School
- Bride Infants School
- Bunscoill Ghaelgagh (Manx language)
- Bunscoill Rhumsaa
- Cronk-y-Berry Primary School
- Dhoon Primary School
- Foxdale Primary School
- Henry Bloom Noble Primary School
- Jurby Primary School
- Kewaigue Primary School
- Kirk Michael Primary School
- Laxey Primary School
- Manor Park Primary School
- Marown Primary School
- Onchan Primary School
- Peel Clothworkers Primary School
- Rushen Primary School
- Scoill Phurt Le Moirrey
- Scoill Vallajeelt
- Scoill yn Jubilee
- St. John's Primary School
- St. Mary's Primary School
- Sulby Primary School
- Victoria Road Primary School
- Willaston Primary School

== Secondary schools ==
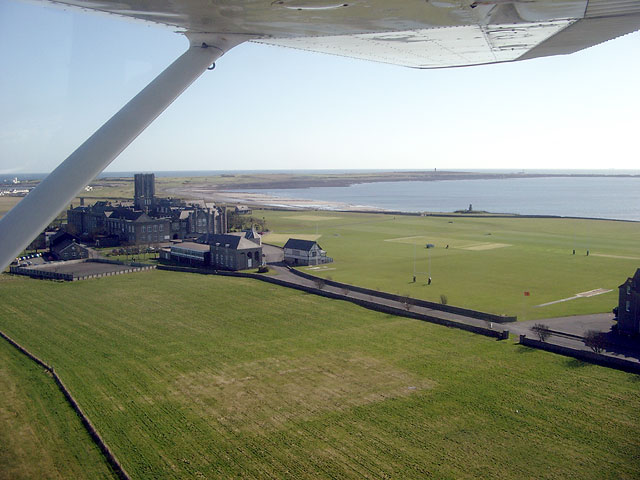
King William's College, Castletown

- Ballakermeen High School, Douglas
- St Ninian's High School, Douglas and Onchan
- Castle Rushen High School, Castletown
- Queen Elizabeth II High School, Peel
- Ramsey Grammar School, Ramsey

== Independent schools ==
- King William's College, Castletown (ages 3–18)
- The Buchan School, Castletown (ages 3–11), independent primary school, junior school for King William's College
- Market Square Preparatory School, Castletown (ages 2–11) Independent Primary School

== See also ==
- University College Isle of Man
- List of universities in the Isle of Man
