= Alan Muir =

Alan Muir may refer to:

- Alan Muir (anatomist) (1925–1974), British anatomist
- Alan Muir (footballer) (1922–1996), Australian rules footballer (Fitzroy)
- Alan Muir (referee) (born 1975), Scottish football referee
