= School inspection =

Inspection of quality of schooling

A school inspection is an official visit undertaken by a regulatory body to assess the quality and safety of the education being provided and the protection of children in a school.

In England, school inspections are undertaken by the Office for Standards in Education, Children's Services and Skills (Ofsted), and in Wales they are undertaken by Estyn, the country's education and training inspectorate. His Majesty's Inspectorate of Education undertakes school inspections in Scotland. Irish schools have an Inspectorate which visits schools in the same way. Isle of Man schools have a two-part quality assurance process which includes school self-assessments and an inspection process based on the provisions of the Education Act 2001.

Independent schools in British Columbia are subject to a provincial inspection process.

Collected reports following a number of school inspections may also be used to develop thematic assessments and recommendations.
