= Kappa =

Tenth letter in the Greek Alphabet

Variant kappa

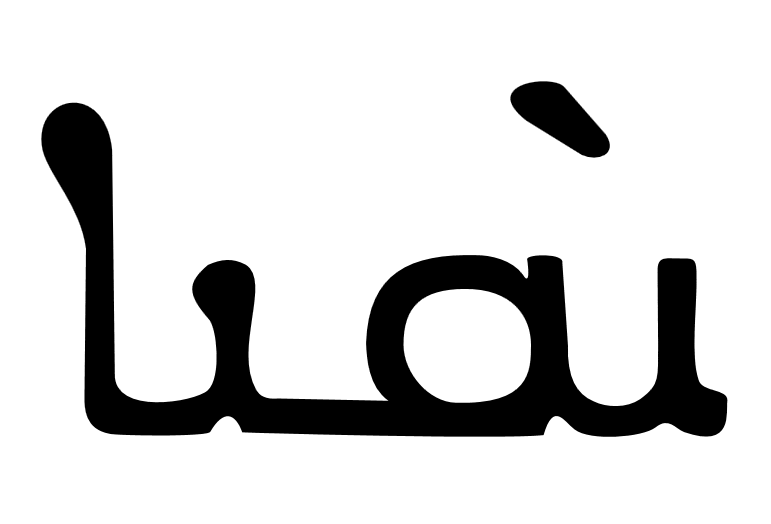
Greek word καί written with a handwritten variant of kappa, from the Byzantine period

Kappa (/ˈkæpə/; uppercase Κ, lowercase κ or cursive ϰ; Greek: κάππα, káppa) is the tenth letter of the Greek alphabet, representing the voiceless velar plosive IPA: [k] sound in Ancient and Modern Greek. In the system of Greek numerals, Kʹ has a value of 20. It was derived from the Phoenician letter kaph (𐤊). Letters that arose from kappa include the Roman K and Cyrillic К. The uppercase form is identical to the Latin K.

Greek proper names and placenames containing kappa are often written in English with "c" due to the Romans' transliterations into the Latin alphabet: Constantinople, Corinth, Crete. All formal modern romanizations of Greek now use the letter "k", however.

The cursive form ϰ is generally a simple font variant of lower-case kappa, but it is encoded separately in Unicode for occasions where it is used as a separate symbol in math and science. In mathematics, the kappa curve is named after this letter; the tangents of this curve were first calculated by Isaac Barrow in the 17th century.

== Symbol ==
=== Lowercase (κ) ===
Mathematics and statistics

- In graph theory, the connectivity of a graph is given by κ.
- In differential geometry, the curvature of a curve is given by κ.
- In linear algebra, the condition number of a matrix is given by κ.
- The kappa curve, also known as Gutschoven's curve, is a curve whose shape resembles the letter κ.
- Kappa statistics such as Cohen's kappa and Fleiss' kappa are methods for calculating inter-rater reliability.

Physics

- In cosmology, the Einstein gravitational constant is denoted by κ.
- In physics, the torsional constant of an oscillator is given by κ.
- In physics, the coupling coefficient in magnetostatics is represented by κ.
- In physics, the dielectric coefficient is represented by κ.
- In fluid dynamics, the von Kármán constant is represented by κ.
- thermal conductivity
- In thermodynamics, the compressibility of a compound is given by κ.

Engineering

- In structural engineering, κ is the ratio of the smaller factored moment to the larger factored moment and is used to calculate the critical elastic moment of an unbraced steel member.
- In electrical engineering, κ is the multiplication factor, a function of the R/X ratio of the equivalent power system network, which is used in calculating the peak short-circuit current of a system fault. κ is also used to denote conductivity, the reciprocal of resistivity, rho.

Biology and biomedical science

- In biology, kappa and kappa prime are important nucleotide motifs for a tertiary interaction of group II introns.
- In biology, kappa designates a subtype of an antibody component.
- In pharmacology, kappa represents a type of opioid receptor.

Psychology and psychiatry

- In psychology and psychiatry, kappa represents a measure of diagnostic reliability.

Economics

- In macroeconomics, kappa represents the capital-utilization rate.

Chemistry

- In chemistry, kappa is used to denote the denticity of the compound.

=== Uppercase (Κ) ===
History

- In textual criticism, the Byzantine text-type (from Κοινη, Koine, the common text).

Mathematics and statistics

- In set theory, kappa is often used to denote an ordinal that is also a cardinal.

Chemistry

- In pulping, the kappa number represents the amount of an oxidizing agent required for bleaching a pulp.

== Unicode ==
- U+039A Κ GREEK CAPITAL LETTER KAPPA (&Kappa;)
- U+03BA κ GREEK SMALL LETTER KAPPA (&kappa;)
- U+03F0 ϰ GREEK KAPPA SYMBOL (&kappav;, &varkappa;)
- U+2C94 Ⲕ COPTIC CAPITAL LETTER KAPA
- U+2C95 ⲕ COPTIC SMALL LETTER KAPA
- U+2CB8 Ⲹ COPTIC CAPITAL LETTER DIALECT-P KAPA
- U+2CB9 ⲹ COPTIC SMALL LETTER DIALECT-P KAPA
- U+1D6B1 𝚱 MATHEMATICAL BOLD CAPITAL KAPPA (Note: The mathematical symbols are only used for math. Stylized Greek text should be encoded using the normal Greek letters, with markup and formatting to indicate text style.)
- U+1D6CB 𝛋 MATHEMATICAL BOLD SMALL KAPPA
- U+1D6DE 𝛞 MATHEMATICAL BOLD KAPPA SYMBOL
- U+1D6EB 𝛫 MATHEMATICAL ITALIC CAPITAL KAPPA
- U+1D705 𝜅 MATHEMATICAL ITALIC SMALL KAPPA
- U+1D718 𝜘 MATHEMATICAL ITALIC KAPPA SYMBOL
- U+1D725 𝜥 MATHEMATICAL BOLD ITALIC CAPITAL KAPPA
- U+1D73F 𝜿 MATHEMATICAL BOLD ITALIC SMALL KAPPA
- U+1D752 𝝒 MATHEMATICAL BOLD ITALIC KAPPA SYMBOL
- U+1D75F 𝝟 MATHEMATICAL SANS-SERIF BOLD CAPITAL KAPPA
- U+1D779 𝝹 MATHEMATICAL SANS-SERIF BOLD SMALL KAPPA
- U+1D78C 𝞌 MATHEMATICAL SANS-SERIF BOLD KAPPA SYMBOL
- U+1D799 𝞙 MATHEMATICAL SANS-SERIF BOLD ITALIC CAPITAL KAPPA
- U+1D7B3 𝞳 MATHEMATICAL SANS-SERIF BOLD ITALIC SMALL KAPPA
- U+1D7C6 𝟆 MATHEMATICAL SANS-SERIF BOLD ITALIC KAPPA SYMBOL
