= Manannan Ballad =

Early Manx poem

The Manannan Ballad or Manx Traditionary Ballad is a poem in Early Manx dating from about the beginning of the 16th century. It gives an account of the history of the Isle of Man and its rulers, ranging from the Gaelic god Manannán mac Lir up to Thomas Stanley, 1st Earl of Derby. The Manannan Ballad is the oldest datable work in the Manx language.

== Synopsis ==
The poem begins with an account of Manannán mac Lir, first ruler of the Isle of Man, who defended the island by magical illusions and by shrouding it in mist. Rushes used to be gathered by the islanders and paid to him in tribute. St Patrick drove out Manannán and his followers, converted Man to Christianity, built keeils throughout the island, and installed St German as its bishop. St German died and was buried in his own church at Peel, but his place was taken by St Maughold, who converted some of St Patrick's keeils into churches and set up the island's parochial system. The poem briefly mentions a succession of bishops before turning to the arrival of King Orry, the first King of Man. Under him and his descendants Man gained its courts, assembly and taxes. The men of Orry's line were extirpated by Alexander, son of the Scottish king, but, the poet laments, he did not remain in the island. One woman, a king's daughter, fled to the king of England's court and begged for his protection. He married her to Sir William Montague, who thus became king of Man, but he sold the island to Lord Scrope. On Lord Scrope's death it passed to the king of England, who gave it first to the Earl of Northumberland and then, in reward for his services in battle, to Sir John Stanley. The island passed to Sir John's son, also called Sir John Stanley, then to Thomas Derby, who ravaged the Scottish town of Kirkcudbright, pacified the Isle of Man and ruled in magnificence. Derby is still alive, and the poet forebears to praise him in case he should be thought a flatterer. Later additions to the poem record that the island has come under the rule of a Scottish duke, James Murray, and then of the English king, who has destroyed the island's trade.

== Verse form ==
The ballad was written in quatrains, with rhyme scheme ABAB. The lines have eight syllables, or occasionally nine, in iambic metre. The poem uses neither alliteration nor internal rhyme.

== Composition ==
Internal evidence shows the poem to have been written between about 1490 and 1520, perhaps by an inhabitant of the east-central part of the Isle of Man. It was written in an antiquarian spirit, drawing on documents and oral traditions for its picture of Manx history. Two short additions to the poem were written in the 18th century to bring the story up to date.

== Transmission ==
The ballad was at first transmitted orally, but around the year 1770 it was transcribed in two independent manuscripts, perhaps as a result of the general enthusiasm for collecting traditional ballads sparked by the controversy surrounding James Macpherson's Ossian poems. A 1778 printing of the poem, cited in Charles Vallancey's Collectanea de rebus Hibernicis IV (1786), is now lost, but an 1802 pamphlet giving its text survives in two copies. The ballad's appearance in Joseph Train's Historical and Statistical Account of the Isle of Man (1845) ensured its survival, though it was given little attention by later 19th-century Manx historians, some of whom doubted its authenticity. Theophilus Talbot, for example, argued that it had been written by Thomas Christian in the 1790s.

== Editions and translations ==
- Train, Joseph (1845). An Historical and Statistical Account of the Isle of Man, from the Earliest Times to the Present Date. Volume 1. Douglas, Isle of Man: Mary A. Quiggin. pp. 50–55. The 1802 text with a facing English translation
- Thomson, R. L. (1961). "The Manx Traditionary Ballad". Études Celtiques. 9 (2): 521–548. doi:10.3406/ecelt.1961.1480. Edition, translation and commentary covering stanzas 1–28
- Thomson, R. L. (1962). "The Manx Traditionary Ballad (suite et fin)". Études Celtiques. 10 (1): 60–87. doi:10.3406/ecelt.1962.1354. Edition, translation and commentary covering stanzas 29–62
- Draskau, Jennifer Kewley (2006). "An Account of the Isle of Man in Song". Centre for Manx Studies, University of Liverpool.

== Sources ==
- Broderick, George (2008). "Manx Gaelic (Manx Gälisch)". In Ammon, Ulrich; Haarmann, Harald (eds.). Wieser Enzyklopädie: Sprachen des europäischen Westens. Band 2. Klagenfurt: Wieser. pp. 195–225. ISBN 9783851297966.
