= List of universities in the Isle of Man =

This is a list of universities in the Isle of Man, a British Crown dependency.

== Institutes of Higher Education ==
- University College Isle of Man (an associate college of the University of Chester)

== Centres of Higher Education ==
- Centre for Manx Studies (part of the School of Archaeology, Classics and Egyptology in the University of Liverpool)

== See also ==
- Isle of Man College
- List of schools in the Isle of Man
