= William de Lode =

William de Lode (died 12 May 1403), also known as William Gilbert, was the Prior of Spinney Abbey in Cambridgeshire from 1390 to 1403. He is recorded as having been fatally stabbed at his place of worship.

== Origins ==
Little is known of William's origins. His secular name was William Gilbert, and before becoming Prior at Spinney he was a canon at nearby Anglesey Abbey, which is near the village of Lode. It seems likely that William was born in the village whose name he subsequently took.

== Death ==
William's murder, which occurred on a Sunday, was committed by three of his own canons, William Hall, John Lode and Thomas Smyth, who stabbed him in the priory church. The reason for the attack, if offered, has been lost to history, and although the three canons were found guilty at Cambridge Castle on 20 July 1403, their subsequent fate was also unrecorded.
