= Samuel Rutter =

- Bishop of Sodor and Man
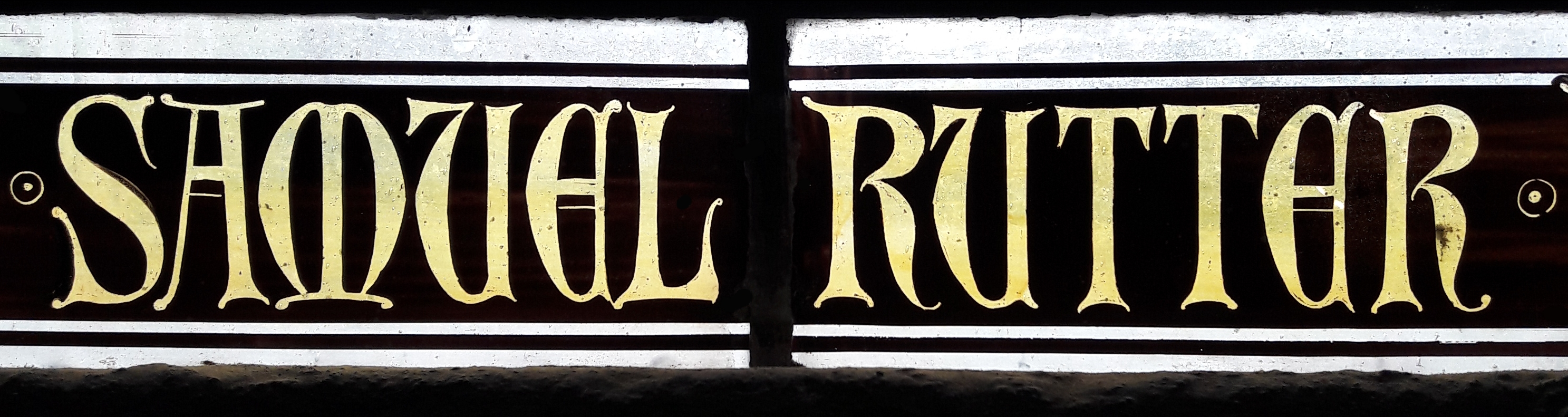
- Samuel Rutter's name in stained glass
- Installed: 14 March 1661
- Term ended: 1663 (death)
- Predecessor: Richard Parr
- Successor: Isaac Barrow
- Other post: Archdeacon of Man

Orders
- Consecration: 24 March 1661 by John Cosin

Personal details
- Died: 30 May 1663 Isle of Man
- Buried: St German's Cathedral, Isle of Man
- Education: Westminster School; Christ Church, Oxford

Samuel Rutter was Bishop of Sodor and Man between 1661 and 1662 (or 1663).

It is suggested in the Mona Miscellaney that Sam Rutter was probably a native of Lancashire, educated at Westminster school, and elected from there in 1623, to Christ Church, Oxford. He was nominated as Archdeacon of Man in 1640. He was appointed Prebendary of Longden, in the cathedral of Lichfield (being M.A.) 24 November 1660.

Upon the Restoration, he was made Bishop of Sodor and Man: he was presented to the See by Charles Stanley, 8th Earl of Derby on 18 December 1660, confirmed 14 March, and consecrated a bishop on 24 March 1661. (the last day of the Restoration year).

He was a chaplain to the James Stanley, 7th Earl of Derby, and was at Lathom House during its first siege. He was also "the chosen friend counsellor, and afterwards chaplain, of the noble-minded Countess, during all her troubles, and it was principally through her influence that he succeeded to the bishopric."

He is reported as having been "grave and devout, temperate and dignified, and unfortunately was worn out, though not an old man, when he became a bishop, and died in the Isle of Man" on 30 May 1663. (see Stanley Papers, part iii. vol. i. pp. cxxx.-ii., note; Chetham Society)

His body was interred in the chancel of the old Peel St German's Cathedral in Peel Castle and there one can find an inscription, that he is alleged to have written himself. A translation of it reads as follows:

In this house which I have borrowed from my brothers the worms
in the hope of the resurrection to life
lie I SAM by divine grace Bishop of this Island.
Stay reader, behold and laugh at the Bishop's palace.

He wrote numerous pieces of poetry for the Earl of Derby's amusement, but not many of them have been published.

== See also ==
A detailed biography of Rutter has been written by A.W. Moore. This can be found in the Manx Note Book vol ii no.8 p159. Rutter's Ballads may be found in Mona Miscellany.
