= Peel Castle =

Ancient castle on Isle of Man

Coordinates: 54°13′35″N 4°41′57″W

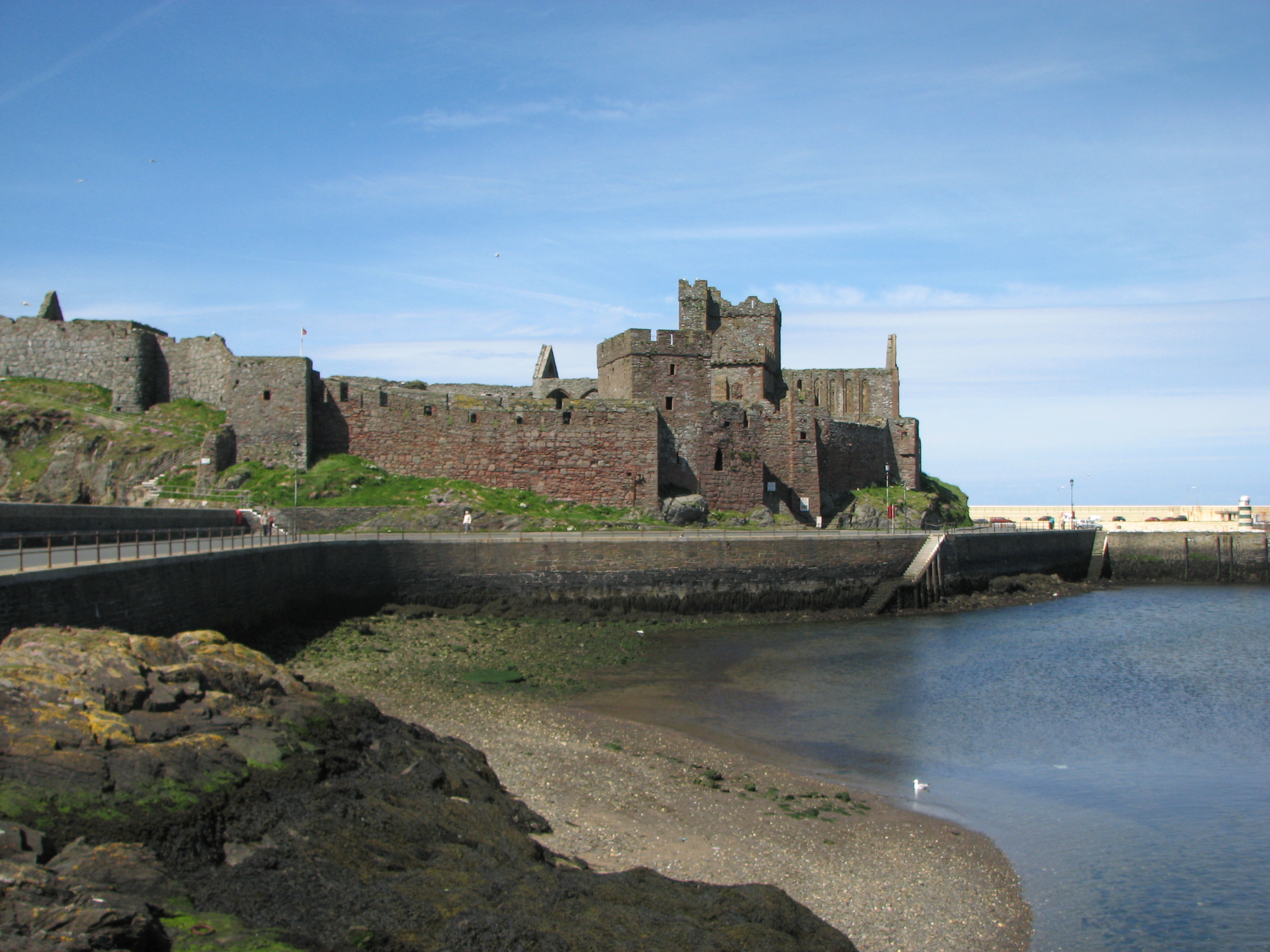
- Peel Castle as seen from the swing bridge at the entrance to Peel harbour
- Interactive map of the Peel Castle area

General information
- Location: St Patrick's Isle, Peel, Isle of Man
- Construction started: 11th century
- Completed: 1860
- Client: Magnus II of the Isle of Man

Design and construction
- Architect: Several

Peel Castle (Cashtal Phurt ny h-Inshey in Manx Gaelic) is a castle in Peel in the Isle of Man, originally constructed by Norwegians. The castle stands on St Patrick's Isle, which is connected to the town by a causeway. It is now owned by Manx National Heritage and is open to visitors during the summer.

The castle was built in the 11th century by Norwegians, under the rule of King Magnus Barefoot. While there were older stone Celtic monastic buildings on the island, the first Norwegian fortifications were built of wood. The prominent round tower was originally part of the Celtic monastery, but had battlements added at a later date. In the early 14th century, the majority of the walls and towers were built primarily from local red sandstone, which is found abundantly in the area. After the rule of Norway, the castle continued to be used by the Church due to the cathedral built there – the see of the diocese of Sodor and Man – but was eventually abandoned in the 18th century.

The castle remained fortified, and new defensive positions were added as late as 1860. The buildings within the castle are now mostly ruined, but the outer walls remain intact. Excavations in 1982–87 revealed an extensive graveyard as well as the remains of Magnus Barefoot's original wooden fort. The most spectacular finds were the 10th century grave of "The Pagan Lady" which included a fine example of a Norwegian necklace and a cache of silver coins dating from about 1030. The castle's most famous "resident" is the so-called Moddey Dhoo or "Black Dog" ghost.

Peel Castle features today on the reverse side of the £10 banknotes issued by the Isle of Man Government.

Peel Castle may occasionally be confused with Piel Castle, located on Piel Island, to the east across the Irish Sea. This particularly occurs in reference to the William Wordsworth poem describing Piel, spelling its name as 'Peele': especially as Wordsworth is documented as having visited Peel Castle, and wrote several times about the Isle of Man.

Peel Castle has been proposed as a possible location of the Arthurian Avalon.

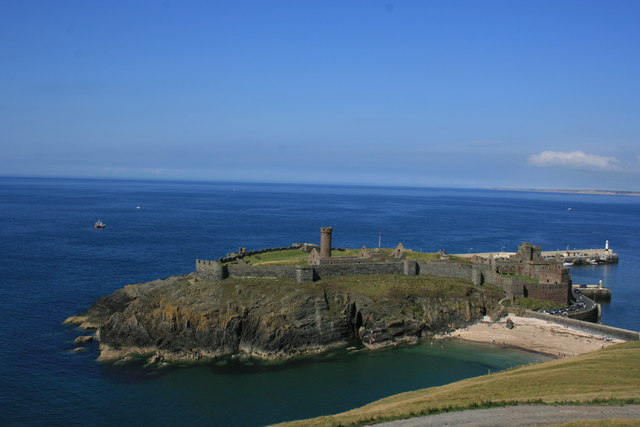
St. Patrick's Isle from Peel Hill

== Cathedral of St German (ruins) ==
The cathedral ruins located within the walls of Peel Castle are those of the former Cathedral of St German. Like the structures throughout the castle grounds, the cathedral's roof is completely missing. Robert Anderson examined the ruins to determine what repairs were required to restore the cathedral, and he reported to the island's Lieutenant Governor in 1877. However, none of the suggested repairs were carried out.

There is a pointed barrel-vaulted crypt below the chancel, measuring 34 feet by 16 feet by 9 feet high at the west end (10 × 5 × 3 metres), sloping to the entrance at the east.

In the middle of the transept is the tomb where Bishop Rutter was interred in 1661.

There is a cemetery in what was once the cathedral's nave.

In 1980, the parish of German, part of the Church of England's Diocese of Sodor and Man, was officially transferred to the newer Cathedral Church of St German on Albany Road in Peel.

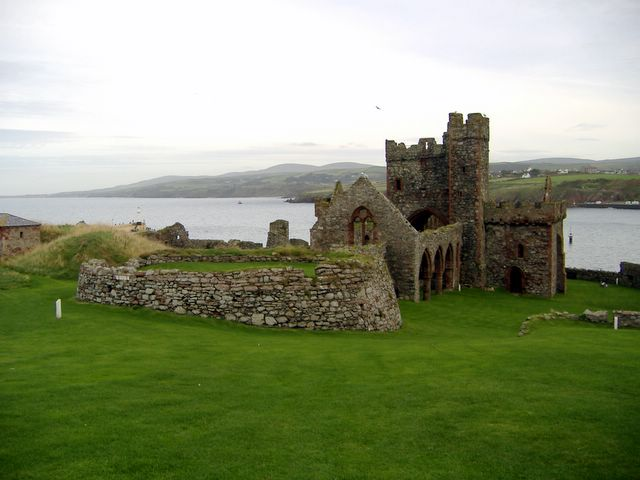
The cathedral, inside the castle

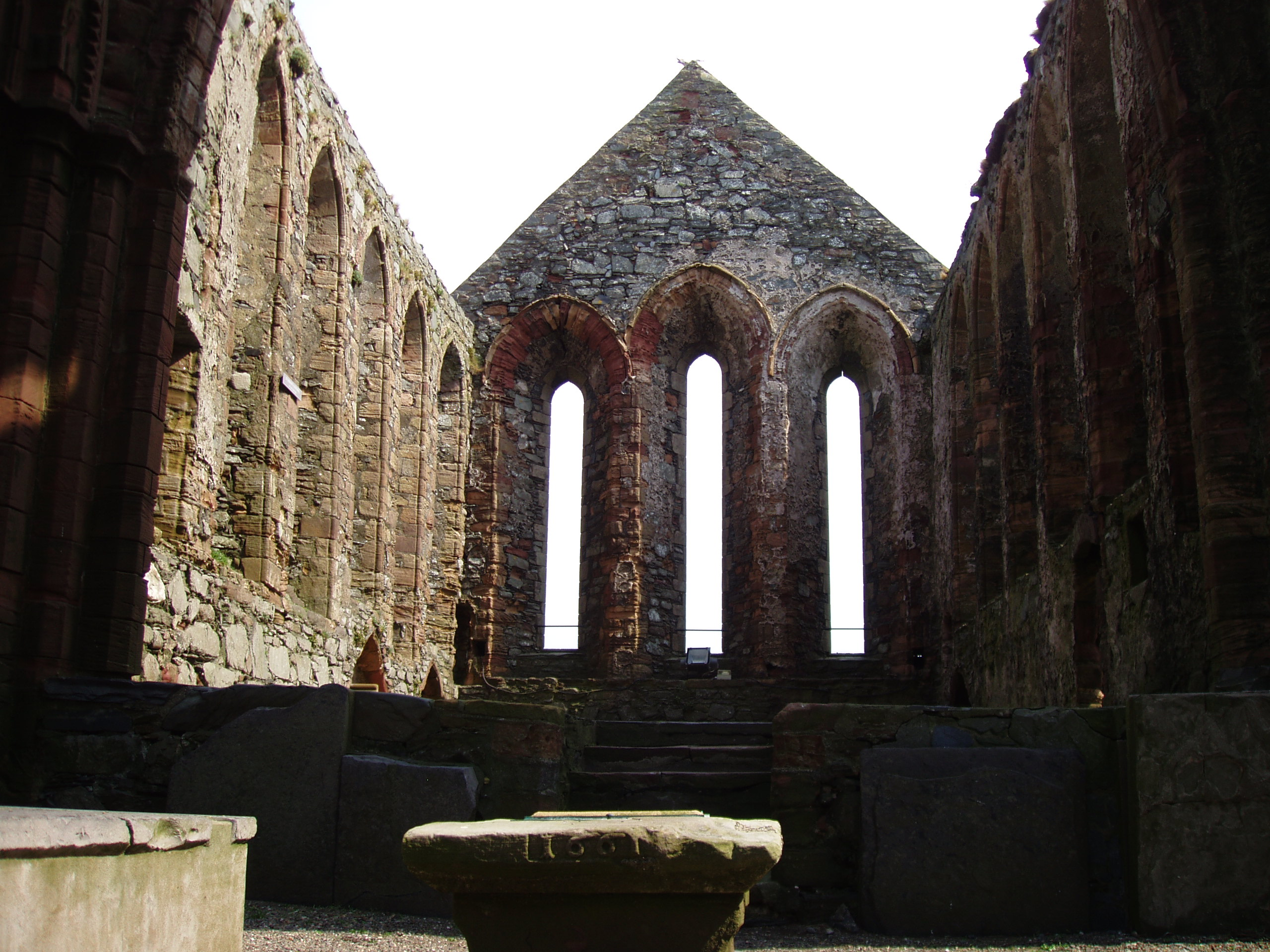
Chancel of the Cathedral of St. German

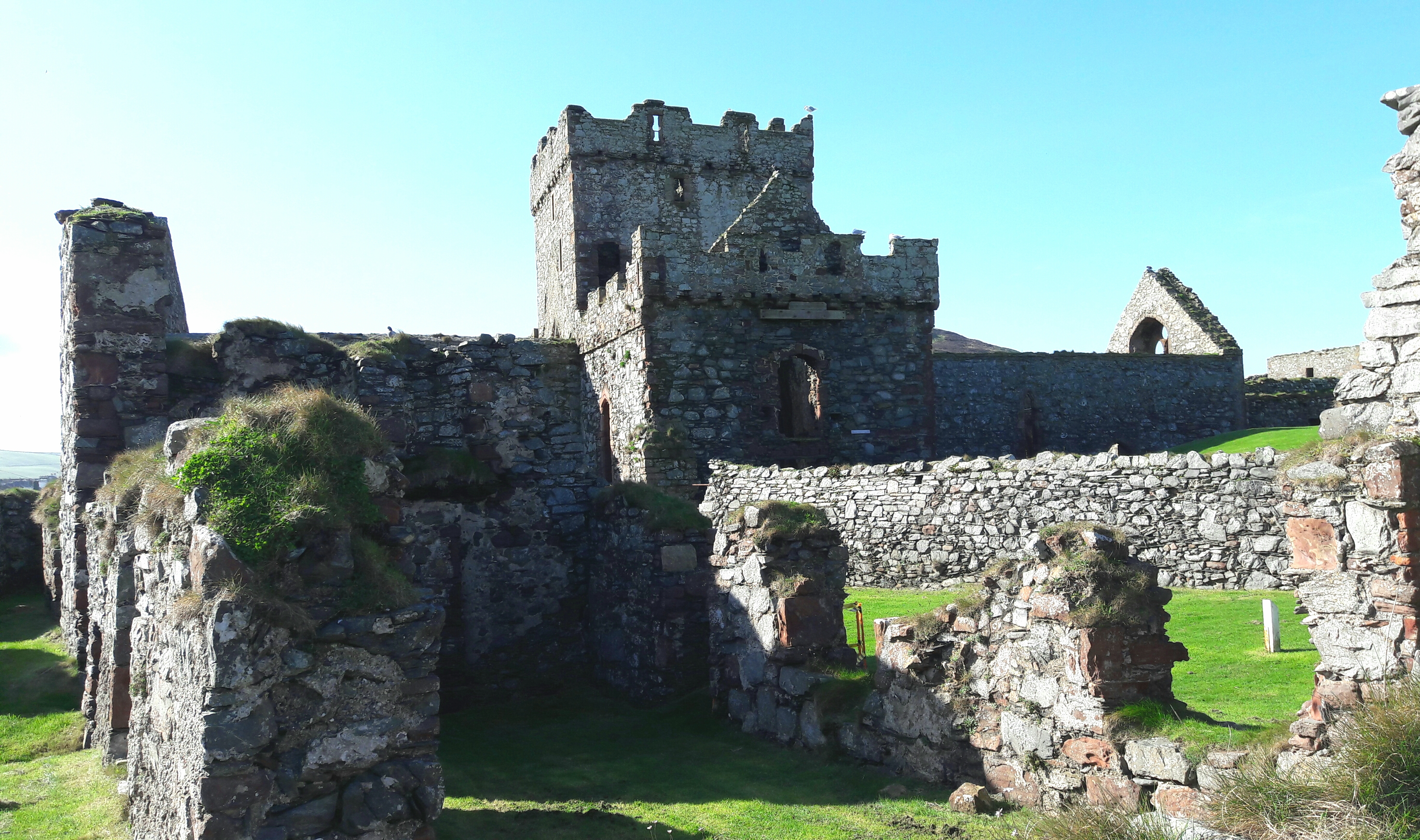
The Cathedral behind the late 15th century Lord's Apartments

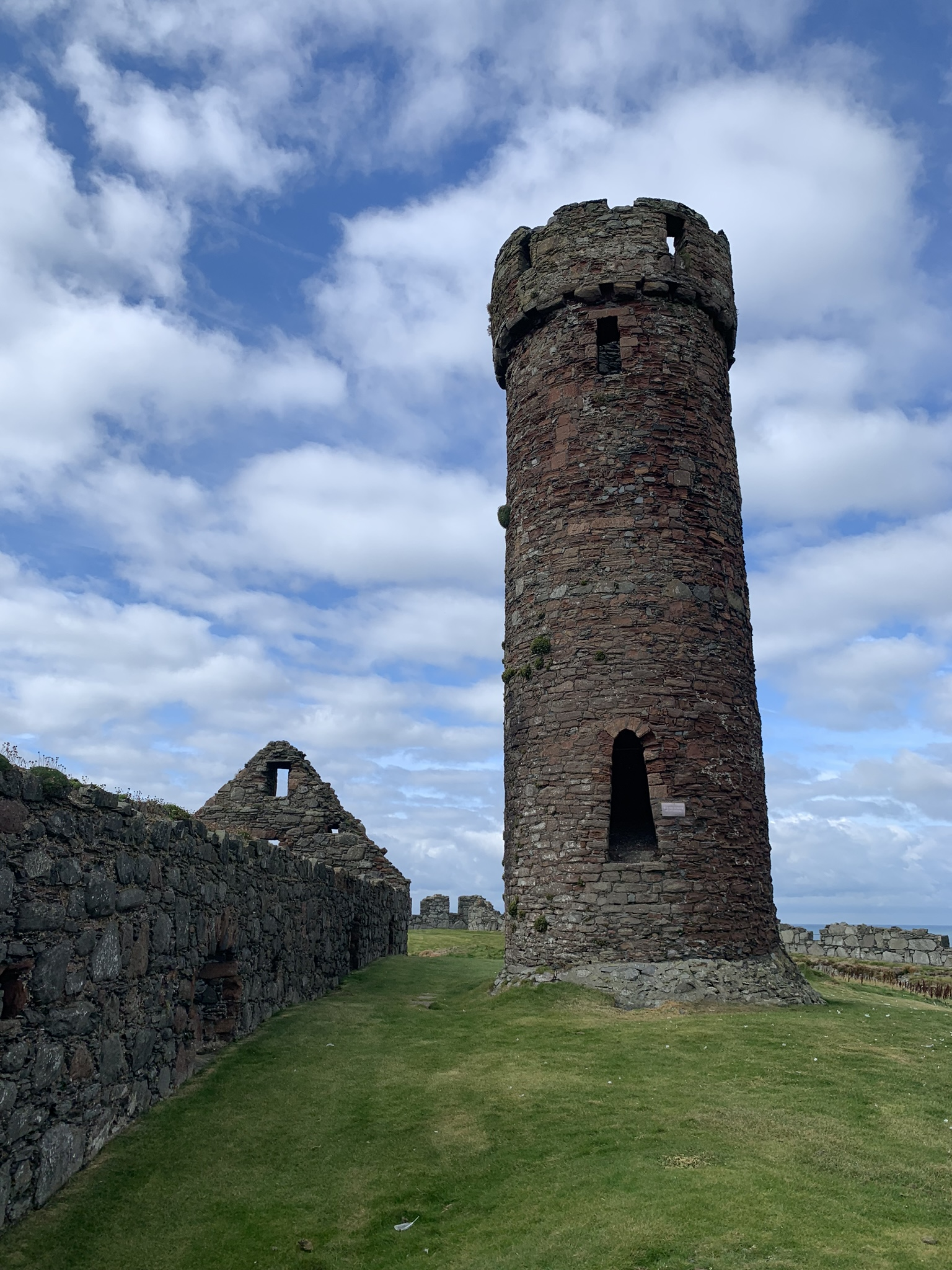
The round tower, in the ruins of Peel Castle

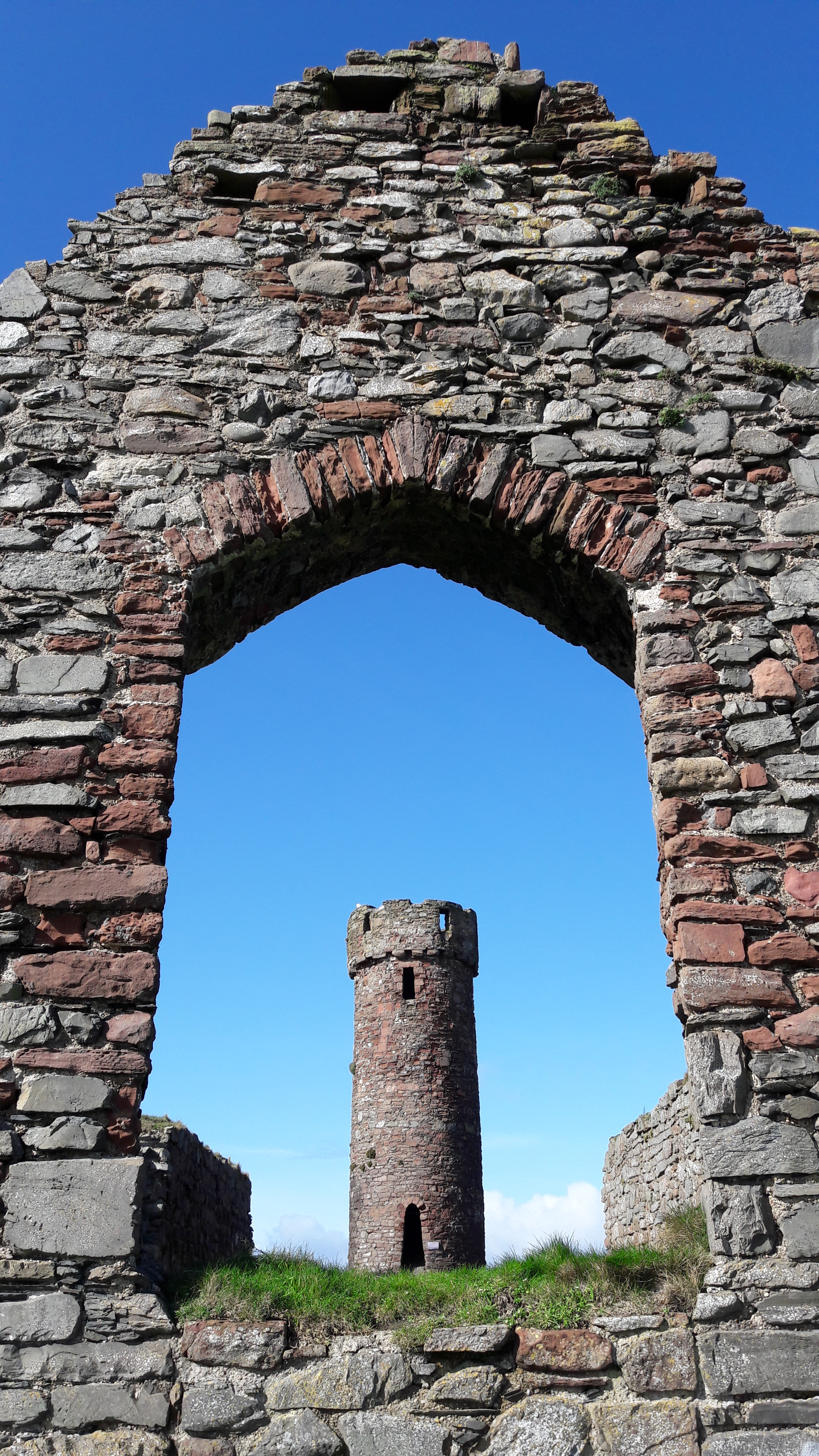
The 10th or 11th century round tower viewed through the window of St. Patrick's Church
