= Alan Muir (footballer) =

Australian rules footballer

Personal information
- Full name: Alan Murray Muir
- Born: 2 January 1922; Fitzroy, Victoria
- Died: 20 September 1996 (aged 74)
- Original team: Ivanhoe Amateurs
- Height: 175 cm (5 ft 9 in)
- Weight: 71 kg (157 lb)

Playing career^{1}
Years	Club	Games (Goals)
1940–1942	Fitzroy	6 (0)
- ^{1} Playing statistics correct to the end of 1942.

Alan Murray Muir (2 January 1922 – 20 September 1996) was an Australian rules footballer who played for the Fitzroy Football Club in the Victorian Football League (VFL).

Muir later served in the Australian Army during the latter part of World War II.
