= Alan Muir (anatomist) =

British anatomist

Alan Ramsey Muir FRSE (1925 – 14 February 1974) was a 20th-century British anatomist. He was one of the first lecturers to instruct in the use of the electron microscope.

== Life ==
He was born in 1925 at Ramsey on the Isle of Man. He was educated at St John Deans's Grammar School in Northwich then King William's College in the Isle of Man.

He studied medicine at the University of Edinburgh graduating with an MB ChB in 1947. After 18 months as House Surgeon at Northampton Infirmary he then served 18 months National Service in the Royal Army Medical Corps at the rank of captain. He began lecturing in anatomy at the University of Edinburgh in 1950, gaining his MD in 1952. In 1955 he took a travelling scholarship to St Louis in the United States, studying under Professor E. W. Dempsey.

In 1958 he became a Senior Lecturer and Reader in 1962. He gained his professorship in 1966 transferring to the Dick Vet School in the south of Edinburgh. In 1966 he also did a lecturing tour in South Africa.

In 1968 he was elected a Fellow of the Royal Society of Edinburgh. His proposers were George Romanes, Richard H. A. Swain, George Montgomery and Arthur Lancelot Craig-Bennett.

He died after a short illness on 14 February 1974 aged 49.

== Family ==
He was married with three children.
