= Spinney Abbey =

Former monastery in Cambridgeshire

Coordinates: 52.3218°N 0.2802°E

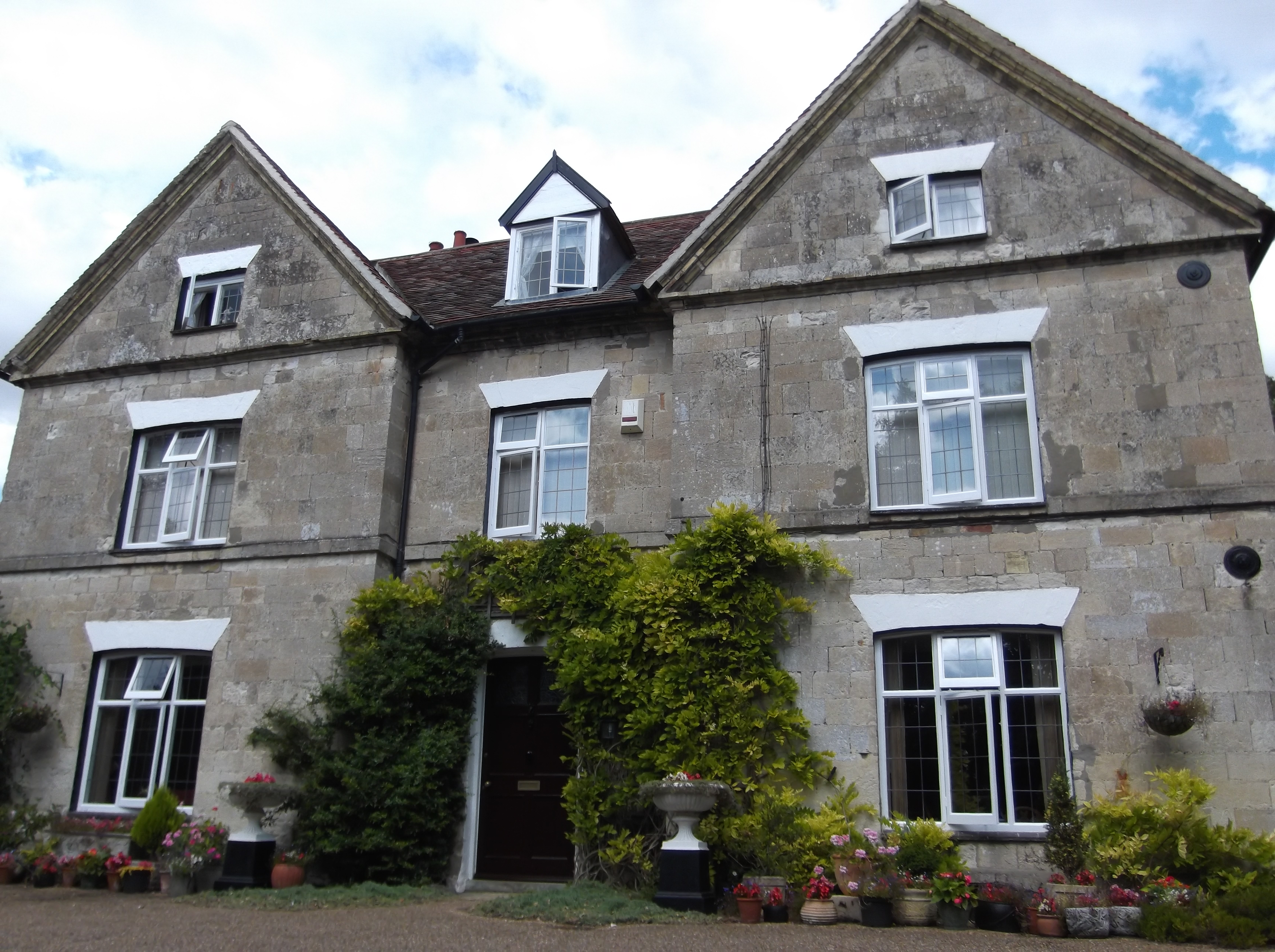
The new house at Spinney Abbey, built in 1775

Spinney Abbey, originally known as Spinney Priory, is a house and farm on the site of a former monastic foundation close to the village of Wicken, on the edge of the fens in Cambridgeshire, England.

== Monastic origins ==
Between 1216 and 1228, Beatrice, the granddaughter of Wimar, Steward of the Count of Brittany, founded the Priory of St Mary and the Holy Cross in the spinney a mile (1.6 km) from Wicken. The priory accommodated three canons of the Augustinian order. It was endowed with the advowson of the parish church, 55 acres (223,000 m^{2}) of land, a marsh called Frithfen and the fishery of Gormere. Frithfen is likely to have included at least part of the area now known as Wicken Fen National Nature Reserve, although its exact location is unclear. As such this is the earliest record concerning that area, as well as Spinney Priory. For centuries the monastery was associated with the fen, and this continues even now with water being pumped from the farm fields into the Nature Reserve.

In 1301 Mary de Bassingbourne expanded the establishment with 90 acres (364,000 m^{2}) more and four more canons. The bad news was that her endowment depended upon the canons feeding 3000 poor people per year – a task which they soon enough complained was 'grievous and insupportable'.

In 1403 the Prior, William de Lode, was murdered by three of his own canons who stabbed him in the priory church. What happened to the murderers is unrecorded. This grisly tale has given rise to many ghost stories about the Abbey.

== Decline and dissolution of the Priory ==
Fortunes at Spinney declined with the Black Death and the social upheavals of the 14th century, and in 1449 Spinney Priory was absorbed into the cathedral priory of Ely, which in due course became Ely Cathedral, once the monastery had been suppressed. From the time of its union with Ely, Spinney Priory ceased to be an Augustinian monastery, and became Benedictine.

The priory continued in existence and the almshouses it supported were not immediately abolished. In 1536 Henry VIII began the Dissolution of the Monasteries and Spinney Priory was dissolved.

== History since the Dissolution ==
Spinney became a private property and was owned by various persons, including Sir Edward Peyton who had been a prominent leader of the puritan party during the reign of Charles I.

=== Isaac Barrow ===
As a child in 1634, Isaac Barrow, the theologian and mathematician, lived for two years at Spinney Priory, now becoming locally called 'Abbey' which was at that time owned by his grandfather, also named Isaac Barrow.

=== Henry Cromwell ===
Perhaps the most celebrated former owner of Spinney Abbey, and one who actually dwelt there, is Henry Cromwell, the fourth son of Oliver Cromwell. Henry lived in Spinney Abbey after his retirement from his office as Lord Deputy of Ireland at the Restoration. He was a well-respected and capable man, and having petitioned the King was allowed to continue living in peace there despite his father's fate. He owned Spinney from 1659 to his death in 1673, and tradition has it that King Charles II visited him there in September 1671. Henry Cromwell is buried with his wife at Wicken parish church.

=== The New House ===
The new house – the current building – was built in 1775. The cellar of the original priory still survives below and in it the great stones of the mediaeval masons are seen, along with some iron fittings which have perhaps inevitably gained the reputation of being the remains of mediaeval prisoners' restraints – although there is no evidence to support such a tale. Other older parts are incorporated into the building – some of the old priory doors, for example.

The farm had problems with flooding, and until the installation of the diesel pumps which still drain it today, this has always been a difficulty. A number of tenants came and went with little success. By 1883 the owner and occupier was Robert Chambers Golding, known as 'Old Golding'. He built the large barn known as Old Golding's Barn, which is still in use. It bears his initials 'RG'.

His son, Chambers Waddelow Golding, known as 'Young Golding', was an eccentric who drank himself to an early death. He once took a horse upstairs, and the imprint of a hoof can be discerned upon the stairs still.

=== The Fuller family ===
Since at least 1695 in adjacent Padney, the Fuller family had been farming alongside Spinney Abbey. In 1892 Thomas Fuller brought his family to farm at Spinney Abbey, and by 1918 the freehold was in the family, and has remained there with various changes to the farm boundaries. In 1900 the farm was a mixed, mainly arable farm. As of 2026 it is still a working farm now farming traditional slow-growing breeds, English Longhorn cattle and Gloucester Old Spots pigs.

In 2012 Spinney Abbey Farm launched their first cider: "Monk & Disorderly" which won champion cider at Norwich Beer Festival 2013, 2015, 2016 & 2018 and St Ives 2014 & 2016. New ciders followed: "Virgin on the Ridiculous", "Fruity Friar", "Dirty Habit", "Rhubarb", "Prior Warning", "Swinging Sisters". and most recently "Blushing Nun".

== Local folklore & legends ==
Local tales tell how monks can still be heard chanting at night, and that their ghosts have been seen.

The bank at the southern edge of the farm is called Spinney Bank, and is a location notorious for sightings of the mythical 'Old Shuck'.

== Other associations ==
Spinney Abbey is the name of the setting for the 1984 detective novel The Jerusalem Inn by Martha Grimes in her 'Inspector Jury' series.
