= HMS Francis (1666) =

British warship

History

England
- Name: HMS Francis
- Builder: Royal Dockyard, Harwich
- Launched: 1666
- Commissioned: 19 July 1666
- Fate: Wrecked in West Indies on 1 August 1684

General characteristics
- Class & type: 16/14=gun, Sixth Rate
- Tons burthen: 140 40/94 bm
- Length: 66 ft 0 in (20.12 m) keel for tonnage
- Beam: 20 ft 0 in (6.10 m) for tonnage
- Draught: 8 ft 8 in (2.64 m)
- Depth of hold: 9 ft 2 in (2.79 m)
- Armament: as built; 16 × 6-pounder MLSB guns; 1677; 14 × minions on trucks; 2 × 3-pdrs

HMS Francis was built by Anthony Deane during his tenure as the Master Shipwright at Harwich Dockyard under the 1665 Programme. She was commissioned in July 1666, she was Allin's squadron in the Mediterranean and participated in the blockade of Salé (a North African port for the Barbary pirates) in October 1668, she was guardship at Sheerness between 1671 and 1674 and had service in the Channel. She was sent to the Leeward Islands in 1683 where she was lost in a hurricane in August 1684.

Francis was the fifth named vessel since its introduction for a discovery vessel in 1578 and wrecked in 1583.

== Design and specifications ==
Her construction dates little is known other than Her launch date. She was launched at Harwich Dockyard in 1666 (probably in late July or early August). Her keel length reported for tonnage was 66 feet 0 inches (20.12 metres). Her breadth was 20 feet 0 inches (6.10 metres) as reported for tonnage with her depth of hold of 9 feet 2 inches (2.79 metres). Her draught was only 8 feet 8 inches (2.64 metres). Her tonnage was calculated as 140 40/94 tons.

Her initial armament was listed as fourteen to sixteen 6-pounder muzzle-loading smoothbore guns mounted on trucks. By 1671 this was changed to fourteen minions and two 3-pounder smoothbore guns. A minion cannon was a muzzle-loading smoothbore 1,000-pound gun with a 3 1/2-inch bore firing a 4-inch shot with a 4-pound powder charge. The guns were also mounted on wooden trucks.

== Commissioned service ==
She was commissioned on 19 July 1666 under Captain William Burstow, RN for service in the Mediterranean. She was with Allin's squadron at the blockade of Salé with HMS Garland from 25 September to 5 October 1668.She returned to Home Waters in 1670 as Captain Burstow's commission ended on 24 January 1670 as guardship at Sheerness. Captain Thomas Willshaw, RN was in command from 6 July 1671 until 16 April 1672. Captain William Jaccques, RN was her commander from 20 April 1672 to 4 February 1673. Her last commander as guardship was Captain Thomas Page who took command on 19 February 1673 until his death on 21 April 1674. On 29 September 1676 Captain Henry Carverth, RN took command for service in Home waters until 30 April 1678. She was on Channel Service under Captain William Collins, RN from 26 May 1678 until 21 July 1679. Her final commander, Captain Charles Carlisle, RN assumed command on 17 January 1683 for service in the Leeward Islands.

== Loss ==
Francis was wrecked in a hurricane in the Leeward Islands on 1 August 1684.
