= Isaac Barrow (bishop) =

Anglican bishop of Sodor and Man 1663–71, of St Asaph 1669–80

The Right Reverend Isaac Barrow
- Bishop of Sodor and Man
- Diocese: Diocese of Sodor and Man
- In office: 1663–1671
- Predecessor: Samuel Rutter
- Successor: Henry Bridgeman
- Other post: Governor of the Isle of Man (1664–?); Bishop of St Asaph (1669–1680)

Orders
- Consecration: 5 July 1662 by John Cosin

Personal details
- Born: 1613
- Died: 21 June 1680 (aged 66–67)
- Denomination: Anglican
- Education: Peterhouse, Cambridge

Isaac Barrow (1613 – 21 June 1680) was an English clergyman who served, consecutively, as Bishop of Sodor and Man and Bishop of St Asaph, and also served as Governor of the Isle of Man. He was the founder of the Bishop Barrow Trust. During his time as Bishop of Sodor and Man and Governor of the Isle of Man, he enacted significant social, political, and ecclesiastical reforms. He is sometimes confused with his more famous namesake and nephew, Isaac Barrow (1630–1677), the mathematician and theologian.

== Origins and early career ==
Barrow was the son of Isaac Barrow of Spinney Abbey, Wicken, Cambridgeshire, a landowner and justice of the peace for over forty years. In July 1629 he was admitted to Peterhouse, Cambridge, of which he became a fellow in 1635. He was made deacon on 9 June 1639, by Matthew Wren, Bishop of Ely; and ordained priest on 18 December 1641 at the Henry VII Chapel, by John Towers, Bishop of Peterborough. In 1641 he was appointed rector of Hinton, a college living, but was expelled by the Presbyterians in 1643. Thereafter, he served as a chaplain at New College, Oxford, until the surrender of Oxford to the Parliamentary army in 1646.

== Ecclesiastical advancement ==
Following the Restoration (and by now a Doctor of Divinity), Barrow received back his fellowship at Peterhouse and was appointed a Fellow of Eton College on 12 July 1660. In 1660 he was also presented to the rectory of Downham, in the Diocese of Ely.

== Bishop and Governor of Mann ==
On 5 July 1663, having resigned his fellowship of Peterhouse in the previous year, he was consecrated Bishop of Sodor and Man at Westminster Abbey. His nephew, the priest and mathematician Isaac Barrow, preached the consecration sermon. The bishopric was not a lucrative one, and the Isle of Man was in a period of serious economic decline following the English Civil War. Even by 1681, when Cumbrian traveller Thomas Denton visited the Island some time before 1681 he valued the diocese as being "worth £200 a year". The cathedral of St German at Peel was also reportedly in ruins by the time Barrow was appointed in 1663.

By April 1664, Charles Stanley, 8th Earl of Derby also appointed him Governor of the Isle of Man. During his brief residence there he acquired a liberal and reforming reputation, establishing schools and improving the livings of the impoverished clergy. By virtue of his establishment in 1668 of the Bishop Barrow Trust, he is generally regarded as the founder of King William's College (where his arms are displayed on the badge), although the school did not open until 1833.

== Bishop of St Asaph ==
Returning to England for the sake of his health, Barrow lived at Cross-Hall, in Lathom, Lancashire, a house belonging to the Stanley family. On 21 March 1670, he was translated to the See of St Asaph, but he was permitted to hold the see of Sodor and Man in commendam until October 1671, in order to defray the expenses of his translation. At St Asaph, he again displayed energy and zeal, carrying out substantial repairs to the cathedral church and the episcopal palace, as well as building in 1673 an almshouse for eight poor widows. He died at Shrewsbury in 1680 before his plans for a free school at St Asaph came to fruition, but his successor received £200 from his executors to that end.

Barrow is buried in the Cathedral churchyard at St Asaph, where his tombstone was the cause of some theological controversy. It invited those entering the church to pray for his soul — a Catholic practice not generally promoted in the Church of England.

Church of England titles
Preceded by Samuel Rutter	Bishop of Sodor and Man; 1663–1671	Succeeded by Henry Bridgeman
Preceded by Henry Glemham	Bishop of St Asaph; 1669–1680	Succeeded by William Lloyd
