= Jennifer Kewley Draskau =

Manx historian and linguist (died 2024)

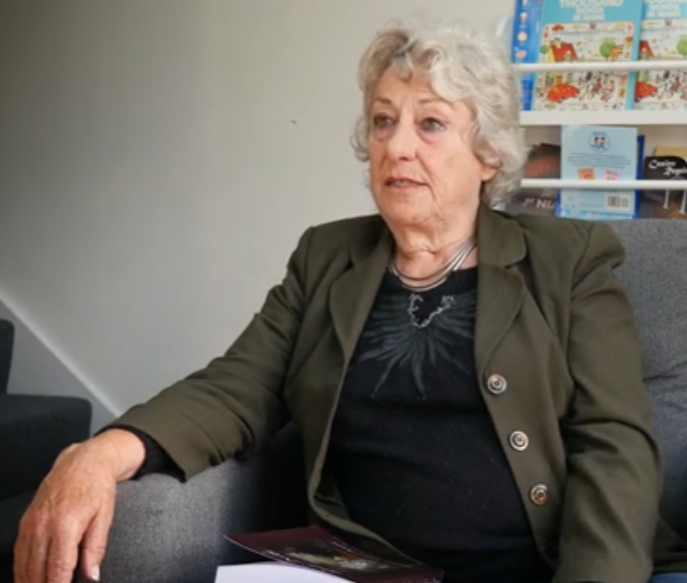
- In a Culture Vannin video in 2020
- Born: Isle of Man
- Died: 21 October 2024; Isle of Man
- Education: The Buchan School; University of Manchester; University of Copenhagen PhD
- Occupations: Historian, linguist, teacher and political candidate
- Writing career
- Notable works: Practical Manx (2008); The Sinking of Immaculate O'Shea (2010, play); Illiam Dhone: Patriot or Traitor? (2012)

Margaret Jennifer Kewley Draskau (died 21 October 2024) was a Manx historian, linguist, teacher, political candidate and prominent figure in Isle of Man culture. She published several books, with her most notable work being the 2008 grammar, spelling and pronunciation reference book on the Manx Gaelic language, Practical Manx.

== Life ==
Draskau was born on the Isle of Man, where her grandfather was a police inspector with the Isle of Man Constabulary. She attended The Buchan School in Castletown, and spent periods of her youth staying with Welsh-speaking cousins in Wales. She was fluent in several languages, including English, Danish, French, German and Manx, and was proficient in many others. She continued her education at the University of Manchester.

Draskau married a Danish man. She lived in Denmark for two decades, where she taught at the University of Copenhagen and the University of Aarhus. In 1987, she received a doctoral degree from the University of Copenhagen for the thesis The Quest for Equivalence: On Translating Villon. She was appointed Honorary Senior Research Fellow in the Department of English at the University of Liverpool and as a Senior Research Fellow at the University's Centre for Manx Studies. She briefly worked as a languages tutor to the royal family in Thailand.

After returning to Man, Draskau taught German at Ramsey Grammar School in Ramsey and introduced Manx Studies to the curriculum. In 1996, she stood for election to the island's lower house of parliament, the House of Keys, in the Michael sheading. She gained 33.65% of the vote, but lost to David Cannan. She also sang with Manx choir Cliogaree Twoaie, bungee jumped and was known to swim in the Irish Sea.

In 2004, she spoke at the Harvard University Celtic Colloquium, delivering a talk titled "Language death and resurrection in the Isle of Man: the continuity of Manx Gaelic exemplified by the use of inflected verb tenses".

In 2006, she published a new translation of the poem An Account of the Isle of Man in Song, the oldest text written in Manx Gaelic (between approximately 1490 and 1530) and which is also known as the Manannan Ballad or Manx Traditionary Ballad.

In 2008, Draskau published the Manx language reference book Practical Manx, which was launched at an event at the Manx Museum, Douglas. Whilst writing Practical Manx, Draskau had studied texts dating back to the 15th century and the 18th-century Manx version of the Bible, as well as exploring the intonation and accent of the language by listening to conversations between fluent native speakers. After the book's publication, she said that: "I hope my book can be a part of this process by providing a grammatical description of the Manx Language, a reference for people who want to learn or teach the language." She also reflected on how UNESCO's Atlas of the World's Languages in Danger declared Manx an extinct language, saying that "Unesco ought to know better than to declare Manx a dead language. There are hundreds of speakers of Manx and while people are able to have productive conversations in the language then it is very much alive and well."

In 2019, she translated the English version of Jon Leirfall's 1979 Norwegian perspective of the history of the Isle of Man, Tusen år på Man (A Thousand Years in Man), for Culture Vannin. She also published articles about the Manx language in numerous academic journals, including the Journal of Terminology Science and Research, the Journal of Celtic Linguistics and in the "Contemporary Issues in Manx Culture" themed special edition of Celtic Cultural Studies.

Draskau was descended from the father of the divisive 17th-century Manx nationalist Illiam Dhone. She published a biography of him titled Illiam Dhone: Patriot or Traitor? in 2012 and said at the book launch that "whatever conclusions readers draw about his standing as a martyr, his story continues to grip generations." A copy of the book was donated to the Tynwald Library, and in 2013 Draskau fundraised for the Isle of Man Agricultural Benevolent Trust after a blizzard by delivering a lecture about her distant relative.

Her other historical research included exploring the World War I internment camps on the Isle of Man. She worked on newspapers from the Douglas Internment Camp and found evidence of black market activity. She put forward the idea that internee female impersonators on the island "played an important role in the social and psychological resilience of heterogeneous all-male societies within the internment camps." Draskau also published Lusitania: Tragedy Or War Crime? featuring new research about the sinking of the liner. The Lusitania had been carrying over 25,000 "enemy alien" internees who had been held in two camps on Man.

As well as non-fiction research, Draskau also wrote award-winning plays and novels. Her research into the Lusitania inspired the play The Sinking of Immaculate O'Shea. It was performed in the Isle of Man and New Zealand. Her 2020 fictional work Transportee aimed to highlight the plight of the Manx men and women who were transported off the island to work in the British colonies during the 17th century.

She died in 2024.

== Selected publications ==
- Margaid of Baldhoon (2000)
- Practical Manx (2008)
- Black Tiger (2013)
- Illiam Dhone: Patriot or Traitor? (2012)
- The Tudor Rose: Princess Mary, Henry VIII's Sister (2013)
- Lusitania: Tragedy Or War Crime? (2015)
- Lady Derby, The Great Whore of Babylon (2020)
- Transportee (2020)
