= Royal Charter of 27 March 1668 =

The Royal Charter of 27 March 1668 was an agreement between the Kingdom of England and the English East India Company. It led to the transfer of Bombay from Charles II of England to the English East India Company for an annual rent of £10 (equivalent retail price index of £1,226 in 2007).
