= Bishop Barrow Trust =

The Bishop Barrow Trust was founded in 1668 by Dr. Isaac Barrow, Bishop of Sodor & Mann (1663-1669). Barrow founded the trust with the idea of building a university on the Isle of Man. He was shocked at the state of knowledge of the Manx clergy and decided that the best way to eradicate their ignorance was to found an institution to educate prospective clergymen. It was not until a hundred and seventy five years later, in 1833, that King William's College, a fee-paying public school rather than a university, opened its doors.

Although there are no paintings of Barrow, his coat of arms survive on his tombstone and on the crest of King William's College. Other than his coat of arms, Barrow left quite a legacy for King William's. The main dining room, and former chapel, of the College is named the Barrovian Hall in his memory, while there is a Barrow House and the Barrovian Society for Old Boys (OKWs). The College's annual magazine is called The Barrovian, while those who have attended King William's can be referred to as Barrovians.

Barrow wrote, "At my coming into the Island, I found the people for the most part loose and vicious in their lives, rude and barbarous in their behaviour; and – which I suppose the cause of this disorder – without any true sense of religion, and, indeed, in a condition almost incapable of being bettered; for they had no means of instruction. Their ministers, it is true, took upon them to preach; but were themselves much fitter to be taught, being very ignorant and wholly illiterate; having had no other education than what that rude place afforded them: not many books among them, nor they intelligent of any but English books, which came very rarely thither."

He founded the Trust in a document dated 7 July 1668.

== See also ==
- King William's College
