= The Buchan School =

Coordinates: 54°04′27″N 4°39′46″W

- Yn Scoill Buchan
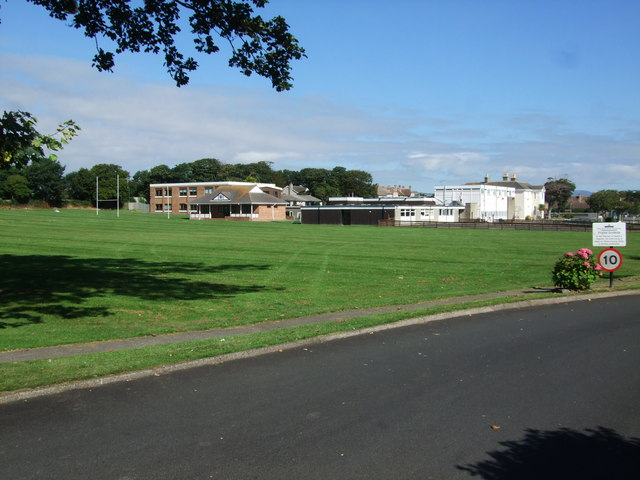
- Castletown, Malew; Isle of Man

Information
- Type: Independent school
- Motto: Fortior Qui Melior
- Established: 1878
- Principal: Mr J.H. Buchanan
- Headmistress: Mrs. Billingsley-Evans
- Deputy Head: None
- Teaching staff: 26
- Enrollment: 171
- Website: https://www.kwc.im/buchan/home

The Buchan School (Manx: Yn Scoill Buchan) is an independent primary school in Castletown in the south of the Isle of Man, catering for children aged 3–11. It is the junior school of King William's College.

== History ==
The Buchan School was established in 1875 by Laura, Lady Buchan (daughter of Colonel Mark Wilks) as a "school for females" and was originally known as The High School for Girls. The original campus was located on Douglas Road, on the promenade in Castletown, however the school soon outgrew its original site and moved to a new site named "Westhill" about a mile away in Arbory Road, Castletown.

As the number of pupils grew there was a need for more space and the senior (age 11 to 18) department was relocated to Bowling Green Road where it was housed in three adjacent terraced houses which had been Lady Laura's house. The junior school and boarders accommodation remained at Westhill and the pupils walked across Castletown between the two bases to use the playing fields at Westhill and along Castletown promenade to King William's College for swimming lessons. In 1991 The Buchan amalgamated with King William's College and changed to a co-educational prep school for King William's College. As of 2005 the school had approximately 250 pupils. The Buchan is the only independent primary school on the Isle of Man.

== Houses ==
The Buchan comprises four houses. Every pupil in the school is a member of one of the houses and represents them in awards and sporting events. The school used to have a boarding house however this closed in 1999. The houses are named after famous Norse rulers of the Isle of Man.

- Magnus - Represented by the colour green
- Olaf - represented by the colour red
- Lagman - represented by the colour blue
- Godred - represented by the colour yellow

In the 1970s two more houses were founded for the boarders - Ivar and Somerled which were represented by gold and purple. These were discontinued after the school ceased to have any boarding facilities.

== The Buchan Badge ==
The School has its own award system - the Buchan Badge. This is awarded to pupils in Prep. (years 3-6) The award is based on the Duke of Edinburgh Award Scheme. Each pupil must take part in, and complete each of the sections of the award; Physical Activity, Country Craft or Field Craft and a Service.

== Motto ==
The motto of The Buchan is Fortior Qui Melior, which means "The Braver The Better".

== Alumni ==
- Jennifer Kewley Draskau - historian, linguist, teacher and political candidate
- Amina J. Mohammed - diplomat, politician, Deputy Secretary-General of the United Nations
