= King William's College =

Private school in the Isle of Man

Location
- Castletown, IM9 1TP; Isle of Man; 54°04′45″N 4°38′06″W

Information
- Type: Public School; Private day and boarding school
- Motto: Assiduitate Non Desidia (By industry not sloth)
- Established: 1833; 193 years ago
- Founder: Bishop Isaac Barrow Trust
- Department for Education URN: 142476 Tables
- Principal: Damian Henderson
- Staff: 67
- Gender: Coeducational
- Age: 4 to 18
- Enrolment: c. 400
- Houses: Colbourne, Dickson, and Walters
- Colours: Burgundy, black, and white
- Publication: The Barrovian
- Alumni: Old King William's ("OKWs")
- Accreditation: World School
- Website: www.kwc.im

King William's College
- Interactive map of King William's College

Ground information

International information
- First men's T20I: 9 July 2023: Isle of Man v {{country data Austria | flag link/core | variant = | size = | name = | altlink = national cricket team | altvar = cricket }}
- Last men's T20I: 10 July 2023: Isle of Man v Austria
- As of 18 July 2023; Source: Ground profile

King William's College (Manx: Colleish Ree Illiam) is a co-educational private school for pupils aged 3 to 18 near Castletown on the Isle of Man. It is a member of the International Baccalaureate and Headmasters' and Headmistresses' Conference organisations. The College operates at two sites: a main senior school campus on the shore of Castletown Bay, and a prep school (The Buchan School) in the Westhill part of Castletown. The College was originally for boys only, but became co-educational in the 1980s. It has roughly five hundred pupils.

The UK Department for Education categorises it as an Overseas British school.

== History ==
The establishment of the College was funded principally by the Bishop Barrow Trust, originally set up in 1668 to provide education in the Isle of Man. Founded in 1833, the College opened its doors with 46 boys. The shield in the centre of the College's coat of arms is that of Bishop Isaac Barrow. The school was named after King William IV, who is said to have been asked for a financial contribution and to have offered the founders "my most valuable possession, my name".

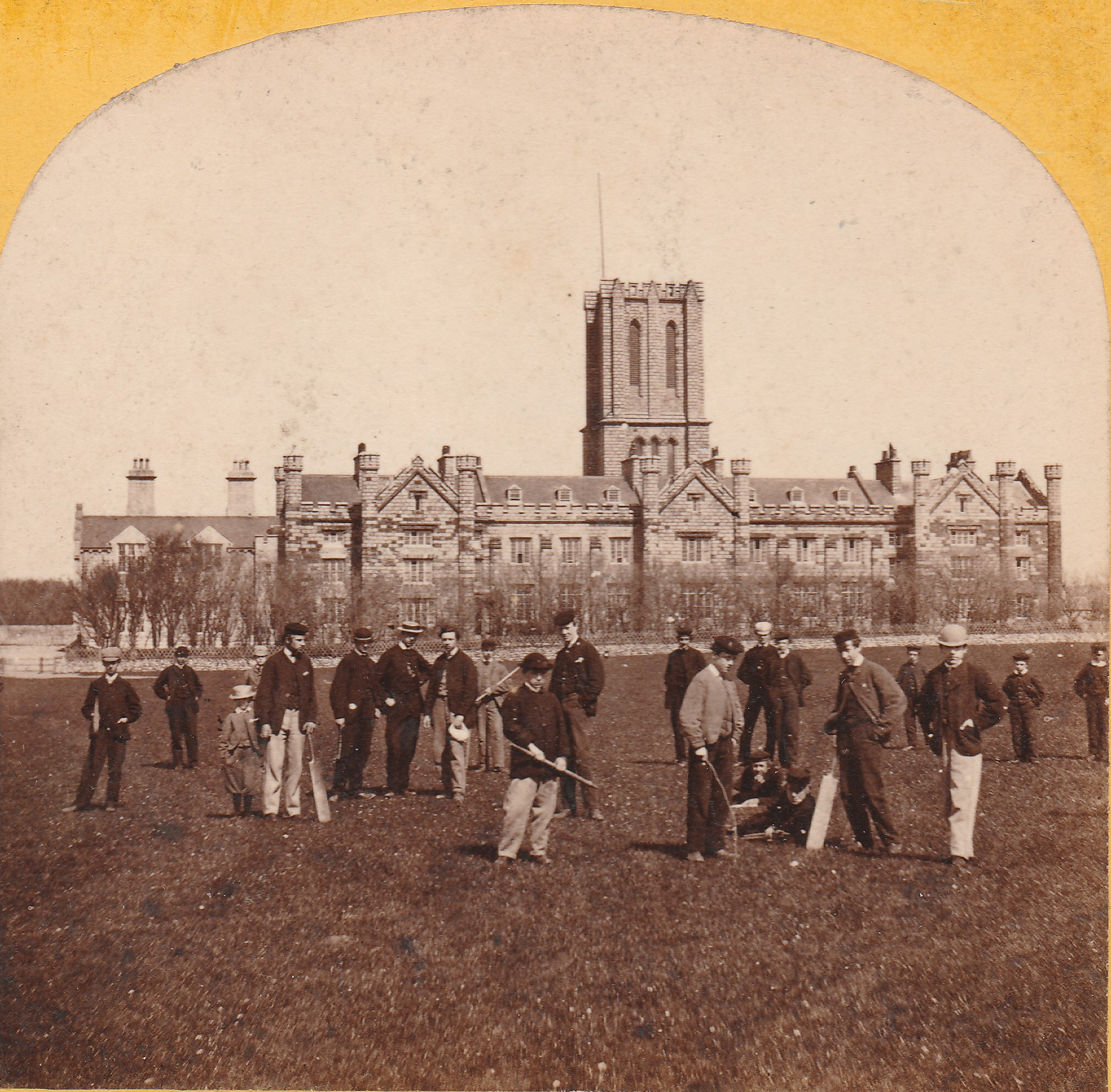
19th-century photograph of the college

The school features, thinly disguised, in the Victorian schoolboy book Eric, or, Little by Little by Dean Farrar who had been a boy at the school. Though the school name was changed to Bishop’s College, it is the central location, too, in the book The Zone by Graham Hamer who was educated at King William's College in the 1960s.

The college is noted for its annual open water half-mile swim in Derbyhaven Bay, which usually takes place in late June, depending on tides and weather conditions. Around thirty pupils and staff take part each year. It is compulsory for all other students to watch the swim.

== General Knowledge Paper (GKP) ==
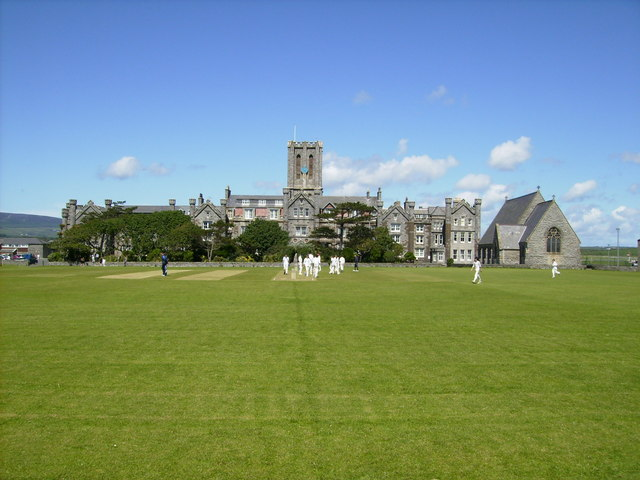
King William's College in 2007.

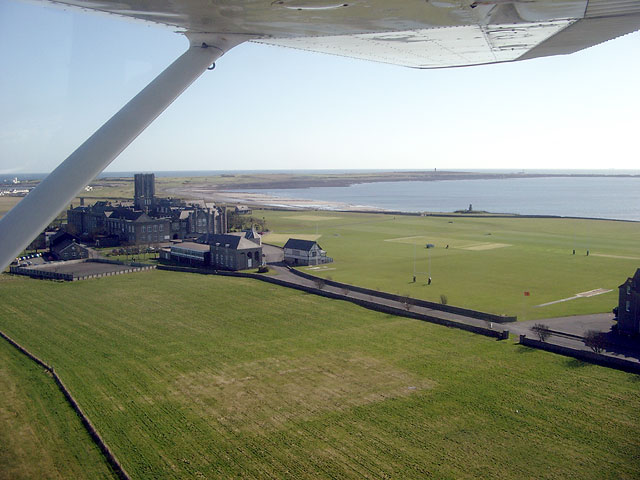
The college seen from the air.

Since 1904, the College has set an annual general knowledge test, known as the General Knowledge Paper (GKP). In the past pupils sat the test twice: once unseen on the day before the Christmas holidays, and again when they returned to school in the New Year, after spending the holiday researching the answers. The test is now voluntary. It is well known to be highly difficult, a common score for the unseen test is just two correct answers from the list (180 questions in 2018). The best scores are 40 to 50 for the unseen test and about 270 out of 360 for the second sitting. Traditionally, the best scorers were given a half day free from school, while anyone doing particularly badly was given a detention.

The quiz is always introduced with the following Latin motto: Scire ubi aliquid invenire possis, ea demum maxima pars eruditionis est, which translates as: "To know where you can find anything is, after all, the greatest part of erudition."

The quiz is popular with non-pupils. It appears on the school's website, and has been published in The Guardian since 1951.

The current quizmaster is Dr Pat Cullen, a retired general practitioner, who has been setting the quiz since 1997. He reports that he now checks questions by typing them into Google and changing them if necessary to ensure the answers cannot be found immediately.

Currently, the GKP is sent home to parents; there is a prize, presented at Founders' Day, for the winning family. There is a competition between the local Manx families over this test.

== Houses ==
- Colbourne House – mixed boarding house
- Dickson House – mixed day house
- Walters House – mixed day house

The original house system was replaced in 2003–2004 with form centres. Whilst the house system was kept by name only, the main social function of the house system was lost. Many OKWs (Old King Williams) still refer to the original house names. Colbourne house was the boys boarding house with School house being the girls' boarding house. School house is situated in the main school, where the female boarders reside and are still referred to as the School house girls, but are now a part of Colbourne house. Around this time, the former Middle School was renamed "Stenning House", which has now been converted into the Buchan School. Junior House remains as a little-used house half way along the College drive.

Original houses

- Hunt house – day boys' house (now occupied by the 5th Form Centre)
- Raglan house – day boys' house (now occupied by the 6th Form Centre)
- Barrow house – day girls' house
- Wilson house – boarding boys' house
- Colbourne house – Boarding boys' house
- Dickson house – Boarding boys' house
- School house – Boarding boys' house, later boarding girls' house

== Praepositors ==
A praepositor is an equivalent of a prefect: a member of the Upper Sixth who has considerable responsibility within the school. The title Head of School is given to the most senior Praepositor. The Head of School can be either male or female. Depending on the gender of the Head of School, their subordinate colleague will be known as either the Head Boy or the Head Girl. The Head of School is a long-established post, with the first recorded appointment in 1846.

== Combined Cadet Force ==
The King William's College Combined Cadet Force (CCF) is a voluntary youth organisation sponsored by the UK Ministry of Defence. The College has a long and proud military history; its Officers' Training Corps (OTC) was the only contingent to see active service in the Great War, guarding prisoners of war at Douglas and providing the first recruits from the Island. 546 members of the College community served in the First World War with 45 killed and 45 wounded from the OTC alone. In the Second World War 696 served. Former cadets have won many honours in times of war, including 7 Distinguished Service Orders, 2 Distinguished Service Crosses, 25 Military Crosses, 2 Croix de Guerre, 3 Military Medals and 3 Distinguished Conduct Medals.

Established in 1911 by Lt K.A.R. Sugden, the OTC comprised two platoons. After the First World War, the OTC continued in its role of providing basic military training in the inter-war years. Notably, it mounted a guard of honour for the visit of King George V and Queen Mary to the Isle of Man in July 1920. This OTC unit later evolved into the Junior Training Corps (JTC) about a year before the beginning of the Second World War. Again in 1945 the JTC provided a guard of honour as the College welcomed King George VI and Queen Elizabeth, the first Royal guests to the College. In 1948 Field Marshal Viscount Montgomery visited the school. In that same year, the CCF was established as the JTC was integrated with the Air Training Corps (ATC) and Sea Cadet Corps (SCC) at King William's College. Membership of the CCF was compulsory for all students in their 3rd, 4th and 5th years until 2005. From 2011 students from Castle Rushen High School have been invited to join the Force. To this day, the CCF provides a guard of honour on Tynwald Day.

Under the auspices of the CCF, King William's College joined the Duke of Edinburgh's Award scheme in 1966. Since 2007, however, the scheme has been run independently of the cadet force.

The modern-day CCF consists of three sections: Army, Royal Navy (RN) and Royal Air Force (RAF).

Cadets in the Army Section learn basic military skills, such as marksmanship and fieldcraft, in addition to expedition skills. Senior cadets are responsible for the development of the training programme and the instruction of junior cadets. The training programme follows the Army Proficiency Certificate (APC) syllabus and a practical approach is adopted together with integrated scenarios. At the end of each academic year, the cadets have the chance to participate in a week-long camp at a military establishment.

The RN Section provides cadets with the opportunity to experience different water-based activities, for example, sailing and kayaking. The Naval Proficiency Certificate syllabus is followed to develop seamanship knowledge and skills, such as rope work.

The RAF Section follows the prescribed Air Cadet Proficiency (ACP) syllabus, including airmanship and navigation. Essential qualities, like self-discipline, teamwork, and leadership, are developed through the conduction of practical leadership tasks and navigation activities.

The Cadet Vocational Qualifications Organisation (CVQO) has offered cadets the opportunity to receive internationally recognised BTEC Diploma qualifications. All cadets over the age of 16 may register for any of the qualifications on offer.

== Sports ==
King Williams College has a long sporting history, the College's unique site in Castletown allows for a variety of sports to be played, and its cricket pitches are used for international competitions, such as in July 2023 when the College's grounds hosted Isle of Man vs Austria in the T20I. The College fields several competitive teams in a number of sports including Rugby, Football, Hockey, Cricket, Basketball, Netball, and Golf, among others.

The school's most historic and prestigious fixture is the 1 XV Rugby match against Liverpool College a school in Liverpool, England. The match has been played since 1903, the current format consists of two legs, with the overall winner being awarded the Mark Richard Wheeler Memorial Cup, the cup is dedicated in memory of Mark Wheeler, who was a parent of a KWC 1XV player who died.

== Notable alumni ==
Former pupils, staff, and governors of King William's College may place the letters OKW after their name.

- Sir William Henry Bragg, Nobel Laureate in Physics 1915
- Sir James Gell, First Deemster and the first Manxman to be appointed Attorney General of the Isle of Man
- T.E. Brown, poet and writer
- David Cannan MHK, former Speaker of the House of Keys, Treasury Minister and former MHK for Michael
- Alfred Cannan MHK, Chief Minister of the Isle of Man and former Treasury Minister
- Lieutenant-Colonel Jack Malcolm Thorpe Fleming Churchill, notable commando commander in the Second World War
- Andrew Corlett, the First Deemster of the Isle of Man
- Joseph George Cumming, geologist and archaeologist
- Thomas Wortley Drury, Bishop of Sodor and Man 1907–1911
- Rev. John Ellerton, hymn writer and hymnologist. Wrote "The day Thou gavest, Lord, is ended"
- Rev. Frederic William Farrar, Dean of Canterbury 1895–1903
- Major-General Francis John Fowler, Commander of the Derajat Brigade 1914–16
- Brigadier-General Arthur Henry Seton Hart-Synnot (1870–1942)
- Henry Higgins (bullfighter), also known as Canadas and El Ingles, matador
- George Noel Hill (1893–1985), Manchester City Architect
- Major Robert Johnston, recipient of the Victoria Cross – South African War
- Sir James Haldane Stewart Lockhart, Registrar General and Colonial Secretary of Hong Kong
- Lieutenant-General Sir Terence Douglas Herbert McMeekin
- Brian Ivor Dennis McMeekin
- Lieutenant-Colonel Sir John Mayhew MP, Conservative politician
- Professor Alan Muir (1925–1974) anatomist
- Pierre Novellie – South African/Manx stand-up, television and radio comedian
- Sir Joseph Davidson Qualtrough SHK, former Speaker of the House of Keys
- William Henry Quilliam also known as Abdullah Quilliam, Muslim convert, born in Liverpool of a wealthy Manx family
- Captain William Henry Irvine Shakespear, civil servant and explorer of Northern Arabia
- George Robert Stephenson, pioneer English railway engineer
- John C. Taylor, inventor and Chairman of Strix Ltd.
- Donald Teare, British pathologist
- William Arthur White, British diplomat in Eastern Europe and Turkey
- James Wilson, theologian and astronomer
- George Neilson, historian and antiquary
- Brian Christian , School Master
- Rear Admiral James Carine, Naval Officer

=== Victoria Cross holders ===
Three OKWs have won the Victoria Cross:

- Second Anglo-Afghan War
  - George Stuart White, born 1835, died 1912, Commander-in-Chief, India 1893–1898, Governor of Gibraltar 1900–1905, hero of Ladysmith, he won the VC while holding the rank of Major.
- Second Boer War
  - Major Robert Johnston (1872–1950). He was a Captain when he won the VC.
- Second World War
  - Major Robert Henry Cain (1909–1974).
