= Centre for Manx Studies =

Coordinates: 54.1483°N 4.4944°W

The Centre for Manx Studies (Manx: Laare-Studeyrys Manninagh) is a department of the School of Archaeology, Classics and Egyptology in the University of Liverpool whose focus is the study of the Isle of Man, the Manx language, and Manx culture and history.

The primary functions of the Centre for Manx Studies are: to teach undergraduate and postgraduate students; to carry out archaeological, cultural, environmental and historical research of international significance in the Isle of Man; to further the international recognition of the Isle of Man in these subjects. In addition to postgraduate research degrees, the centre offers a full-time and a part-time master's degree in Manx Studies and a full-time Diploma in Manx Studies.

Founded in 1992, the Centre for Manx Studies was managed by a committee which included representatives from the three partner organizations: the University of Liverpool, the Isle of Man Department of Education, and Manx National Heritage. Originally located near the Manx Museum in the capital city of Douglas, the Centre for Manx Studies relocated in September 2009 to a newly refurbished stable block at the Nunnery estate south of Douglas.

In July 2015 the Centre for Manx Studies moved its base off the Isle of Man to the University of Liverpool's main campus: announcing this measure in April 2015, Fiona Beveridge - executive pro-vice-chancellor for Humanities and Social Sciences - stated:

Given the withdrawal of support by the Manx Government, we have decided that we can no longer sustain the Centre in the Isle of Man. We remain committed to high quality archaeological research across the UK and Ireland and our work in this area on the Isle of Man, for example on Iron Age settlements and WW1 sites, will continue. The Isle of Man is an excellent base to teach archaeological techniques to students and we will continue to undertake field school activities on the island.

Notable alumni and academics have included the Manx historian and linguist Jennifer Kewley Draskau.
