= European Museum of the Year Award =

Annual award under the Council of Europe

- Awarded for: Unique atmosphere, imaginative interpretation and presentation, a creative approach to education and social responsibility.
- Sponsored by: Council of Europe; European Museum Forum
- Date: April–May
- Location: Various European cities
- First award: 1977
- Final award: 2025
- Website: europeanforum.museum
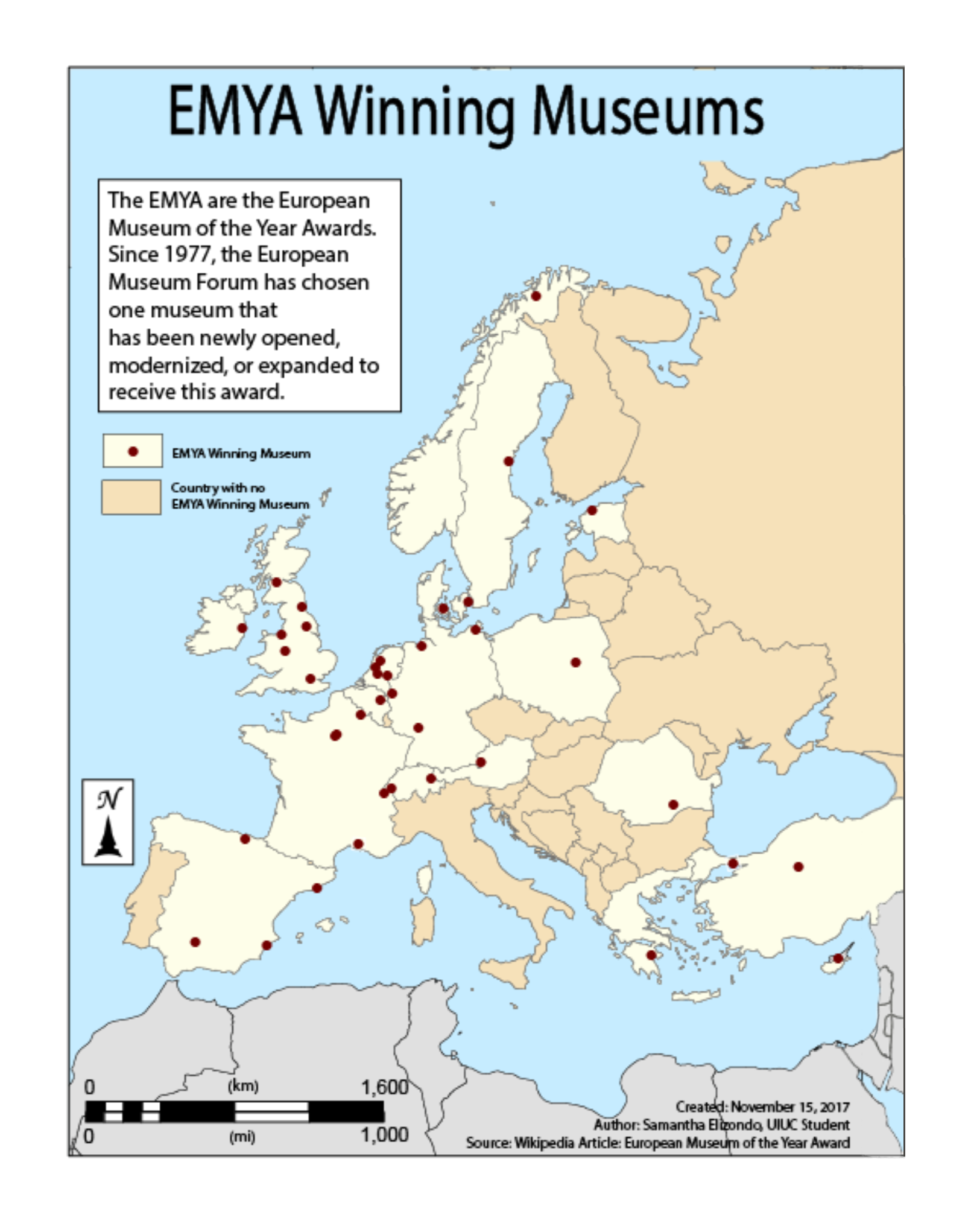
- 2017 Map of European Museum of the Year Award-winning museum locations

The European Museum of the Year Award (EMYA) is presented each year by the European Museum Forum (EMF) under the auspices of the Council of Europe. The EMYA is considered the most important annual award in the European museum sector.

== History ==
The EMYA was founded in 1977 by British journalist Kenneth Hudson, British academic Richard Hoggart, and John Letts, under the auspices of the Council of Europe. It is considered to be the most important award in its sector, being described by the Network of European Museums (NEMO) as "the longest-running and most prestigious museum awards in Europe".

The Fonds de dotation de l’ICOM of the International Council of Museums supports the European Museum of the Year Award.

== Awards ==
=== Categories ===
Since 1977, the EMF has presented two main awards:

- European Museum of the Year
- Council of Europe Museum Prize

Three additional prizes were subsequently added to the EMF awards:

- In 2010, the Kenneth Hudson Award for daring achievement.
- In 2011, the Silletto Prize for community/cultural engagement.
- In 2019, the Portimão Museum Prize for the most welcoming museum.
- In 2020, the Meyvaert Museum Prize for Sustainability for "exceptional commitment to social, economic and environmental sustainability".

=== Criteria ===
The EMF state that the European Museum of the Year is based on:

This award goes to a museum which contributes most directly to attracting audiences and satisfying its visitors with unique atmosphere, imaginative interpretation and presentation, a creative approach to education and social responsibility.

— European Museum Forum, (2019).

The EMF state that the Council of Europe Museum Prize is based on:

This prestigious prize is awarded on the recommendations of the EMYA Judging Panel, by the Committee on Culture, Science and Education of the Council of Europe to a museum which puts particular emphasis on a clearly understandable presentation of a European perspective and of the interplay between local and European identities, working with themes of European relevance and adhering to key values and priorities of democracy, human rights, tolerance and intercultural dialogue, of bridging cultures and overcoming social and political borders.

— European Museum Forum, (2019).

=== Judging ===
Museums in 47 European countries, all members of the Council of Europe, can take part in the competition if they are newly opened or have undergone modernization or expansion in the past three years.

== European Museum of the Year winners (1977–present) ==
The following are the winners of the main European Museum of the Year award:

| Year | Image | Museum | Location | Country |
|---|---|---|---|---|
| 1977 | | Ironbridge Gorge Museum Trust | Ironbridge | United Kingdom |
| 1978 | | Schloss Rheydt Museum | Mönchengladbach | West Germany |
| 1979 | | Museum of the Camargue | Arles | France |
| 1980 | | Catharine Convent Museum | Utrecht | Netherlands |
| 1981 | | Peloponnesian Folklore Foundation | Nafplio | Greece |
| 1982 | | Museum of Art and History | Saint-Denis | France |
| 1983 | | Museum Sarganserland | Sargans | Switzerland |
| 1984 | | Zuiderzee Museum | Enkhuizen | Netherlands |
| 1986 | | Museum of Medieval Stockholm | Stockholm | Sweden |
| 1987 | | Beamish Museum | Stanley | United Kingdom |
| 1988 | | Brandts Museum | Odense | Denmark |
| 1989 | | Sundsvall Museum | Sundsvall | Sweden |
| 1990 | | Fourmies-Trélon Regional Ecomuseum | Fourmies | France |
| 1991 | | Leventio Museum | Nicosia | Cyprus |
| 1992 | | State Museum of Technology and Work | Mannheim | Germany |
| 1993 | | Alta Museum | Alta | Norway |
| 1994 | | National Museum of Denmark | Copenhagen | Denmark |
| 1995 | | Olympic Museum | Lausanne | Switzerland |
| 1996 | | Museum of the Romanian Peasant | Bucharest | Romania |
| 1997 | | Museum of Anatolian Civilizations | Ankara | Turkey |
| 1998 | | National Conservation Centre | Liverpool | United Kingdom |
| 1999 | | French Museum of Playing Cards | Issy-les-Moulineaux | France |
| 2000 | | Guggenheim Museum Bilbao | Bilbao | Spain |
| 2001 | | National Railway Museum | York | United Kingdom |
| 2002 | | Chester Beatty Library | Dublin | Ireland |
| 2003 | | Victoria and Albert Museum - British Galleries | London | United Kingdom |
| 2004 | | Archaeological Museum of Alicante | Alicante | Spain |
| 2005 | | Netherlands Open Air Museum | Arnhem | Netherlands |
| 2006 | | CosmoCaixa | Barcelona | Spain |
| 2007 | | German Emigration Center | Bremerhaven | Germany |
| 2008 | | Kumu Art Museum | Tallinn | Estonia |
| 2009 | | Salzburg Museum | Salzburg | Austria |
| 2010 | | Ozeaneum | Stralsund | Germany |
| 2011 | | Gallo-Roman Museum of Tongeren | Tongeren | Belgium |
| 2012 | | Medina Azahara Museum | Córdoba | Spain |
| 2013 | | Riverside Museum | Glasgow | United Kingdom |
| 2014 | | The Museum of Innocence | Istanbul | Turkey |
| 2015 | | Rijksmuseum | Amsterdam | Netherlands |
| 2016 | | POLIN Museum of the History of Polish Jews | Warsaw | Poland |
| 2017 | | Musée d'ethnographie de Genève | Geneva | Switzerland |
| 2018 | | Design Museum | London | United Kingdom |
| 2019 | | Rijksmuseum Boerhaave | Leiden | Netherlands |
| 2020 | | Stapferhaus | Lenzburg | Switzerland |
| 2021 | | Naturalis Biodiversity Center | Leiden | Netherlands |
| 2022 | | Museum of the Mind | Haarlem | Netherlands |
| 2023 | | L'Etno Valencian Museum of Ethnology | Valencia | Spain |
| 2024 | | Sámi Museum Siida | Inari | Finland |
| 2025 | | Manchester Museum | Manchester | United Kingdom |

== Council of Europe Museum Prize winners (1977–) ==
The following are the winners of the Council of Europe Museum Prize award:

| Year | Image | Museum | Location | Country |
|---|---|---|---|---|
| 1977 | | Fundació Joan Miró | Barcelona | Spain |
| 1978 | | Bryggens Museum | Bergen | Norway |
| 1979 | | Municipal Museum Rüsselsheim | Rüsselsheim am Main | Germany |
| 1980 | | Monaghan County Museum | Monaghan | Ireland |
| 1981 | | Stockholm Music Museum | Stockholm | Sweden |
| 1982 | | Åland Museum | Mariehamn | Finland |
| 1983 | | Joanneum - The Provincial Museum of Styria | Graz | Austria |
| 1984 | | Living Museum of the Canal du Centre | Thieu | Belgium |
| 1984 | | National Waterways Museum | Ellesmere Port | United Kingdom |
| 1987 | | Museum Neukölln | Berlin | Germany |
| 1988 | | Bavarian National Museum | Munich | Germany |
| 1988 | | Convent of Las Descalzas Reales Museum | Madrid | Spain |
| 1989 | | Joods Historisch Museum | Amsterdam | Netherlands |
| 1990 | | Manuel da Maia Museum of Water | Lisbon | Portugal |
| 1991 | | German Salt Museum | Lüneburg | Germany |
| 1992 | | Argenta Marsh Museum | Argenta, Emilia–Romagna | Italy |
| 1993 | | İstanbul Archaeology Museums | Istanbul | Turkey |
| 1994 | | Provincial Museum of Lapland | Rovaniemi | Finland |
| 1995 | | Haus der Geschichte | Bonn | Germany |
| 1996 | | Museum of Applied Arts, Vienna | Vienna | Austria |
| 1997 | | Tropenmuseum Junior | Amsterdam | Netherlands |
| 1998 | | Museum Centre on Strelka | Krasnoyarsk | Russia |
| 1999 | | Palais des Beaux-Arts de Lille | Lille | France |
| 2000 | | In Flanders Fields Museum | Ypres | Belgium |
| 2001 | | Helsinki Theatre Museum | Helsinki | Finland |
| 2002 | | Buddenbrookhaus | Lübeck | Germany |
| 2003 | | Laténium | Hauterive, Neuchâtel | Switzerland |
| 2004 | | Museum of Health Care | Edirne | Turkey |
| 2005 | | Museum of Byzantine Culture | Thessaloniki | Greece |
| 2006 | | Churchill War Rooms | London | United Kingdom |
| 2007 | | International Museum of the Reformation | Geneva | Switzerland |
| 2008 | | Svalbard Museum | Longyearbyen | Norway |
| 2009 | | Zeeuws Museum | Middelburg | Netherlands |
| 2010 | | Portimão Museum | Portimão | Portugal |
| 2012 | | Rautenstrauch-Joest Museum | Cologne | Germany |
| 2013 | | Museum of Liverpool | Liverpool | United Kingdom |
| 2014 | | Baksı Museum | Bayburt | Turkey |
| 2015 | | Museum of European and Mediterranean Civilisations | Marseille | France |
| 2016 | | European Solidarity Centre | Gdańsk | Poland |
| 2017 | | ACTe Memorial | Pointe-à-Pitre | France |
| 2018 | | War Childhood Museum | Sarajevo | Bosnia and Herzegovina |
| 2019 | | Museum für Kommunikation Bern | Bern | Switzerland |
| 2020 | | Museum of Secret Surveillance | Tirana | Albania |
| 2021 | | Gulag History Museum | Moscow | Russia |
| 2022 | | Nano Nagle Place | Cork | Ireland |
| 2023 | | The Workers Museum | Copenhagen | Denmark |
| 2024 | | Sybir Memorial Museum | Białystok | Poland |
| 2025 | | Euskararen Etxea | Bilbao | Spain |
| 2026 | | Young V&A | Bethnal Green | United Kingdom |

== Kenneth Hudson Award winners (2010–) ==
The following are the winners of the Kenneth Hudson Award:

| Year | Image | Museum | Location | Country |
|---|---|---|---|---|
| 2010 | | Museum of Contraception and Abortion | Vienna | Austria |
| 2011 | | Museum of Broken Relationships | Zagreb | Croatia |
| 2012 | | Glasnevin Museum | Dublin | Ireland |
| 2013 | | Batalha Municipal Community Museum | Batalha | Portugal |
| 2014 | | Žanis Lipke Memorial | Riga | Latvia |
| 2015 | | International Red Cross and Red Crescent Museum | Geneva | Switzerland |
| 2016 | | Micropia | Amsterdam | Netherlands |
| 2017 | | Museum of the First President of Russia Boris Yeltsin | Yekaterinburg | Russia |
| 2018 | | Estonian National Museum | Tartu | Estonia |
| 2019 | | World Museum Vienna | Vienna | Austria |
| 2020 | | House of Austrian History | Vienna | Austria |
| 2021 | | CosmoCaixa Barcelona | Barcelona | Spain |
| 2022 | | Wayne Modest, Nanette Snoep, Laura van Broekhoven & Leontine Meijer-van Mensch | n/a | n/a |
| 2023 | | 23,5 Hrant Dink Site of Memory | Istanbul | Turkey |
| 2024 | | Ihor Poshyvailo | Kyiv | Ukraine |
| 2025 | | Nini Sanadiradze | Tbilisi | Georgia |

== Silletto Prize winners (2011–) ==
The following are the winners of the Silletto Prize:

| Year | Image | Museum | Location | Country |
|---|---|---|---|---|
| 2011 | | Watersnoodmuseum | Ouwerkerk | Netherlands |
| 2012 | | TOPIC International Puppets Center | Tolosa | Spain |
| 2013 | | Museum aan de Stroom | Antwerp | Belgium |
| 2014 | | Saurer Museum | Arbon | Switzerland |
| 2015 | | Familistère de Guise | Guise | France |
| 2016 | | Vukovar City Museum | Vukovar | Croatia |
| 2017 | | Leiria Museum | Leiria | Portugal |
| 2018 | | Betina Museum of Wooden Shipbuilding | Betina | Croatia |
| 2019 | | Shipwreck Museum St. George | Thorsminde | Denmark |
| 2020 | | 14 Henrietta Street | Dublin | Ireland |
| 2021 | | Kenan Yavuz Ethnography Museum | Bayburt | Turkey |
| 2022 | | Museum of Footwear and Industry | Inca | Spain |
| 2023 | | Otar Lordkipanidze Vani Archaeological Museum of Georgian National Museum | Vani | Georgia |
| 2024 | | Kalamaja Museum | Tallinn | Estonia |
| 2025 | | Alvor Lifeguard Interpretative Centre | Portimão | Portugal |

== Portimão Museum Prize winners (2019–) ==
The following are the winners of the Portimão Museum Prize:

| Year | Image | Museum | Location | Country |
|---|---|---|---|---|
| 2019 | | Brunel's SS Great Britain | Bristol | United Kingdom |
| 2020 | | MO Museum | Vilnius | Lithuania |
| 2021 | | Gruuthusemuseum | Bruges | Belgium |
| 2022 | | University Museum of Bergen | Bergen | Norway |
| 2023 | | Chillida Leku | Hernani | Spain |
| 2024 | | Salt Museum | Messolonghi | Greece |
| 2025 | | Istanbul Modern | Istanbul | Turkey |

== Meyvaert Museum Prize for Sustainability winners (2020–) ==
The following are the winners of the Meyvaert Museum Prize for Sustainability:

| Year | Image | Museum | Location | Country |
|---|---|---|---|---|
| 2020 | | Wadden Sea Centre | Ribe | Denmark |
| 2021 | | Museum Walserhaus | Bosco/Gurin | Switzerland |
| 2022 | | Holmegaard Glass Factory | Holmegaard | Denmark |
| 2023 | | Swiss Museum of Agriculture | Alberswil | Switzerland |
| 2024 | | Museum of the Home | London | United Kingdom |
| 2025 | | MUZOO | La Chaux-de-Fonds | Switzerland |

== See also ==
- List of awards for contributions to culture
- Europa Nostra
- The Best in Heritage
- Museum of the Year
