= List of awards for contributions to culture =

This list of awards for contributions to culture is an index to articles about notable awards for contributions to culture in a general sense. The awards listed here have a relatively open-ended scope, e.g. they apply to the arts irrespective of category. Alternatively, they pertain to a culture-related field that is not covered by a more specific list, such as promotion of culture, conservation of cultural heritage, museums, etc. The list is organized by region and country of the award sponsor, but some awards are open to people or organizations around the world.

== List ==
Country	Award	First awarded / established	Venue / sponsor	Notes
Belgium/Netherlands (European Union)	European Union Prize for Cultural Heritage/Europa Nostra Awards	2002	Europa Nostra	Best practice in heritage conservation.
Denmark	Crown Prince Couple's Awards	2004	Frederik, Crown Prince of Denmark; Mary, Crown Princess of Denmark	Exceptional achievement in the arts and culture and in social work
Denmark	Sonning Prize	1950 / 1959	University of Copenhagen	Outstanding contributions to European culture
Faroe Islands	Faroese Cultural Prize	1998	Faroe government	Faroese writers, musicians, artists etc.
Germany	Herder Prize	1964	Alfred Toepfer Foundation	Scholars and artists from Central and Southeast Europe whose life and work have contributed to the cultural understanding of European countries and their peaceful interrelations. Discontinued and merged in 2007 to create the KAIROS Prize.
Germany	KAIROS Prize	2007	Alfred Toepfer Foundation	European artists and scholars from the fields of visual and performing arts, music, architecture, design, film, photography, literature and journalism.
Germany	Maecenas-Ehrung	1989	Association of Independent Cultural Institutions	Personalities that have significantly promoted art and culture in Germany.
Jamaica	Prime Minister's Medal of Appreciation	1983	Prime Minister of Jamaica	Significant contribution to the economic, social, cultural or political development of Jamaica or to Jamaicans residing abroad
Japan	Nikkei Asia Prize	1996	The Nikkei	People in Asia who have made significant contributions in regional growth; science, technology and innovation; or culture
Nepal	Danyahira Sirpa	2004	Nepal Bhasa Academy	Outstanding contributions or achievements in the field of Newari literature or music
Netherlands	Erasmus Prize	1958	Praemium Erasmianum Foundation	Individuals or institutions that have made exceptional contributions to culture, society, or social science in Europe and the rest of the world
North Korea	People's Prize	1958	People's Prize Awarding Commission	Achievements in arts and sciences
United Kingdom (Council of Europe)	European Museum of the Year Award	1977	European Museum Forum	Unique atmosphere, imaginative interpretation and presentation, a creative approach to education and social responsibility
United Kingdom	Museum of the Year	1973	Art Fund	Museum or gallery in the United Kingdom for a track record of imagination, innovation and excellence
United States	Handel Medallion	1959	Government of New York City	Individuals for their contribution to the city's intellectual and cultural life.
United States	Heinz Awards	1993	Heinz Foundations	Contributions in Arts and Humanities; Environment; Human Condition; Public Policy; and Technology, the Economy and Employment
United States	Howland Memorial Prize	1916	Yale University	Achievement of marked distinction in the field of literature or fine arts or the science of government
United States	Library of Congress Living Legend	2000	Library of Congress	Creative contributions to American life Retired in 2018.
United States	St. Louis Walk of Fame	1989	Joe Edwards	Notable people from St. Louis, Missouri, who made contributions to the culture of the United States

== See also ==
- The Best in Heritage
