= Ioanna Papantoniou =

Greek author, designer and folklorist (1936–2026)

Ioanna Papantoniou (Greek: Ιωάννα Παπαντωνίου; 7 January 1936 – 25 February 2026) was a Greek author, scenic designer, costume designer and folklorist. She was the founder and president of the Peloponnesian Folklore Foundation in Nafplio, winner of the 1981 European Museum of the Year Award.

== Life and career ==
=== Early life ===
Papantoniou was born in Athens on 7 January 1936. Her father was Vasilios Papantoniou, one of Kyknos Canning Company owners while her mother was descendant of a wealthy family. During the Axis occupation of Greece she lived with her family in Athens under difficult circumstances while her father was killed during Dekemvriana. During the 1950s, she studied in a Finishing school in United Kingdom. She married at the age of 20; however, that marriage ended in divorce in 1966. She studied scenic and costume design at Wimbledon College of Art.

=== Work ===
Beginning in 1971, Papantoniou made a notable professional career as a scenic and costume designer working along with Michael Elliott, Karolos Koun, Alexis Minotis, Katina Paxinou etc. She was the first female scenic designer of the National Theatre of Greece and Epidaurus' theatre.

From 1992 until 1996, she was professor at the universities of Athens and Peloponnese.

From 1956 until the 1980s, Papantoniou carried an extensive fieldwork throughout Greece, Cyprus, and the Griko communities of Italy, gathering data and documents about the traditional culture, music, and dance and also about the preindustrial technology and old-fashioned children's games. She is also the author of several publications about the Greek local costumes and fashion.

=== Peloponnesian Folklore Foundation ===
In 1974, Papantoniou founded the Peloponnesian Folklore Foundation, a nonprofit cultural institution and museum based in Nafplion, in memory of her father Vasilios Papantoniou. For the needs of the institution, she donated to PFF almost her entire property, including her personal folklore collection. In 1981, PFF was awarded the European Museum of the Year Award.

=== Death ===
Papantoniou died on 25 February 2026, at the age of 90.

== Awards and honours ==
In 1982, Papantoniou was honoured by the National Academy of Athens for her contribution in arts and theatre. In 1987, she received an award during the Thessaloniki International Film Festival for her costume work for the film Doxombus. In 2013, she was awarded the Lifetime Achievement Award by the European Museum Academy.
