= Yannis Tseklenis =

Greek fashion designer (1937–2020)

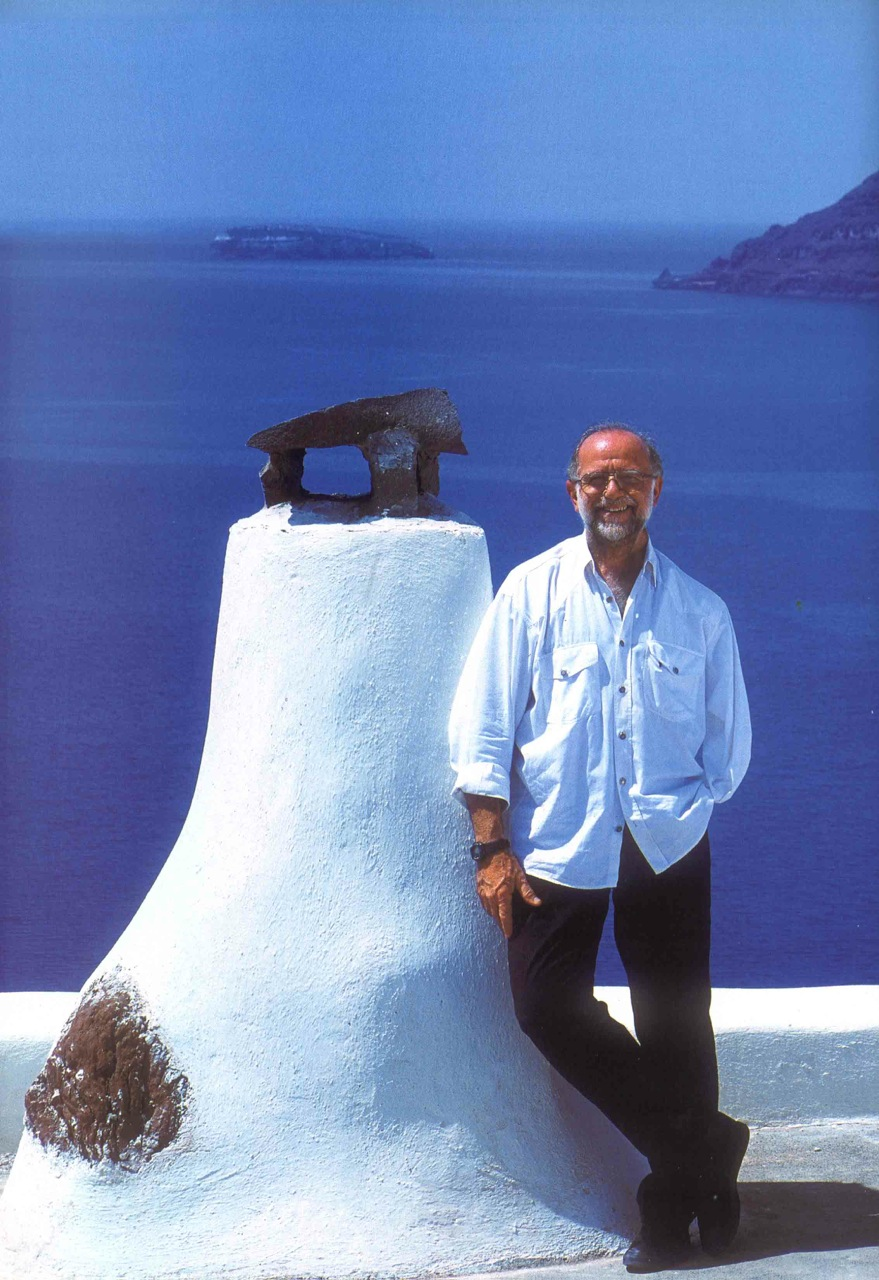
- Yannis Tseklenis (2003)
- Born: Ioannis Tseklenis; 6 November 1937; Athens, Greece
- Died: 29 January 2020 (aged 82)
- Label: Tseklenis
- Spouse(s): Aspa Pesmazoglou; 1 son Efi Mela
- Awards: Silver Cross of the order of Phoenix; Maiden of Cyclades (Hellenic Fashion Centre); Gold Medal of Fashion (Hellenic Fashion Centre); Diolkos Prize of Hellenic Marketing Academy

Yannis Tseklenis (Greek; Γιάννης Τσεκλένης; 6 November 1937 – 29 January 2020) was a Greek fashion designer.

== Early life ==
Born in Athens, Greece on 6 November 1937, he was the son of Costas Tseklenis from Pyrgos, Elis regional unit (located in the Peloponnese area of Greece) and of Melania Pastirmadji who was born in Constantinople. He grew up and completed his studies in Athens. He attended Athens College and graduated from the Moraitis School.

== Personal life ==
In 1960 he married Aspa Pesmazoglou and eventually divorced in 1965. They had one son, Constantinos Tseklenis, a conceptual artist and cinematographer, born in 1963. In 1976 Yannis Tseklenis married his second wife, the model and Miss Greece of 1954, Efi Melas, with whom he had been living since 1965.

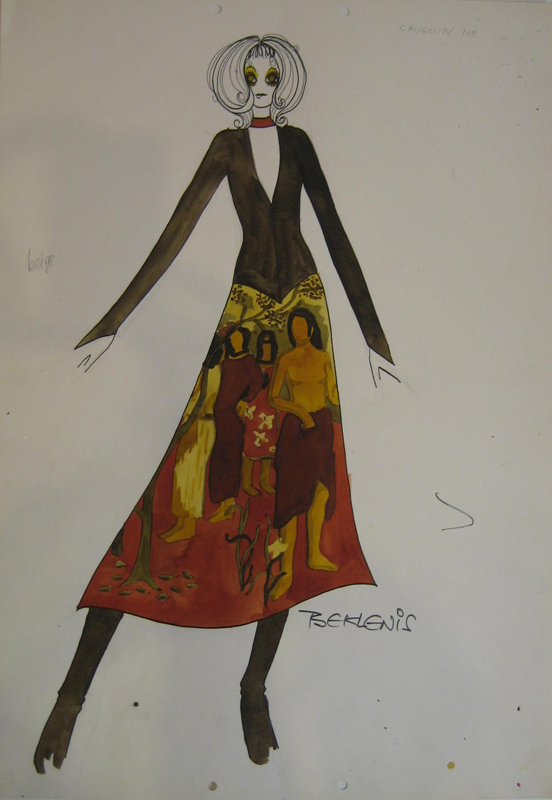
"Impressionists" Collection by Tseklenis, 1971-2. (PFF collection)

== Career ==
=== Summary ===
Yannis Tseklenis is recognised today as the leading Greek fashion designer of the second half of the 20th century who introduced Greek fashion to the contemporary international fashion world. His creations from 1965 to 1991 were sold worldwide by leading stores in more than 30 countries.

During the 1960s and 1970s, he drew inspiration from Greek and world cultural styles, which he developed for fashion in his textile patterns. His collections featured designs inspired by ancient Greek vases, Byzantine manuscripts, traditional Greek wood carvings and paintings; African, Chinese, Indonesian, Russian, and Spanish art; heraldry; insects; cartoons; Persian tapestries; the Unicorn tapestries; and paintings by the Impressionists, Dominicos Theotokopoulos (El Greco), Henri Rousseau, and Yannis Gaitis.

By the late 1970s and 1980s the Tseklenis brand name could also be found on distinguished lines of house linens, wall and floor tiles, luggage, hosiery, uniforms, as well as the interior designs of cars, aircraft and hotels. His work was praised worldwide by leading fashion editors of the time, such as Bernadine Morris (New York Times), Sally Kirkland (Life Magazine), Eugenia Sheppard (International Herald Tribune, Los Angeles Times) and many others.

Most recently, he was particularly active in the interior and exterior design and refurbishment of hotels, luxury housing estates, and public transport vehicles.

=== In detail ===
==== 1950s and 1960s ====
At the age of 15 Yannis Tseklenis started working at his father's textile-couture retail business, where he gained valuable experience while also exploring his abilities in painting and design.

At age 24 he established his own advertising agency, Spectra Advertising, and undertook the publicity campaigns of major international and Greek companies such as Metaxa, General Motors, and Aegean Mills.

In 1962 and 1964 respectively, Tseklenis was directly involved in the interior decoration and design relating to the official celebrations of the weddings of princess Sofia of Greece to Juan Carlos of Spain, and of Anne-Marie of Denmark to the then King Constantine II of Greece. In 1963 he exhibited his paintings and drawings at the then well-known Athenian gallery Architektoniki (ΑΡΧΙΤΕΚΤΟΝΙΚΗ).

In 1965, aged 28, he took over his father's textile business and later that year, in collaboration with the Greek fashion designer Dimis Kritsas, presented his textile designs on fabrics used by Kritsas for his garments. The show was a huge success in Athens and New York. The entire collection, including 5,000 metres of his fabrics, was purchased by Elizabeth Arden Couture of New York.

In 1966 he proceeded with the licensing of his prints to the US firm Puritan Fashions Corporation. Bernadine Morris wrote in The New York Times that "...many of the clothes achieve their distinction from Mr. Tseklenis' prints, which look like modern abstractions but are derived from such ancient sources as a Minoan octopus and a Corinthian vase..." This motivated him to set up his own fashion business. By 1967 he already had a chain of fashion boutiques in Greece and by 1968 a small garment manufacturing business in Athens. He then licensed his designs to Berketex in the UK, American Celanese employed him to design for 10 knitting manufacturers in Germany, and in 1969 he licensed designs to David Crystal Inc. in the US. That year he was the first Greek fashion designer to design a collection of menswear in Greece, to be primarily included in his Tseklenis boutiques and he licensed his hosiery designs to Berkshire Hellas.

==== 1970s and 1980s ====
During the 1970s Tseklenis became the force behind the organisation of the first fashion collections in Greece, also using his international influence to promote Greek designers abroad. In 1970 he licensed his ladies' dresses to Frank Usher (UK) and to Madison S.A (Greece), while in 1971 he opened Tseklenis Boutiques in Beirut, Kuwait and Riyadh, as well as showrooms in Osaka (Japan) via the firm Misaki Sojhi. Later that same year he was commissioned by Aristotle Onassis to design the air-hostess uniforms for his airline Olympic Airways.

In the meantime he launched his first collection of furnishing fabrics in Athens, Paris and London. By 1973 Tseklenis had permanent showrooms in London and New York, thus supplying most of the top UK and US fashion stores of the time. By 1976 there were nine Tseklenis Fashion Boutiques in Greece, including in Athens, Mykonos, Hydra and Crete, while he also ran boutique shops on cruise ships and at the Caravel Hotel in Athens.

1977 proved to be a turning point for Tseklenis, both professionally and personally. While suffering an aggressive form of melanoma, he was admitted to the Memorial Hospital in New York, where doctors amputated his left arm to prevent the spread of cancer. Despite this traumatic and life-changing event he moved from Athens to New York, along with his entire business, where he signed up with the International Management Group, who then represented him internationally in the licensing of his fabrics, childrenswear and sportswear.

A year later, in 1979, the Metropolitan Museum of Art acquired the Tseklenis fashion films for their film library.

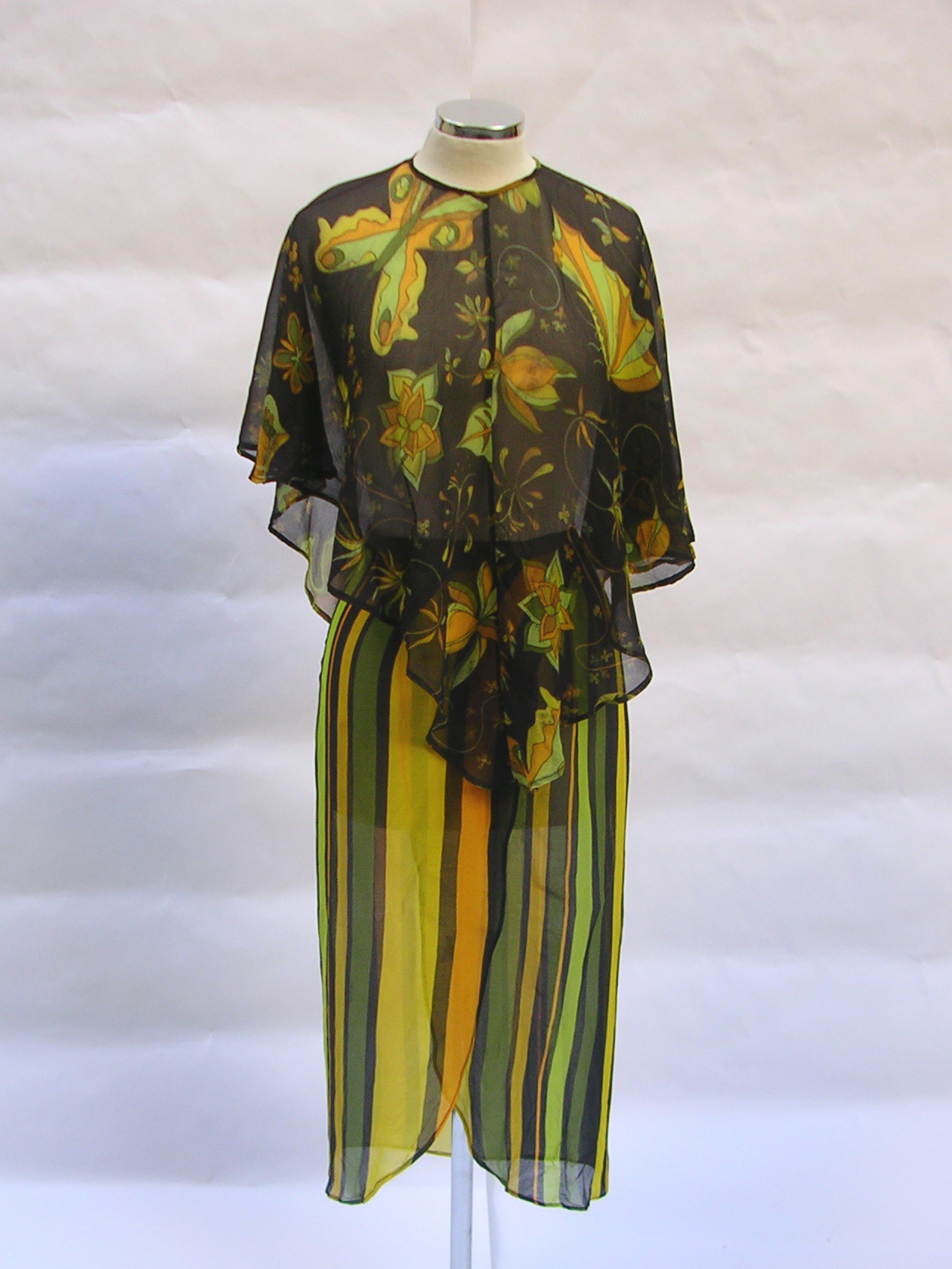
“Insects” by Tseklenis, 1972 (PFF collection)

In the meantime, the absence of the Tseklenis firm from Greece became a socio-economic issue for the country. The government therefore offered him favourable terms to return his business to Greece, which he did. He thus established Tseklenis International Fashion Enterprises (ladieswear, menswear, accessories, bodywear, action-sportwear and linens) based in Athens, in collaboration with Minion department stores. Seven boutiques were opened within these stores, and he aimed to start a franchise throughout the country. Unfortunately these plans were abandoned the following year, after the flagship department store burned down due to an arson attack.

The Hellenic Ministry of Industry commissioned him to organize and head for two years the Hellenic Design Centre, an institution offering designs by Greek designers to the country's manufacturers, thus encouraging Greek talent. According to Tseklenis, though, the relationship between design and industry in Greece is a loveless one, due to ignorance of branding.

Also in 1979 the automobile company Fiat assigned him to design the interiors and a facelift of the FIAT 126 personal car.

In 1980 Tseklenis opened a new showroom on New York's Fifth Avenue. The decade found him expanding his business even further and entering into activities such as interior design, bed linen, homewares (ceramics, tableware, candlesticks, etc.), and artistic direction of films.

==== 1990s to present ====
During the 1990s Tseklenis became almost totally active in the interior and environmental design business.

In 1997 he donated almost all his prototype garments from his 1970s and 1980s fashion collections to the Peloponnesian Folklore Foundation.

The following year he was commissioned to design the exteriors and interiors of Athens' public transport system (i.e. buses, trolleys) and in 1999 designed the then new suburban trains for the Hellenic Railways Organization (OSE).

Since 2000, he has been responsible for the holistic interior design of many luxury hotels, resorts and private villas across Greece. Examples of his work include Vedema (one of the first luxury boutique hotels in Greece), Zannos Melathron, Kastelli Resort Santorini, La Maltese Restaurant in Santorini, The Danai Beach Resort & Villas, and several luxury private villas in Athenian suburbs and the islands of Santorini and Mykonos, including the distinguished work on the Kelia vacation housing settlements on the island of Tinos.

== Awards ==
Tseklenis' artistic contribution to Greece has been awarded with various distinctions. He has received the Silver Cross of the Order of Phoenix from the Greek State, the Gold Medal of Fashion from the Hellenic Institute of Fashion, the Maiden of Cyclades by the Hellenic Fashion Centre and the Diolkos Prize of the Hellenic Marketing Academy.

== Exhibitions ==
- "Yannis Tseklenis: A Greek Fashion Designer", 1999, Thesion Theatre, Athens Greece.
- "6 'Universal' Greek Fashion Designers- 4th Greek Fashion Week", 2006, Zappeion, Athens Greece.
- "6 'Universal' Greek Fashion Designers" 2006, Leventis Municipal Museum of Nicosia, Nicosia Cyprus.
- "Endyesthai (To dress). Towards a Costume Culture Museum", 2010, Benaki Museum (Pireos annex), Athens Greece.
- "Six Universal Greek Fashion Designers from the collection of the Peloponnesian Folklore Foundation and Three Contemporary Greek Designers", 12.3-223.2012, Hellenic Centre, London UK.
- "A Tseklenis Tribute: The 70s Drawings Revisited", 1–29 April 2017, i-D Concept Stores, Athens Greece.

== Bibliography ==
- Evangelia Georgitsoyanni & Sofia Pantouvaki, “Culture and Fashion: Greek Designer Yannis Tseklenis, a Case Study”, in De Witt- Paul Al. & Crouch M. (ed.), Fashion Forward, Interdisciplinary Press, Oxford, United Kingdom 2011, ISBN 978-1-84888-001-6 pp. 153–164
- Eleanor Lambert, "World of Fashion: People, Places, Resources", R. R. Bowker Company, New York 1976, ISBN 978-0-83521-159-8, pp. 176
- William McWhirter, "What's a Nice Girl Like This Doing in a Myth Like Greece?", LIFE Magazine, vol.67 No 4, July 25, 1969
- Nolly Moyssi, “The contribution of Yannis Tseklenis to the world of fashion: a study of the historical and artistic value of his costume collection” doctoral thesis, University of Cyprus: Faculty of Letters - Department of History and Archaeology, Nicosia 2014
- Evangelia Patsi, “Aesthetic trends, social environment and fashion in Greece at the end of the 20th century: Yannis Tseklenis creates inspired from art” doctoral thesis, Aristotle University of Thessaloniki: Faculty of Fine Arts- School of Visual and Applied Arts, Thessaloniki 2013
- O. E. Schoeffler & William Gale, “Esquire’s Encyclopaedia of 20th Century Men’s Fashions” McGraw-Hill (ed.), New York 1973, ISBN 978-0070554801, pp. 366,639
- Sandy Tsantaki, “Tseklenis Scrapbook”, Peloponnesian Folklore Foundation, Nafplion, 1999.
- Artemis Yagou, “Fragile Innovation: Episodes in Greek Design History” CreateSpace Independent Publishing Platform, 2011, ISBN 978-1463516390
