= Kenneth Hudson =

Kenneth Hudson OBE FSA
- Born: 4 July 1916; Harlesden, London
- Died: 28 December 1999 (aged 83)
- Occupation: Journalist
- Years active: 20th century
- Known for: Founding the European Museum of the Year Award
- Board member of: Journal of Industrial Archaeology

Academic background
- Education: Lower School of John Lyon
- Alma mater: University College London

Academic work
- Discipline: Archaeology
- Sub-discipline: Industrial archaeology
- Institutions: University of Bristol; Bristol College of Science and Technology
- Main interests: Museology
- Notable works: Industrial archaeology
- Influenced: Sven Lindqvist
- Presenting career
- Network: BBC

Kenneth Hudson OBE FSA (4 July 1916 – 28 December 1999) was a journalist, museologist, broadcaster and book author.

== Early career ==
He was born in Harlesden and educated at the Lower School of John Lyon (now The John Lyon School) in Harrow and at University College London. In the Second World War he registered as a conscientious objector, serving in the Friends' Ambulance Unit. After the Second World War he worked in Germany in the Entnazifizierung campaign.

He became a lecturer in adult education at the University of Bristol in 1947, moving to the BBC in Bristol in 1954 as a radio talks producer and industrial correspondent. In 1966 he joined the staff of Bristol College of Science and Technology, which later became the University of Bath, to set up an educational television service.

== Later career ==
As a journalist and museologist, he was a controversial character of the European museum scene, a broadcaster and the author of numerous books. In 1963 he wrote one of the first books on the subject, Industrial Archaeology: An Introduction, and in 1965 his Industrial Archaeology of Southern England. He was the first editor of the Journal of Industrial Archaeology in which, with others, he produced an annual review of the rapidly growing literature. In 1972 he published his book on Building Materials in the Longmans IA series, and in 1979 he co-wrote, with Julian Pettifer, Diamonds in the Sky, the result of historical research on the social history of air travel for the BBC television series of the same name.

The latter part of his career was largely devoted to work on the public level of museums, producing gazetteers such as the classic Cambridge Guide to Museums of Britain and Ireland (1987) on which he collaborated with Ann Nicholls.

Together with John Letts he founded the European Museum of the Year Award in 1977, later to become the European Museum Forum, aimed at stimulating the international interchange of ideas and creating networks of inspiration.

== The Hudson Gallery, Museum of Bath at Work (UK) ==
The Hudson Gallery at the Museum of Bath at Work was opened on 4 July 2007. Part of the exhibition is the result of contact with ten historical societies which each submitted four images and 100 words of text they felt best described their area. Other exhibits include the cabinet-making industry in the city and local inventors. Kenneth Hudson was one of the original trustees of the museum.

== Books ==
- English Letter Writers Exeter: Wheaton and Co. (1951)
- Shakespeare and the Classroom with a foreword by Bernard Miles. Heinemann (1954)
- Industrial Archaeology: an Introduction John Baker (revised and reprinted 1966)
- The Industrial Archaeology of Southern England Newton Abbot: David & Charles (revised and reprinted 1968)
- An Awkward Size for a Town: Study of Swindon at the 100,000 Mark Newton Abbot: David & Charles (1967) hardcover, 212 pages ISBN 0-7153-4110-3, ISBN 978-0-7153-4110-0
- A Handbook for Industrial Archaeologists John Baker (1967)
- Towards Precision Shoemaking Newton Abbot: David & Charles (1968)
- Men and Women: Feminism and Anti-Feminism Today Newton Abbot: David & Charles (1968) hardcover, 212 pages
- The History of English China Clays – Fifty Years of Pioneering and Growth Newton Abbot: David & Charles (1969) hardcover, 192 pages ISBN 0-7153-4655-5, ISBN 978-0-7153-4655-6
- Industrial Archaeologist's Guide 1969–70 (with Neil Cossons) Newton Abbot: David & Charles (1969), new edition 1971
- Working to Rule Bath: Adams and Dart (1970)
- The Place of Women in Society Ginn (1971)
- The Fashionable Stone Bath: Adams and Dart (1971)
- A Guide to the Industrial Archaeology of Europe Bath: Adams and Dart (1971)
- Towards a Welfare State Ginn (1971)
- Building Materials Longman (1972)
- Air Travel: a Social History Bath: Adams and Dart (1972)
- Patriotism with Profit: British Agricultural Societies in the 18th and 19th centuries Hugh Evelyn (1972)
- The Directory of Museums (with Ann Nicholls) 1st edition, Macmillan (1975)
- ’Exploring our Industrial Past Hodder and Stoughton (1975)
- A Social History of Museums Macmillan (1975)
- The Industrial History of Europe Japanese edition, Tokyo (1975)
- The Bath and West Bath: Adams and Dart (1976)
- The Archaeology of Industry, drawings by Pippa Brand, The Bodley Head (1976)
- A Pocket Book for Industrial Archaeologists John Baker (1976)
- The Businessman in Public Associated Business Programmes (1976)
- People and Pleasures of Bath, Folio Miniatures series, Michael Joseph (1977)
- The Dictionary of Diseased English Macmillan (1977)
- The End of Gin and Tonic Man: a Future for Public Relations Wilton House Publications (1977)
- Museums for the 1980s: a Survey of World Trends Macmillan/UNESCO (1977)
- Exploring Cathedrals Hodder and Stoughton (1978)
- Food, Clothes and Shelter John Baker (1978)
- The Jargon of the Professions Macmillan (1978)
- The Language of Modern Politics Macmillan, reprinted Papermac (1978)
- Street Furniture The Bodley Head (1979)
- Tragedy on the High Seas: a History of Shipwrecks (with Ann Nicholls) New York: A and W Publishers (1979)
- A History of Shipwrecks (with Ann Nicholls) Macmillan (1979)
- World Industrial Archaeology Cambridge University Press (1979)
- Archeologia dell’Industria Translated by Bruno Granada from The Archaeology of Industry Rome: Newton Compton (1979)
- Diamonds in the Sky: a Social History of Air Travel (with Julian Pettifer) The Bodley Head for the BBC (1979)
- Where We Used to Work John Baker (1980)
- The Good Museums Guide Macmillan (1980), revised and reprinted 1982
- The Shell Guide to Country Museums Heinemann (1980)
- Farm Furniture The Bodley Head (1982)
- Waterside Furniture The Bodley Head (1982)
- Behind the High Street The Bodley Head (1982)
- Pawnbroking: an Aspect of British Social History The Bodley Head (1982)
- Help the Aged: Twenty-One Years of Experiment and Achievement The Bodley Head (1982)
- The Language of the Teenage Revolution Macmillan (1983)
- The Dictionary of the Teenage Revolution and its Aftermath Macmillan (1983)
- The Dictionary of Even More Diseased English Macmillan (1983)
- Industrial History from the Air Cambridge University Press (1983)
- Clues to Yesterday’s Transport The Bodley Head (1984)
- Churchyards and Graveyards The Bodley Head Children's Books (1984) hardcover 48 pages ISBN 0-370-30543-4, ISBN 978-0-370-30543-1
- The Directory of Museums and Living Displays (with Ann Nicholls) 3rd Edition, Macmillan (1985)
- Museums of Influence Cambridge University Press (1987)
- The Cambridge Guide to the Museums of Britain and Ireland (with Ann Nicholls) Cambridge University Press (1987), revised paperback edition (1989)
- The Cambridge Guide to the Historic Places of Britain and Ireland (with Ann Nicholls) Cambridge University Press (1989)
- 1992: Prayer or Promise? The opportunities for Britain's museums and the people who work in them HMSO for the Museums and Galleries Commission (1990)
- The Cambridge Guide to the Museums of Europe (with Ann Nicholls) Cambridge University Press (1991)
- Museums: Treasures or Tools? Strasbourg: Council of Europe (1992)
- New Museums in Europe 1977–93 edited by Massimo Negri; text by Kenneth Hudson Milan: Mazzotta (1993)
