= Maecenas-Ehrung =

- Native name: Maecenas-Ehrung
- Description: Biennial distinction honoring significant private patronage and promotion of art and culture in Germany
- Country: Germany
- Presented by: Arbeitskreis selbständiger Kultur-Institute (AsKI)
- Website: https://www.aski.org/maecenas-ehrung.html, http://www.maecenas.de/

The Maecenas-Ehrung is a distinction awarded by the German Arbeitskreis selbständiger Kultur-Institute, AsKI. (engl.: Association of Independent Cultural Institutions).

== Purpose and focus ==
The distinction is awarded biennially to personalities that have significantly promoted art and culture in Germany. An independent jury selects the laureates.

With the Maecenas distinction the AsKI honors privately financed promotion of culture. It is to communicate the results of and to encourage for new patronage. Part of the Maecenas-Ehrung is the presentation of a piece of art or adequate honorable gift, since 2003 a bronze sculpture of the artist Manfred Sihle-Wissel.

The AsKI has been founded in 1967 as an association of today 35 nationally and internationally renowned independent cultural and research institutions. With valuable collections they particularly represent the quality and variety of German culture.

== Laureates ==
- 2025 – Volker Kielstein
- 2024 – Irmgard und Robert Rademacher
- 2023 – Monika Schnetkamp
- 2022 – Nicola Leibinger-Kammüller
- 2021 – Anita und Günter Lichtenstein
- 2020 – Sabine Schubert
- 2019 – Christoph Müller
- 2018 – Monika Schoeller
- 2017 – Barbara Lambrecht-Schadeberg
- 2016 – Hermann-Hinrich Reemtsma
- 2015 – Ursula Haeusgen
- 2014 – Wilhelm Winterstein
- 2013 – Christian Dräger
- 2012 – Sylvia und Friedrich von Metzler
- 2011 – Karin und Uwe Hollweg
- 2010 – Anne-Sophie Mutter
- 2009 - Anette und Udo Brandhorst
- 2007 – Berthold Leibinger
- 2005 – Prince Michael von Sachsen-Weimar-Eisenach
- 2003 – Günter Braun and Waldtraut Braun
- 2001 – Udo van Meeteren
- 1999 – Clara Freifrau von Arnim and Wolf-Dietrich Speck von Sternburg
- 1997 – Paul Sacher
- 1995 – Henri Nannen
- 1993 – Marion Ermer
- 1991 – Alfred C. Toepfer
- 1989 – Arend Oetker

== See also ==
- List of awards for contributions to culture
- Gaius Maecenas, Roman advisor and eponym of the Maecenas distinction
