= Tomislav Šola =

Professor Tomislav Šola

Tomislav Sladojević Šola (born 1948) is a Croatian museologist.

== Early life and education ==
Tomislav Sladojević Šola was born in Zagreb, at that point part of Yugoslavia, in 1948. He graduated with a diploma in art history and English in the University of Zagreb from 1969 to 1974, then pursued a postgraduate study of journalism in the Faculty of Political Sciences, Zagreb, from 1975 to 1976 and a two-semester-course of contemporary museology at Sorbonne University in Paris from 1978 to 1979 and attained a PhD in museology from the University of Ljubljana in 1985.

== Career ==
Following a seven-year period of curatorships in Zagreb from 1975 to 1981 and another seven years as director of The Museum Documentation Centre from 1981 to 1987, Šola joined the University of Zagreb and was appointed assistant professor in the Faculty of Humanities and Social Sciences from 1987 to 2013, having retired with academic tenure.

He draws from his practical experience as a curator, director, editor, lecturer and consultant in his research.

Šola’s main research interests are in heritage and especially in examining its theoretical underpinnings, for which he coined the terms “Heritology“ (1982) and “Mnemosophy” (1987). Both describe the convergence of museum and heritage related occupations into one mega-profession based upon common science. The latter term as certain cybernetic philosophy of heritage, addresses public memory issues and institutions in a more accurate way. His broad lecturing and publishing activity covered many other themes. Most of his books and writings are freely accessible online.

Šola is the founder of The Best in Heritage, the world’s only annual survey of award-winning museum, heritage, and conservation projects in Dubrovnik.

== Bibliography ==
(listed in the original language of each communication)

Scientific monographs and books

- Antimuzej: bibliofilsko izdanje. Zagreb: Zbirka Biškupić, 1985.
- Role of museums in developing countries. Varanasi: Bharat Kala Bhavan Hindu University, 1989. p. 24.
- Essays On Museums And Their Theory: towards the cybernetic museum. Helsinki: Finnish Museums Association, 1997. p. 293.
- Marketing u muzejima ili o vrlini i kako je obznaniti. Zagreb: Hrvatsko muzejsko društvo, 2001. Str. 322.
- Marketing u muzejima ili o vrlini i kako je obznaniti. Beograd: Clio, 2002. Str. 380.
- Eseji o muzejima i njihovoj teoriji-prema kibernetičkom muzeju. Zagreb: Hrvatski nacionalni komitet ICOM, 2003. Str. 350.
- De la vanitat a la saviesa / From Vanity to Wisdom // Institu Catala de Recercs en Patrimoni Cultural, Girona, 2009, pp. 1–71.
- Prema totalnom muzeju. Beograd, 2011, Centar za muzeologiju i heritologiju
- Eternity does not live here any more - a glossary of museum sins, Zagreb, 2012.
- Вечность здесь больше не живет: толковый словарь музейных грехов. — Тула: Музей-усадьба Л.Н.Толстого «Ясная Поляна», 2013. – 356 с.
- Javno pamćenje, čuvanje različitosti i mogući projekti. Zavod za Informacijske znanosti. Filozofski fakultet, Zagreb, 2014.
- Šola, Tomislav S. Mnemosophy. Essay on the science of public memory. EUB, Zagreb, 2015. 320 p.
- Шола Т.С. Мнемософия. Эссе о науке публичной памяти. /Пер. с англ. Синицыной О.В./. Ростов Великий ИКОМ России; ГМЗ «Ростовский кремль» 2017г. 320 с.
- Public memory in a deluded society: Notes of a lecturer, ICOFOM/ICOM, 2022

Chapters in books

- The Museum Curator: endangered species. // Museums 2000 / ed. by Patrick Boylan. London : Association Routledge, 1990. pp. 152–164.
- Museums and Curatorship: the role of theory // The Museum Profession/ ed. by Gaynor Kavanagh. Leicester : Leicester University Press,1991. pp. 125–137.
- The European Dream and Reality of Museums: a report from South-East. // Museums and Europe 1992 / ed. by Susan Pearce. London : The Athlone Press, 1992. pp. 159–173.
- Museums, museology, and ethics: a changing paradigm// Museum Ethics/ ed. by Gary Edson. London: Routledge, 1997. pp. 168–175.
- The role of Museums in Sustaining Cultural Diversity // Cultural Traditions in Northern Ireland: cultural diversity in contemporary Europe./ ed. by Maurna Crozier and Richard Froggat. Belfast: The Institute of Irish Studies, 1997. pp. 107–113
- Redefining collecting // Museums and the future of Collecting (Second Edition) / ed. by Simon J. Knell. Ashgate Publishing Limited: Aldershot. 2004. pp. 250–260.
- The importance of being wise or could "Museum archaeology" help us be better professionals // Archeologia del museo / Lenzi, Fiamma; Zifferero, Andrea (ed.). Bologna : Editrice Compositori, 2004. pp. 11–16.
- Baština kao poziv i društveno opredjeljenje // Ivi Maroeviću baštinici u spomen / Vujić, Žarka; Špikić, Marko (ed.), Zagreb : Zavod za informacijske studije Odsjeka za informacijske znanosti Filozofskog fakulteta Sveučilišta u Zagrebu, 2009. Str. 111-138.
- Towards the Total Museum/ Museums in a Digital Age / Parry, Ross (ed.)London : Routledge, 2009. pp. 421–426.
- The Museum Definition: Questioning the Scope and Motives // What is a museum? / Davis, A; Mairesse, F; Desvallees, A. (ed.). Muenchen : Verlag Dr. C.Mueller-Straten, 2010. pp. 106–112.
- European Collection Resources - museums serving European identity // Encouraging Collections Mobility - A way forward for museums in Europe / Pettersson, Susanna (ur.) Helsinki, Finska : Finnish National Gallery, 2010. pp. 248–257.
- Virtues and Qualities - a contribution to professionalizing the heritage profession // The Best in Heritage / Šola, Tomislav (ed.) Zagreb : European Heritage Association, 2011. pp. 10–21.
- Uloga baštinskih institucija u građenju nacionalnog identiteta // Hrvatski identitet / Horvat, Romana (ed.). Zagreb : Matica hrvatska, 2011. Str. 255-285.
- The heritage product as suggested by a marketing approach // Sketches and essays to mark twenty years of the International Cultural Centre / Purchla, Jacek (ed.). Kraków : International Cultural Centre, 2011. pp. 460–470.
