= Future for Religious Heritage =

- Formation: 2011; 15 years ago
- Type: European network
- Location: Brussels
- Region served: Europe
- Members: 200
- President: Pilar Bahamonde
- Website: www.frh-europe.org

Future for Religious Heritage (FRH) is a non-religious, non-profit heritage organisation registered in Belgium, with members across Europe. Not to be confused with the Ferryhill Railway Heritage Trust (FRHT). FRH is a member of the European Heritage Alliance 3.3, an informal European sectoral platform. The organisation was a stakeholder of the European Year of Cultural Heritage 2018.

FRH is a "network of charities and conservation departments of governmental, religious and university institutions, and other professionals working to protect religious heritage buildings across Europe, with over 200 full and associate members in 39 countries."

== Purpose ==
"Begun as a grass-roots movement in 2009, the Future for Religious Heritage took shape in 2011 as a network of groups from more than 30 countries, dedicated to finding ways to keep churches, synagogues and other religious buildings open, if not for services, then for other uses." FRH has its headquarters in Brussels.

== Members ==
Its members include the National Museum of Denmark, Archbishopric of Prague, Chorus Venezia, Din l-Art Ħelwa, Museum Catharijneconvent, Department for Cultural Heritage Conservation of the Church of Sweden, Churches Conservation Trust, Diocese of London, English Heritage, Friends of Friendless Churches, The Historic Religious Buildings Alliance, Jewish Heritage UK, National Churches Trust, Scotland's Churches Trust, Culture Directorate of Government of Cantabria, Church Art Collection at the University Museum of Bergen, Diocese of Lugo, among many others.

== Activities ==
FRH bring the voice of the sector to the European Institutions, while also working with its members to facilitate the development of cross border projects.

These projects aim to fully exploit the potential of religious heritage in its various aspects:

- Cultural value

Sacred buildings, as their contents and their history represent a significant piece of Europe's historic patrimony.

- Social potential

Religious buildings bind communities together through the worship and non-worship activities that take place within them. They are often the only public buildings remaining.

- Economic potential

Places of worship attract visitors from afar and from nearby. Religious buildings represent five out of ten of Europe's most visited sites and make a major contribution to tourism GDP.

- Environmental potential

Their physical presence marks the cityscape or rural environment.

FRH works with partners across Europe to protect and promote cultural and religious heritage. These include:

- Sanctuary - European Religious Heritage Database
- Balancing Faith and Heritage: The Question of Entrance Fees in European Cathedrals
- FRH Talks – New Horizons for Religious Heritage Preservation in the Digital Age
- POLYVERSE – Promoting intercultural dialogue through music
- MIRETAGE – European Pathways to Minority Religious Heritage
- FRH Masterclass – "Staging religion in museums: the 'performance' of religion(s) as a challenge for museums"
