= Museum Walserhaus =

Museum Walserhaus Gurin
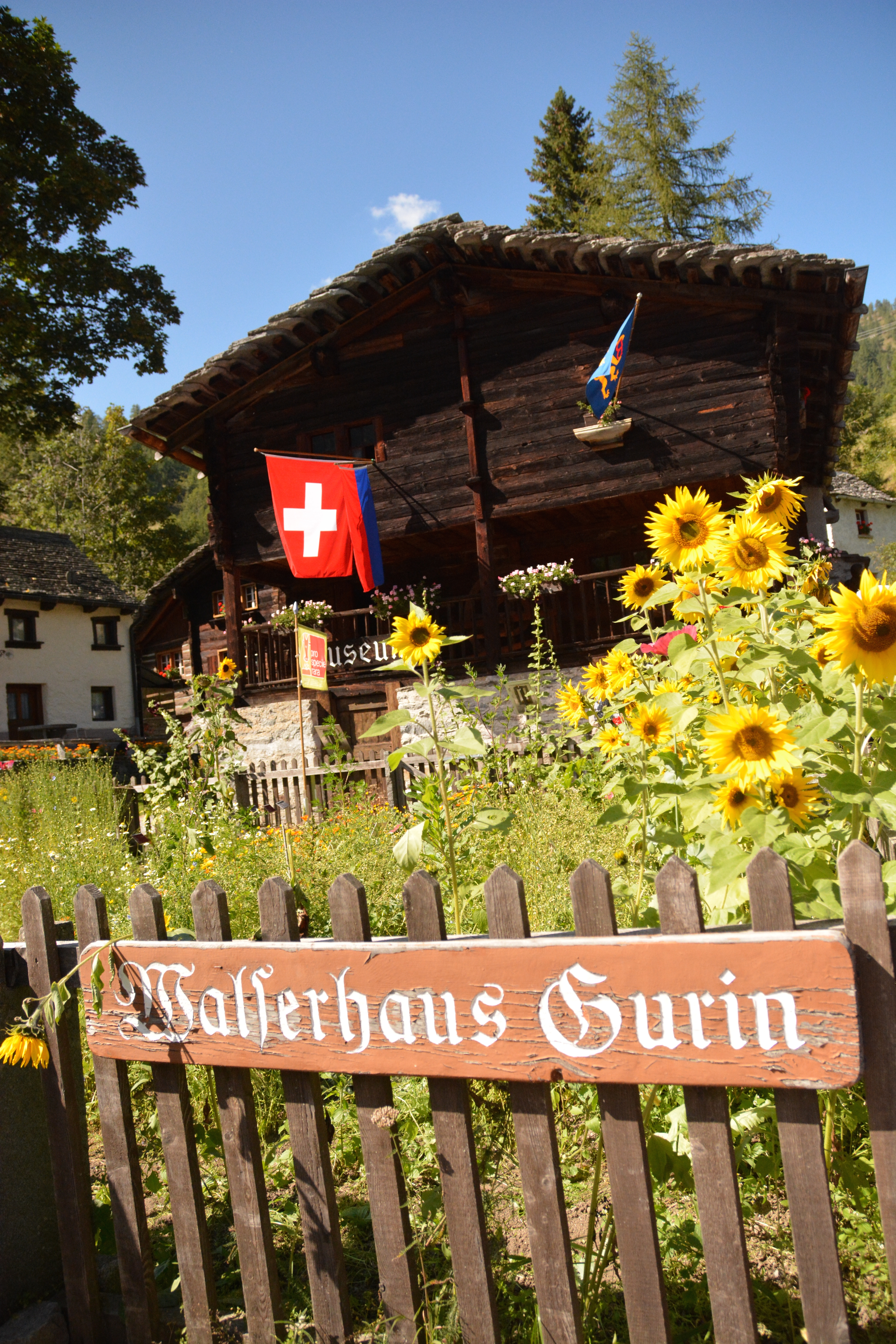
- Location: Bosco/Gurin, Switzerland
- Coordinates: 46.317181°N 8.489971°E
- Type: Ethnographic museum

The Museum Walserhaus Gurin is located in the characteristic Walser village of Bosco/Gurin and is the oldest ethnographic museum in the Canton of Ticino. It is managed by the Walserhaus Gurin Association.

== The Walserhaus Gurin Association ==
The Association founded in 1936 intends to maintain and upgrade the Walser culture and language of Bosco/Gurin, the so-called Ggurijnartitsch. In particular, the Association intends to:

- protect the historical, cultural and linguistic heritage of the Gurin Walser community;
- support and encourage projects aiming to deepen knowledge and understanding of Gurin Walser origins, history, language and customs among the local community and further afield;
- present in the ethnographic Museum Walserhaus the history and culture of the Gurin Walser community and of the neighbouring Pomatt Valley Val Formazza.

The Association counts more than 300 members and is ruled by a Committee where the local authorities and bodies are represented. The execution of the museum’s activities is carried out by a curator helped by a guardian; both live in the village and are supported by numerous volunteers. The habitation museum is unique and not only attracts many visitors (more than 3'000 every year) from all over Switzerland and from abroad, but also has the function of enhancing the Gurin community’s sense of cohesion through a host of activities and of maintaining the links to other Walser communities all over the Alps.

== History ==
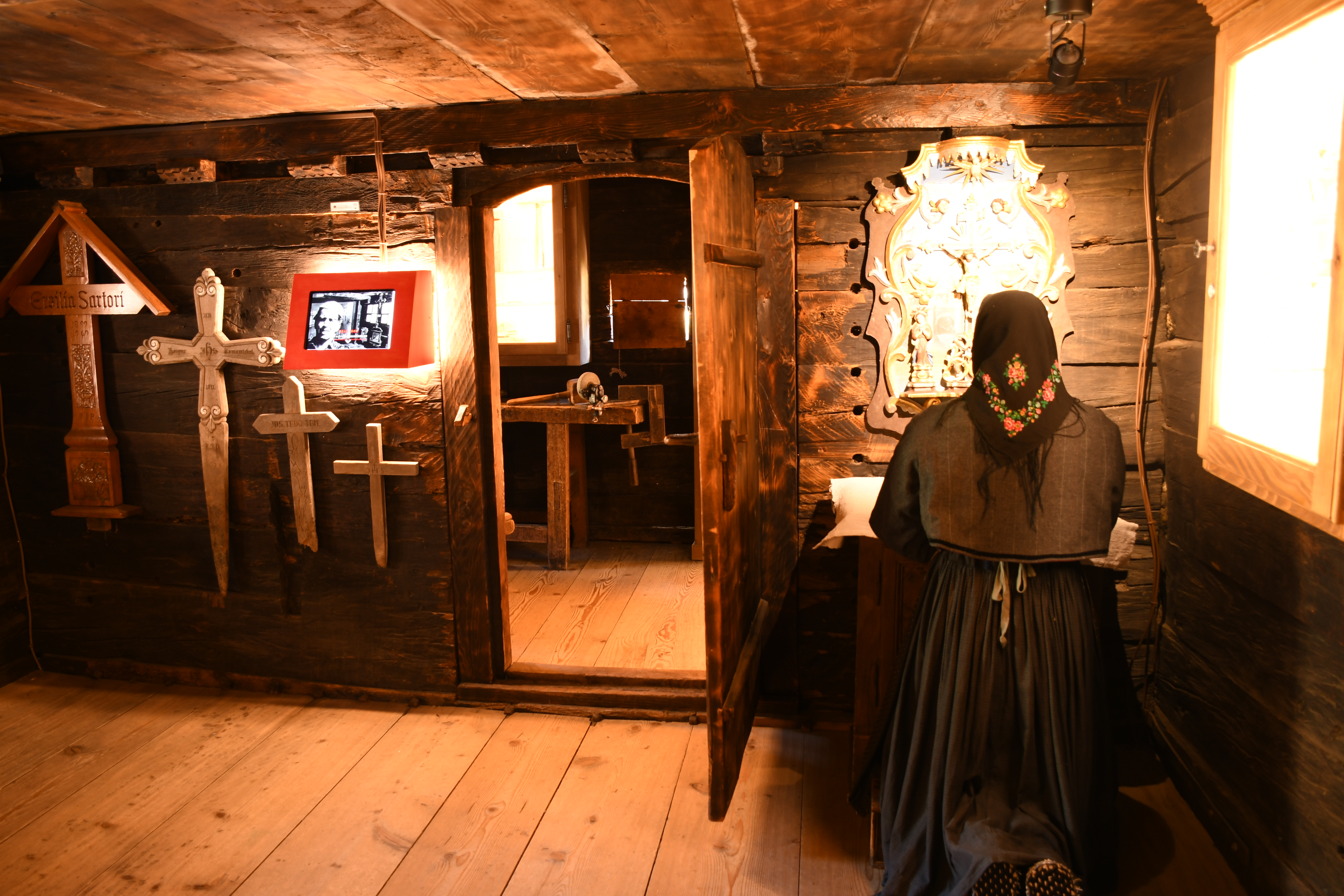
Permanent exhibition in the habitation museum after renovation works in 2018 and the installation of Info-boxes.

The Museum Walserhaus was opened in 1938 as the first ethnographic museum in the canton Ticino. For this purpose, a very old house from 1386 was made available and could therefore be preserved in its original structure. From the beginning, the exhibition grew steadily. In 2006 the permanent exhibition was completely reorganized. Since then, the exhibition concept has expanded to include the nearby barn and the vegetable garden in front of the museum. Since 2009, the museum received another barn in which there is space for temporary exhibitions or handicraft workshops. In 2016, a project was launched to update and modernize the exhibition with a particular focus on upgrading the architectural heritage, the collection and the Ggurijnartitsch through an innovative method of presentation. Thanks to the project, the jobs of the curator and The Guardian were preserved and work opportunities were offered to the residents and craftsmen of the village. The current exhibition, inaugurated in 2018, can now be seen in its modern form with updated technical infrastructure. In 2020 the Museum Walserhaus was nominated for the European Museum of the Year Award (EMYA).; in 2021 it won the Meyvaert Award for Sustainability that goes to a museum which demonstrates an exceptional commitment to social, economic and environmental sustainability in how it operates and/or how it presents issues of sustainability in its displays and programmes.

== The Habitation Museum ==
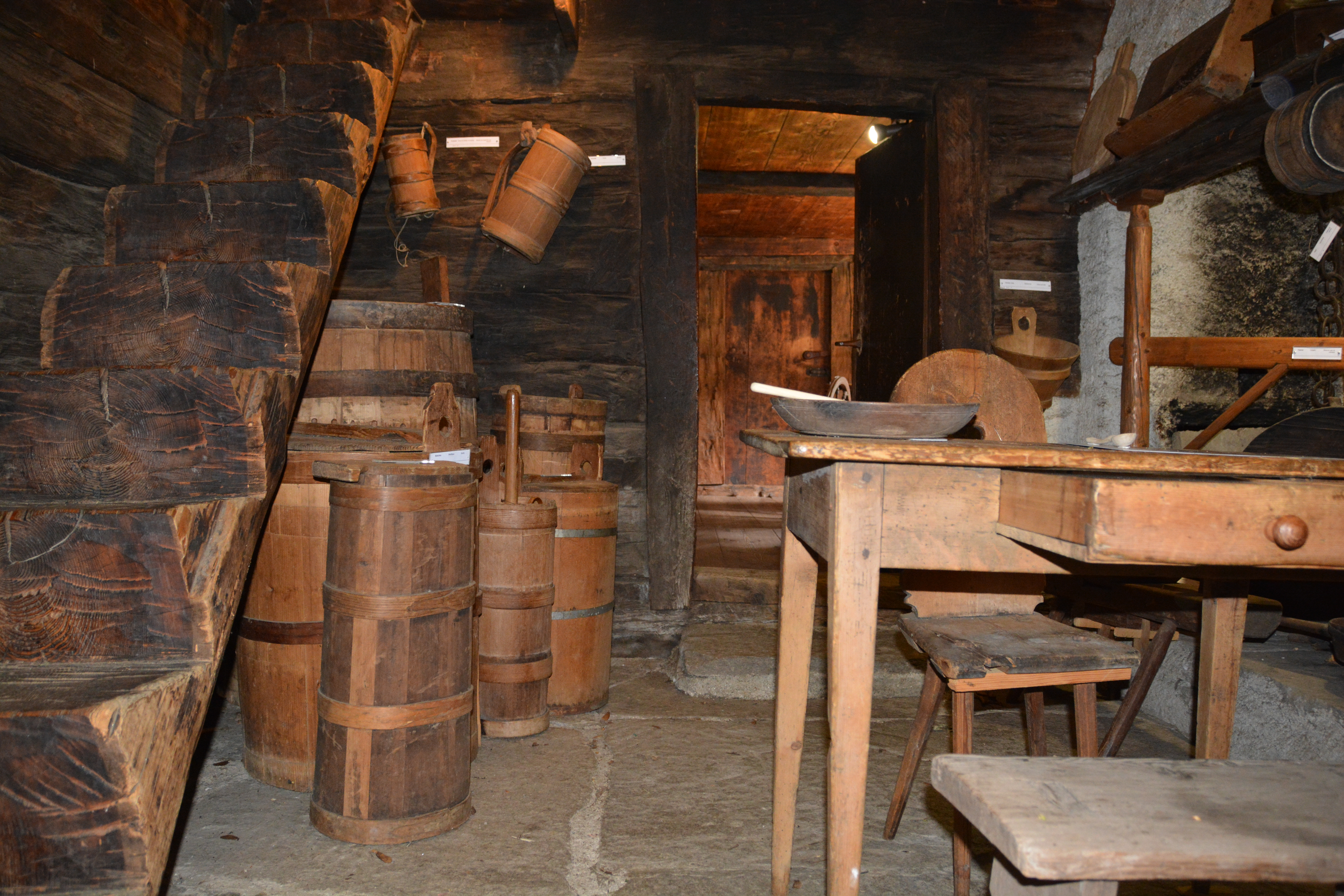
Permanent exhibition in the house before the reorganisation project of 2018 was carried out.

The permanent exhibition is set up in an old Walser house in which various folkloristic and historical topics are presented. The house was originally intended for two families. The building dated 1386 is one of the oldest buildings in the entire Alpine region and is in itself a gem of Walser architecture. One room is dedicated to the Gurin artist and graphic artist Hans Tomamichel (1899 – 1984) who is known for his sgraffitis created throughout Switzerland (20 of which are in Bosco/Gurin) and for the important advertising campaigns created for Knorr, Nestlé and Caritas. Hans Tomamichel was also one of the co-founders of the Walserhaus Association and active in making the Walser culture known as a whole.

In the two nearby barns there are a permanent exhibition on mountain farming and temporary exhibitions ond topics inherent to the village, whereas in front of the museum there is the show garden built in collaboration with the ProSpecieRara Foundation.

== The Museum in the Territory ==
The new concept elaborated in 2016 wants to expand the museum into the Gurin territory. For this purpose, the project Ggurijnar Cheschtschi (Gurin treasure chest) was developed: a collection of didactic activities and guided tours described in a series of brochures that allow to make tangible themes around the traditions, the language, the art and the environment. The borchures are available to visitors at the reception so that they can explore the village and learn some interesting facts about it. The project Ggurijnar Cheschtschi was supported by Pro Patria and by the Bosco/Gurin Association for the landscape.

== Projects ==
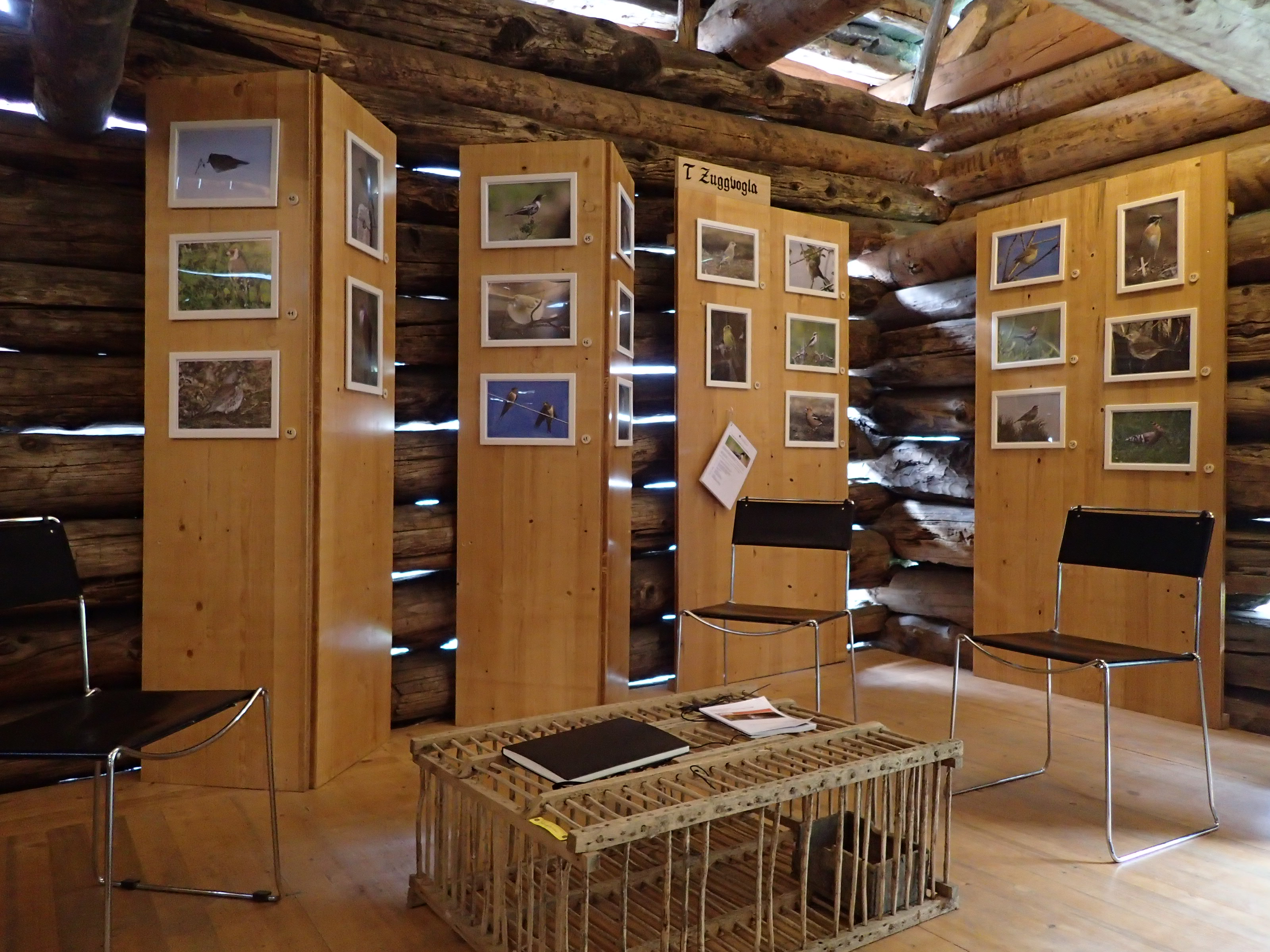
Temporary exhibition Ggurijnar Vegalti (Gurin birds).

The Walserhaus Gurin museum is recognized by the Canton of Ticino as a regional ethnographic museum (Law on regional ethnographic museums – 1990.06.18 and chg. 2002.06.04) and is an active member of the International Association for Walserism (IVfW). Hereafter some of the projects implemented in the past decade are presented:

- 2008: for the 70th anniversary, an old lime kiln was put into operation again in cooperation with the Bosco/Gurin Landscape Association. The produced lime was used for the restoration of an old residential building of particular historical value.
- 2012: For the exhibition "The world of the Weltu" the two artists Elisabeth Flueler-Tomamichel and Kurt Hutterli were inspired by the local legends and mythologic figures.
- 2014: The publication of the vocabulary Aus der Mundart von Bosco/Gurin – Wörterbuch der Substantive started by Dr. phil. Emily Gerstner-Hirzel (1923 – 2003) and completed by the museum, offers a broad basis for the enhancement of various aspects of Walser culture.
- 2014-2019: Different temporary exhibitions: Ggurijnar Chåårta (Bosco/Gurin on postcards), Ggurijnar Bliama (Gurin flowers), Ggurijnar Vegalti(Gurin birds), Ggurijnar Schètz (Gurin jewellery).
- Work in progress: linguistic research in view of the publication of the second volume of the vocabulary Aus der Mundart von Bosco/Gurin – Wörterbuch der Verben und anderen Wortarten, carry on the project for preservation of Ggurijnartitsch which is sustained by Zurich University and Schweizerisches Idiotikon.
- Work in progress: The project Ggurijnar Schtåmmbömm - Genealogy of Bosco Gurin – will allow to have the complete genealogy of all local historical families from 1600.

== Bibliography ==
- Tobias Tomamichel, Bosco/Gurin Das Walserdorf im Tessin, Schweizerische Gesellschaft für Volkskunde, 1997
- Annegreth Diethelm,Hans Anton Tomamichel. 1899–1984. Mit Bildern schreiben. Associazione Walserhaus Gurin, Offizin, Zürich, 2001 (ISBN 3-907496-12-4)
- Enrico Rizzi, Leonhard Tomamichel, Giorgio Filippini, Geschichte von Bosco/Gurin, Associazione Walserhaus Gurin, Fondazione Enrico Monti, Anzola d'Ossola, 2009 (ISBN 88-85295-54-1)
- Emily Gerstner-Hirzel, Aus der Mundart von Bosco/Gurin, Wörterbuch der Substantive von Bosco/Gurin, Associazione Walserhaus Gurin, Armando Dadò Editore, 2014(ISBN 88-82813-91-6)
