= European Heritage Alliance 3.3 =

The European Heritage Alliance 3.3, an informal European sectoral platform composed of 30 European or international networks and organisations active in the wider field of cultural heritage, was launched in June 2011 on the occasion of the European Heritage Congress 2011 organised by Europa Nostra in Amsterdam.

On this occasion, Europe's major heritage networks agreed to work more closely together to promote the untapped potential of Europe's heritage, cultural and natural, immovable and movable. The alliance founding members bring together Europe's civil society organisations, historic cities and villages, museums, heritage professionals and volunteers, (private) owners of collections of artefacts, historic buildings and cultural landscapes, educators, town planners, etc. The "European Heritage Alliance 3.3" thus represents a very large constituency composed of tens of millions of Europe's citizens. Europa Nostra is acting as facilitator of the alliance.

The name of this alliance refers to the article 3.3. of the consolidated version of the Lisbon Treaty of the European Union which stipulates that "[The Union] shall respect its rich cultural and linguistic diversity, and shall ensure that Europe's cultural heritage is safeguarded and enhanced."

It contributed to the preparation of the European Commission communication "Towards an integrated approach to cultural heritage for Europe" published in July 2014.

== Members ==
The members of the European Heritage Alliance 3.3 are:

1. ACCR (Association des Centres Culturels de Rencontres)
2. AEERPA (European Association of Architectural Heritage Restoration Companies)
3. ANCBS (Association of National Committees of the Blue Shield)
4. CIVILSCAPE (CIVILSCAPE – we are the landscape people!)
5. E.C.C.O. (European Confederation of Conservator-Restorers' Organisations)
6. ECF (European Cultural Foundation)
7. ECOVAST (European Council for the Village and Small Town)
8. ECTN (European Cultural Tourism Network)
9. ECTP-CEU (European Council of Spatial Planners)
10. E-FAITH (European Federation of Associations of Industrial and Technical Heritage)
11. EHHA (European Historic Houses Association)
12. ELO (European Landowners’ Organisation)
13. EMA (European Museum Academy)
14. EMF (European Museum Forum)
15. EMH (European Maritime Heritage)
16. ENCATC (European network on cultural management and policy)
17. ENCoRE (European Network for Conservation-Restoration Education)
18. ERIH (European Route of Industrial Heritage)
19. EUROCLIO (European Association of History Educators)
20. EUROCITIES (The Network of Major European Cities)
21. Europa Nostra (The Voice of Cultural Heritage in Europe)
22. EWT (European Walled Towns)
23. FEDECRAIL (European Federation of Museum and Tourist Railways)
24. FRH (Future for Religious Heritage – European Network for historic places of worship)
25. Heritage Europe – EAHTR (European Association of Historic Towns and Regions)
26. ICOM (International Council of Museums)
27. ICOMOS (International Council on Monuments and Sites)
28. IFLA Europe (International Federation of Landscape Architects)
29. INTO (International National Trusts Organisation)
30. INTO Europe (International National Trusts Organisation)
31. ISOCARP (International Society of City and Regional Planners)
32. NEMO (Network of European Museum Organisations)
33. OWHC (Organisation of World Heritage Cities)
34. RANN (Réseau Art Nouveau Network)
35. SEE Heritage Network (South East European Heritage Network)
36. TICCIH Europe (The International Committee for the Conservation of the Industrial Heritage)
37. UIA workgroup Heritage Region 1 (International Union of Architects)
