= Museum of Contraception and Abortion =

Coordinates: 48.1949°N 16.3390°E

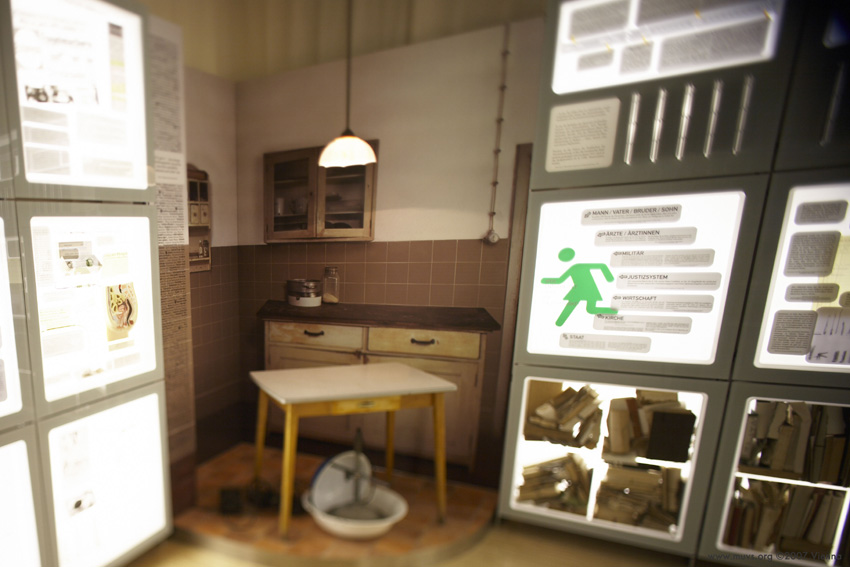
Exhibit from the museum showing the history and method of an illegal abortion

The Museum of Contraception and Abortion (German: Museum für Verhütung und Schwangerschaftsabbruch, MUVS) is a museum in Vienna, Austria, founded by gynaecologist Christian Fiala in 2003. It details historic forms of birth control and was created to encourage contraceptive use and family planning techniques.
