= Peloponnesian Folklore Foundation =

Ethnological and fashion museum in Greece

Basil Papantoniou Foundation
- Ίδρυμα Βασίλη Παπαντωνίου
- Established: 1974
- Location: V. Alexandrou Street, Nafplion, Greece
- Type: Ethnological and Fashion museum
- Founder: Ioanna Papantoniou
- Website: bpf.gr/en

The Basil Papantoniou Foundation or BPF (Greek: Ίδρυμα Βασίλη Παπαντωνίου, romanized: Ídryma Vasíli Papantoníou; also known as ΙΒΠ) is a nonprofit cultural institution and museum based in Nafplion, Greece. It was founded in 1974 by the stage and costume designer Ioanna Papantoniou in memory of her father Vasilis Papantoniou. The aim of the BPF is the research, documentation, study, preservation and dissemination of modern Greek and global culture in general, in all of its forms and expressions.

== History ==
BPF was founded in 1974 by Ioanna Papantoniou and it is located since 1981 in an early 20th century house belonging to Papantoniou family which was converted into a museum. The same year BPF was awarded with the European Museum of the Year Award (EMYA). During the 70's and the 80's, the foundation made several researches over Greece, Cyprus and the Griko communities of Southern Italy, gathering data and documents about the traditional culture, music and dance and also about the preindustrial technology and the old fashioned children toys. In 1989 BPF founded the first Childhood Museum in Greece, in Nafplion at the old local railway station. Four years later, Melina Merkouri (then Culture minister of Greece) assigned to BPF the Hellenic National Costume Archives while in 1999 the foundation's facilities were renovated. In 2013 BPF was awarded by the Academy of Athens for its cultural activities.

Artifacts of the foundation have been exposed in various exhibitions worldwide including Athens, Thessaloniki, Brussels, Dallas, Limassol, London etc. in cooperation with foundations and authorities such as Benaki Museum, Municipality of Nafplio, Nicosia Municipality, Harokopio University, Foundation of the Hellenic World, Hellenic Centre of London, Teloglion Foundation of Art etc.

== Collections ==
BPF collections include c. 50,000 items. The majority of them, more than 27,000 items, are directly connected to the popular and modern Greek culture including traditional costumes and items from mainland Greece, Crete, Aegean and Ionian Islands, Cyprus, Asia Minor, etc. The museum also holds a collection of 5,500 items linked with the history of fashion, including works by designers such as Christian Dior, Issey Miyake, Paco Rabanne, Christian Louboutin, Sue Wong, Mariano Fortuny, Laura Ashley, Jean Dessès, James Galanos, Yiannis Tseklenis etc. Peloponnesian Folklore Foundation also owns a photography, sound and film collection dedicated to its past researches, a library of 10,000 titles a publishing house.

== Gallery ==
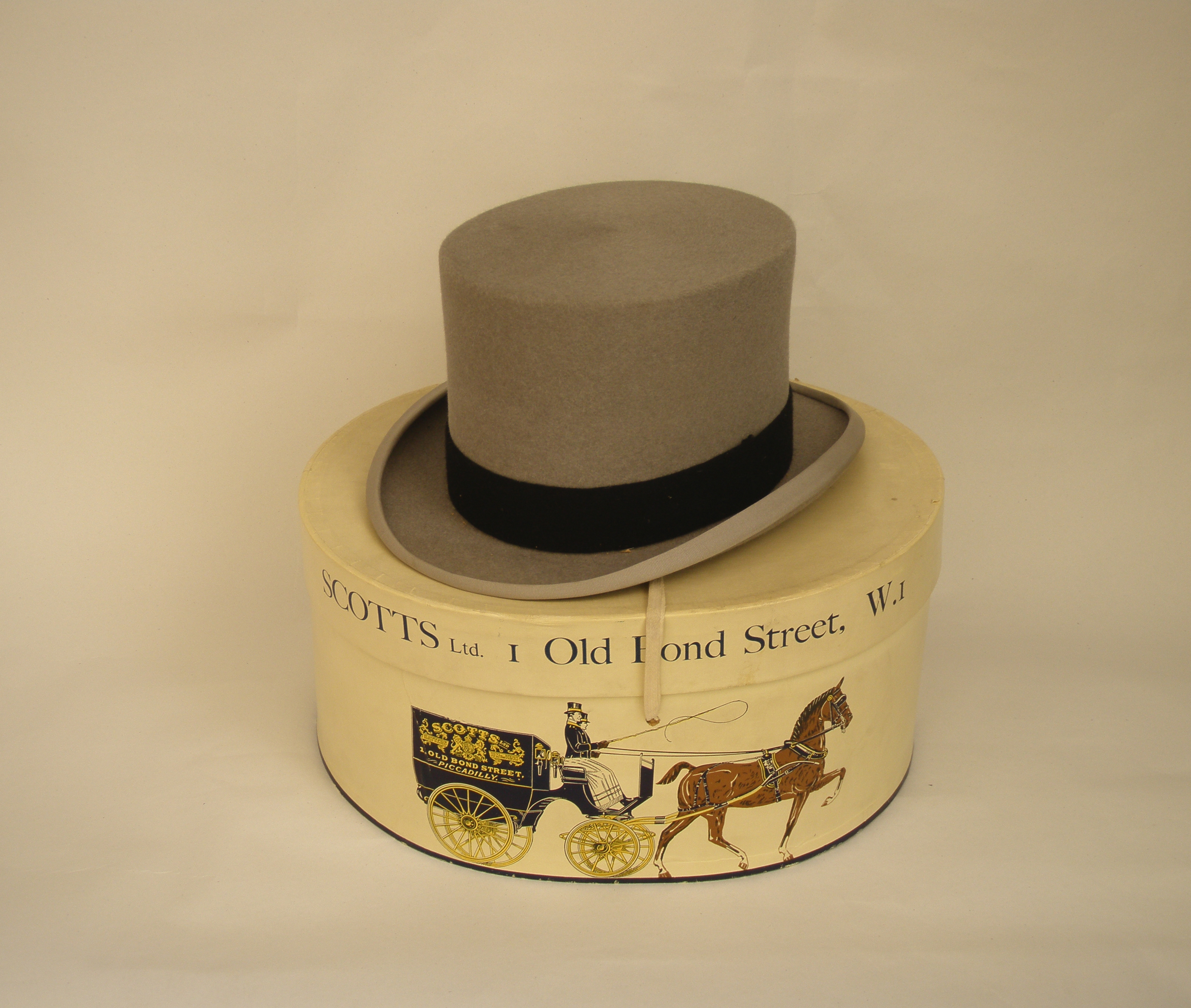
A top hat from the 1950s

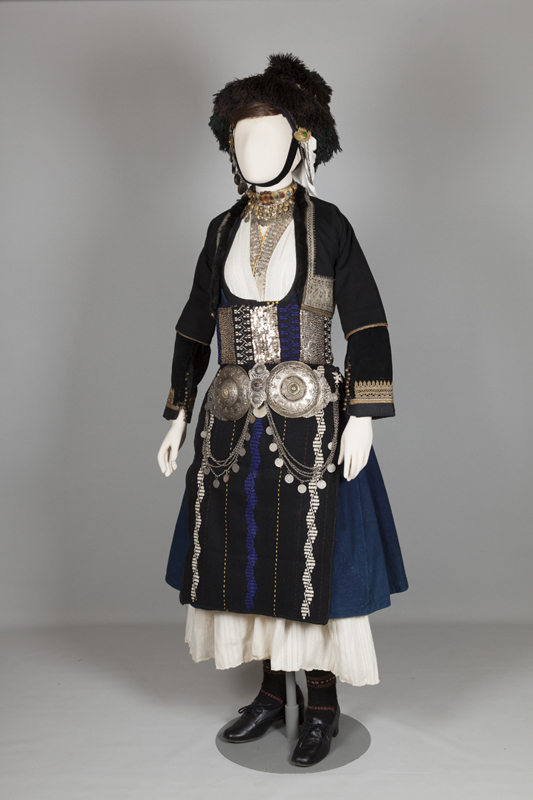
Wedding dress from Alexandria, Macedonia, Greece

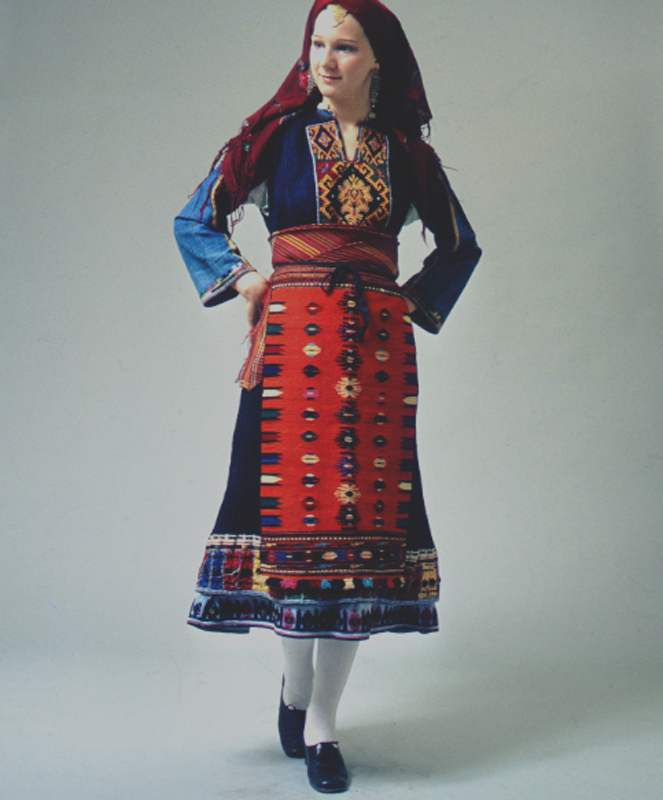
Local Greek costume from Kavakli, from BPF's photo archives

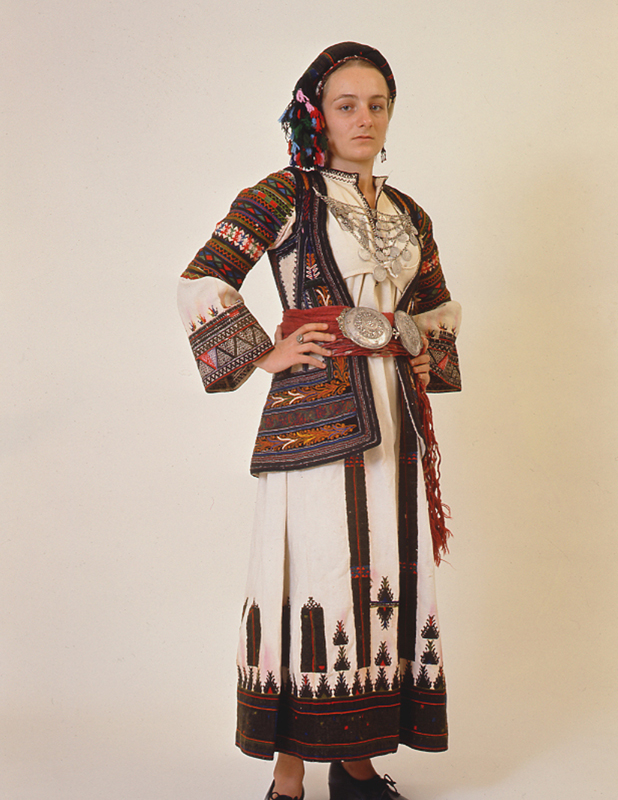
Local costume from Corinthia, Peloponnese, Greece, from BPF's photo archives

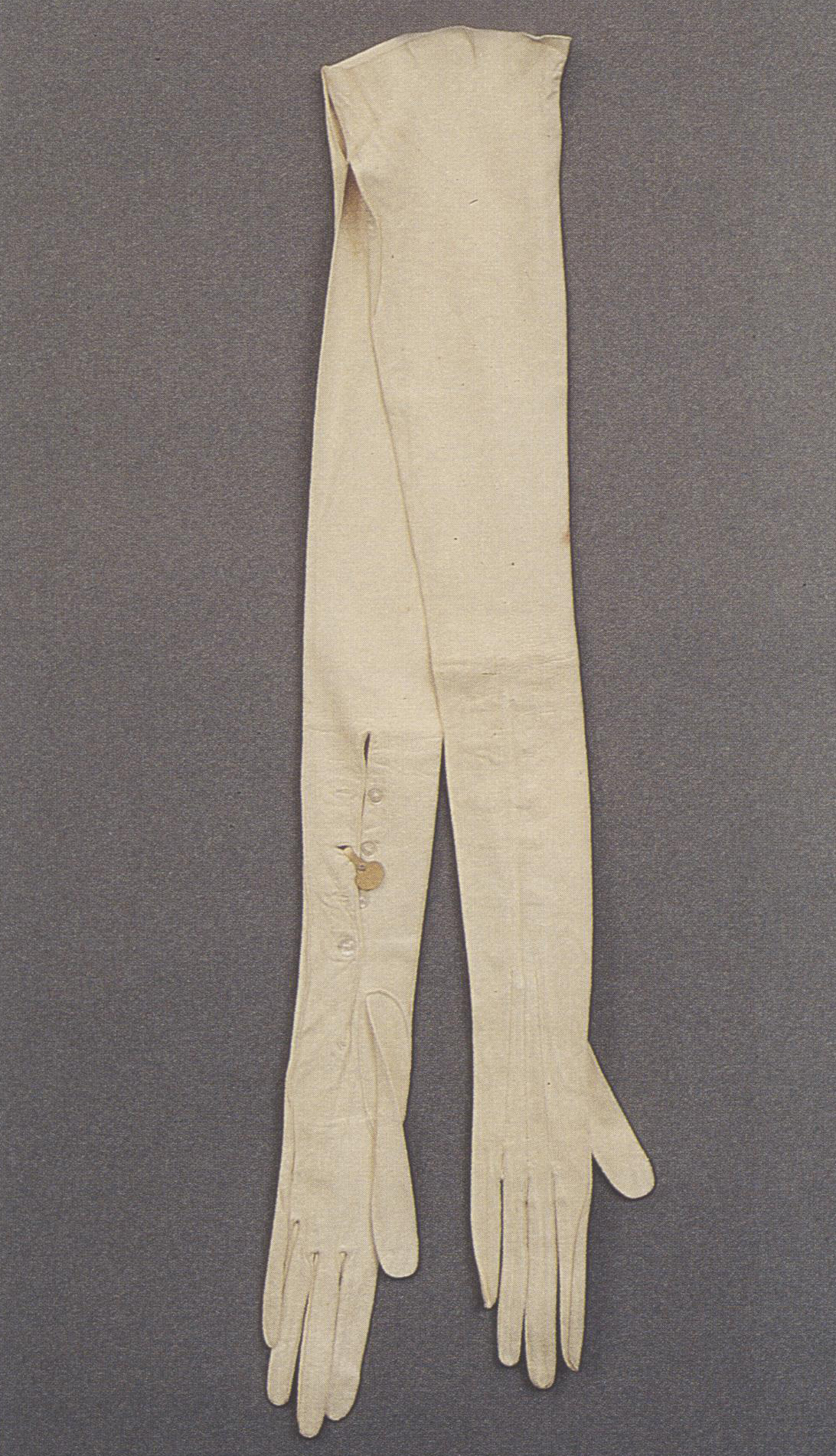
19th century gloves
