= European Museum Forum =

Representative body

The European Museum Forum is a museum organization under the Council of Europe. It is an independent, non-profit-making charity, registered in the United Kingdom and founded in 1977.

The European Museum Forum organizes the annual European Museum of the Year Award (EMYA), also established in 1977. EMYA is awarded to existing museums that have undergone modernization or expansion and newly opened museums, during the previous three years.

== See also ==
- Europa Nostra
- The Best in Heritage
