= Leventis Municipal Museum of Nicosia =

Museum in Nicosia, Cyprus

Coordinates: 35.1706°N 33.3617°E

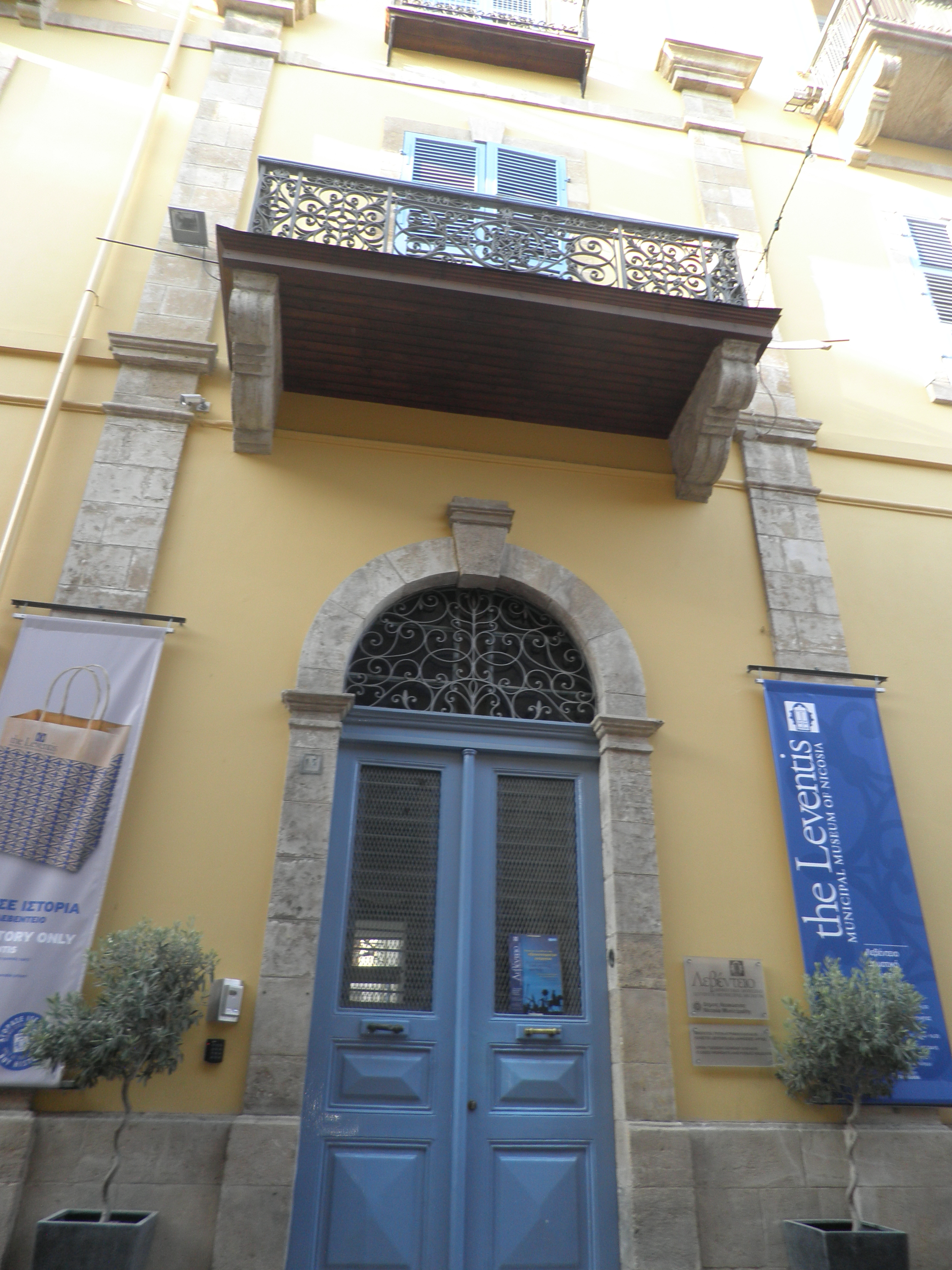
- Established: 1984
- Location: Hippocratous Street, Nicosia
- Type: Archaeological, History
- Curator: Dr Maria Hadjicosti
- Website: www.mcw.gov.cy/da http://leventismuseum.org.cy/

The Leventis Municipal Museum of Nicosia (Greek: Λεβέντιο Μουσείο, romanized: Levéntio Mouseío, Turkish: Leventis Müzesi) in Nicosia, Cyprus, is home to an extensive collection of Cypriot works include archaeological artifacts, costumes, photographs, medieval pottery, maps and engravings, jewels, and furniture.

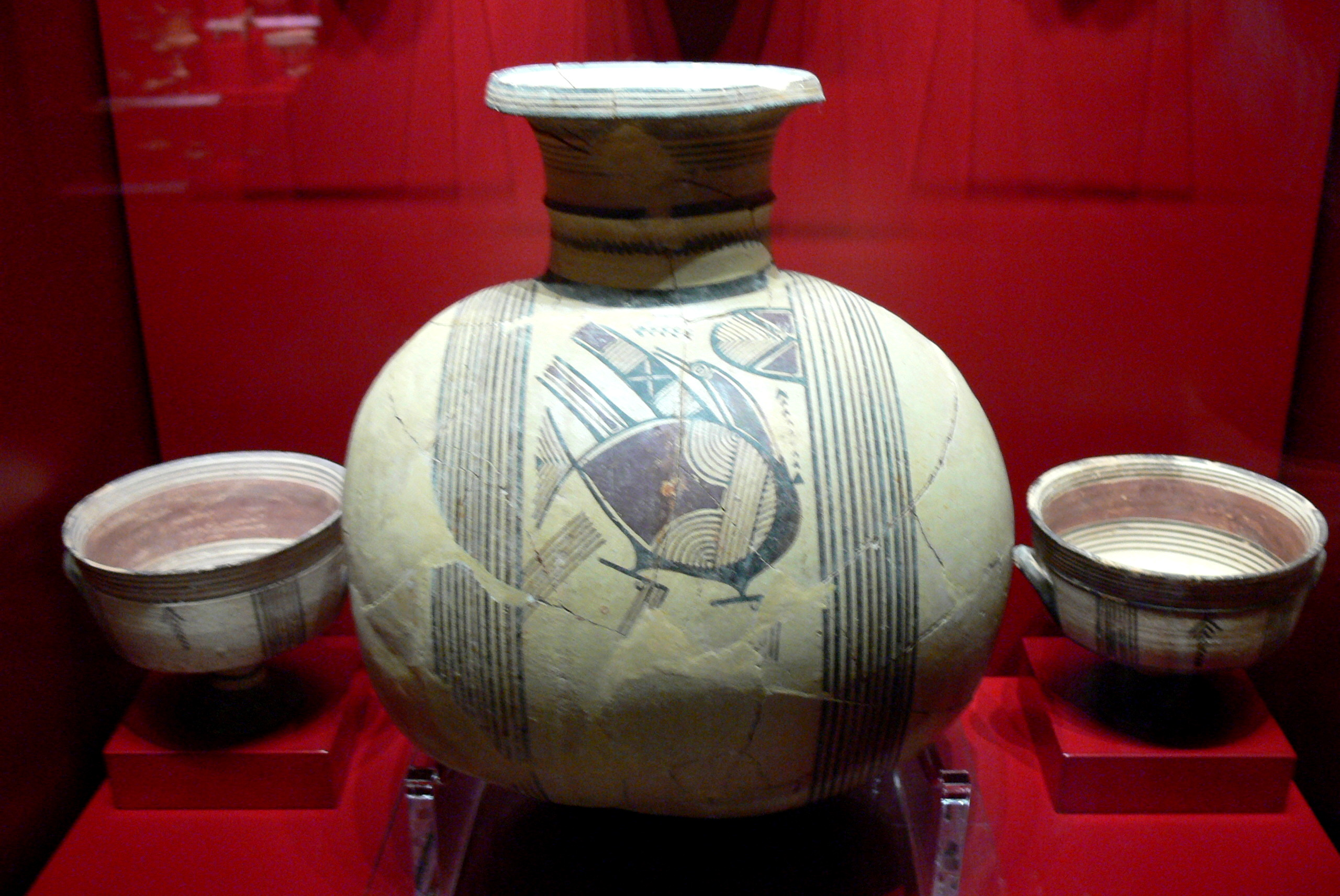
Oenochoe from Archaic period, 750-600 BC

== History ==
The Leventis Municipal Museum of Nicosia presents the history and social development of the city of Nicosia from the Chalcolithic period (3000 BC) to the present day. The museum was founded in 1984 after the initiative of Lellos Demetriades, mayor of Nicosia. The museum is named after its donor, the A. G. Leventis Foundation which bought and restored the building and its administered by the Municipality of Nicosia. In 1985, the Association of the Friends of the Museum was established. Its main objective is to assist in enriching the museum's collections. Anyone may join this association at an annual subscription fee of 5 Cyprus Pounds.

On April 20, 1989, the Municipality of Nicosia and the Anastasios G. Leventis Foundation opened the museum to the public, the first historical museum in Cyprus. The collections displayed in its permanent galleries represent over 5.000 years of the capital's history. The collection of the Museum were established after 1984. Most of them were gathered from donations, private collections, sponsoring and special funding from the Anastasios G. Leventis Foundation. Donations related with the history and social development of Nicosia are always welcome.

== Today ==
The exhibits are arranged so that visitors are guided from the present days of Nicosia, the capital of the Republic of Cyprus, through to the Ancient period (3000 BC). Every year the museum organises and hosts a number of temporary exhibitions, lectures, educational programmes and other events. The Shop of the Museum is run by the Association of the Friends of the Museum. Their task is to increase the sales of the shop, so that they buy and then donate to the Museum new objects for its collections. One may buy various souvenirs, copies of antique objects, books and unique gifts for friends. Every school year, since 1989, the museum has organised special educational programmes for school children of all ages. Special workshops and educational programmes for children and adults are also organised during the year. A small library with publications and other material on the history of Nicosia as well as rare and old publications on Cyprus is open for researchers only by appointment.

== Gallery ==
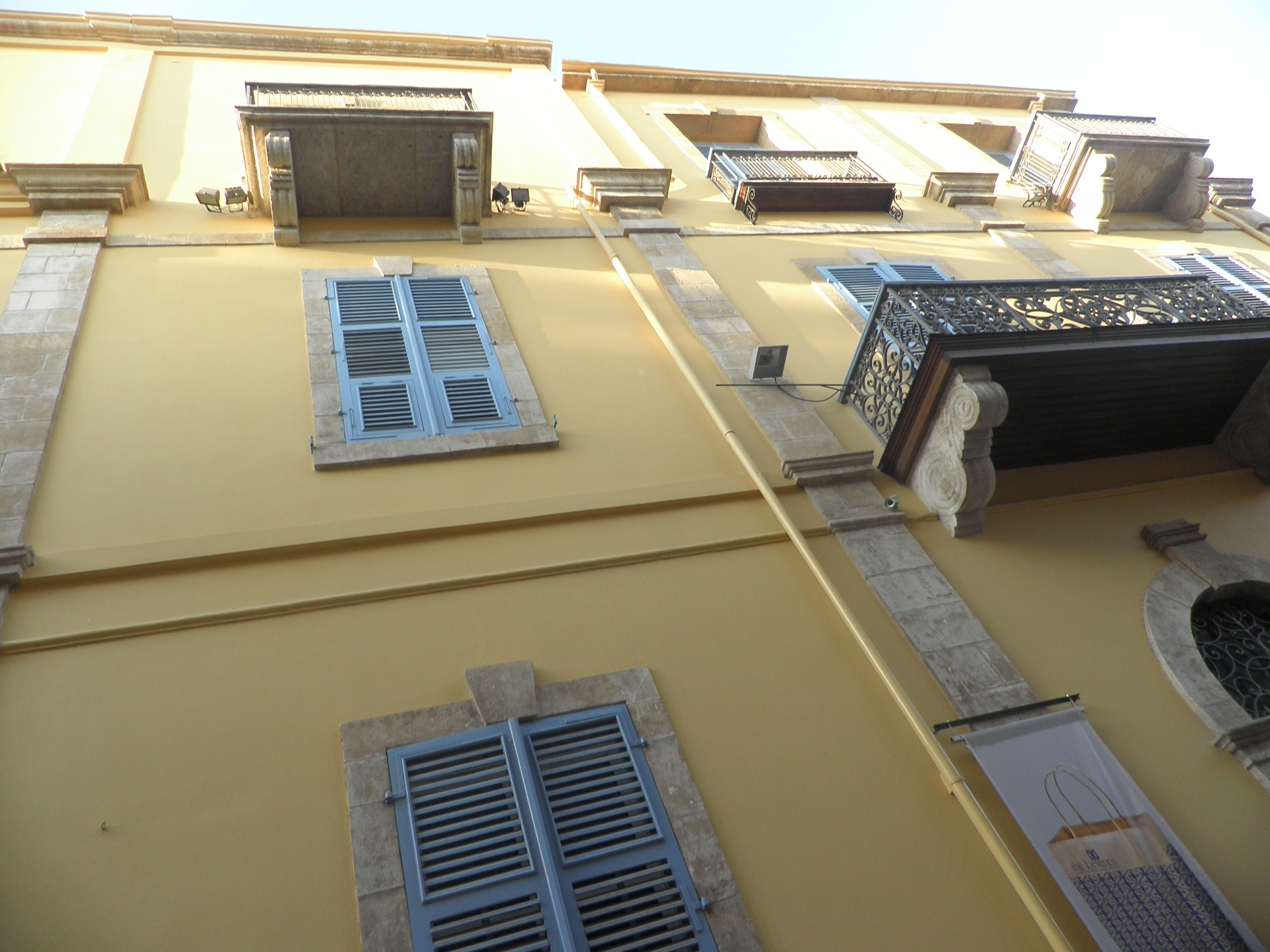
Leventio building (detail).

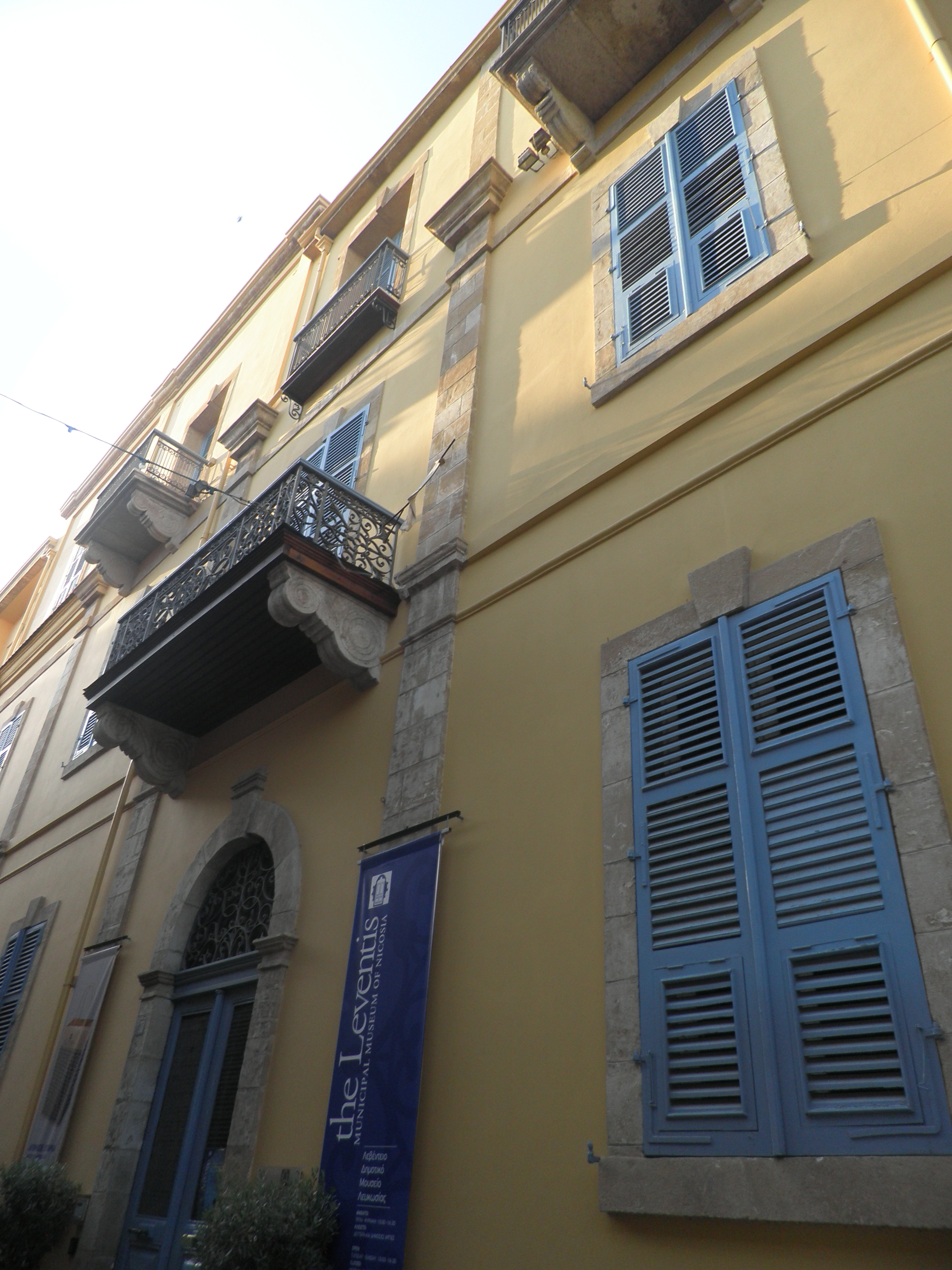
Leventio entrance.

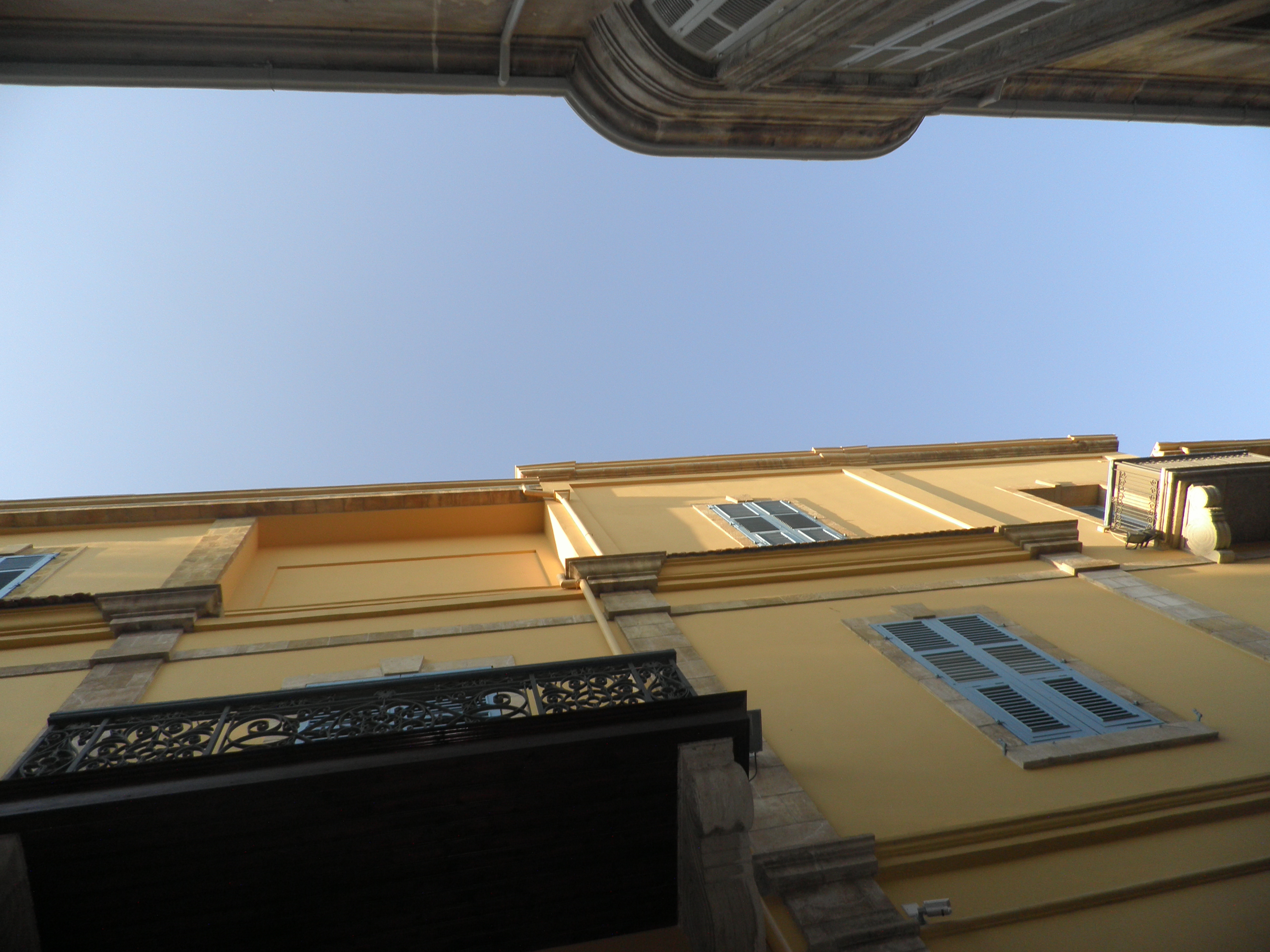
Leventio building (detail).

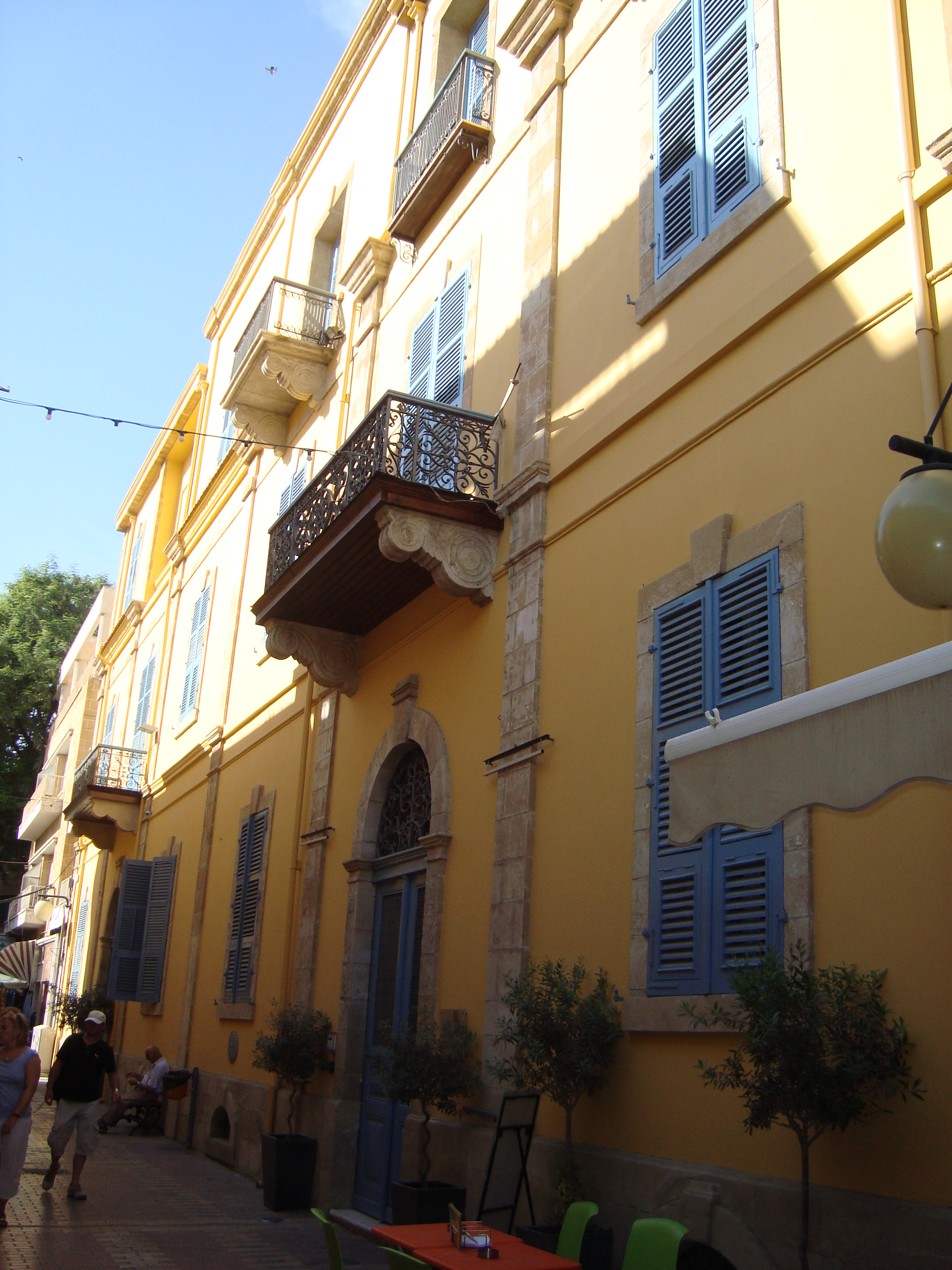
Leventio façade.
