= Europa Nostra =

European organisation for cultural heritage

- Formation: 1963
- Type: NGO and non-profit organization
- Headquarters: The Hague, Netherlands; Brussels, Belgium
- Region served: Europe
- Members: Member organisations, associate organisations, individual members
- President: Cecilia Bartoli
- Website: www.europanostra.org

Europa Nostra (Latin for "Our Europe") is a pan-European Federation for Cultural Heritage, representing citizens' organisations that work on safeguarding Europe's cultural and natural heritage. It is the voice of this movement to relevant international bodies, in particular the European Union, the Council of Europe and UNESCO.

== Organisation and objectives ==
Europa Nostra's network covers almost 50 countries across Europe and beyond. It is composed of over 250 member organisations (heritage associations and foundations), 150 associated organisations (governmental bodies, local authorities and corporations) and 1500 individual members who directly support the mission of Europa Nostra.

Europa Nostra's main goal is to place heritage and its benefits in the mainstream of public consciousness and to make heritage a higher priority for public policy both at European and national levels. Its specific objectives are to promote, at a European level, high standards of quality in the fields of heritage conservation, architecture, urban and rural planning and to advocate a balanced and sustainable development of urban and rural, built and natural environment. Europa Nostra also seeks to highlight the importance of cultural heritage as a building block of European identity and as contributing to a strengthening sense of European citizenship.

Its activities are coordinated by an International Secretariat based in The Hague (Netherlands), assisted by volunteers from various country representations.

Europa Nostra's main activities are:

1. to act as a representative lobby for cultural heritage in Europe
2. to celebrate and promote excellence through the European Union Prize for Cultural Heritage / Europa Nostra Awards;
3. to save Europe's historic monuments, sites and cultural landscapes which are in danger, and
4. to animate a network of cultural heritage stakeholders in Europe.

== History ==
Europa Nostra was founded in 1963 on the initiative of Italia Nostra, as a response to the serious threat to the survival of Venice, caused by regular flooding. In 1991 it merged with the Internationales Burgen Institut (the International Castles Institute), itself created in 1949.

Cecilia Bartoli is President and its Executive President is Hermann Parzinger (Germany). Previous presidents have been World-renowned opera singer Maestro Plácido Domingo (Spain) the Infanta Doña Pilar de Borbón from Spain (2007–2009), the Prince Consort of Denmark (1990–2007) and Hans de Koster from the Netherlands (1984–1990).

== Lobby for cultural heritage ==
Acting as a European cultural heritage lobby, Europa Nostra seeks to secure adequate support for cultural heritage in various areas of European policy-making and funding. It advocates the need to take cultural heritage into consideration when formulating and implementing all European and national policies which have an impact – direct or indirect – on heritage. Europa Nostra also seeks to highlight the importance and the specific character of cultural heritage within the wider cultural and policy agenda of its international partners, the European Union, Council of Europe, and UNESCO.

During its European Heritage Congress held in Amsterdam (June 2011), Europa Nostra and 27 other European and international networks and organisations active in the wider field of cultural heritage decided to set up the European Heritage Alliance 3.3.

In March 2010, Europa Nostra opened a liaison office in Brussels, whose task is to coordinate Europa Nostra's lobbying of EU institutions and other European and international bodies based in Brussels, Strasbourg and Paris.

== European Union Prize for Cultural Heritage/Europa Nostra Awards ==
EU Prize for Cultural Heritage Europa Nostra Awards
- Awarded for: Best practice in heritage conservation
- Country: EU and EFTA members
- First award: 2002
- Website: www.europanostra.org/heritage-awards/

The European Union Prize for Cultural Heritage/Europa Nostra Awards reward excellence in cultural heritage conservation, ranging from the restoration of buildings and their adaptation to new uses, to urban and rural landscape rehabilitation, archaeological site interpretations, and care for art collections. Moreover, it highlights research, dedicated service to heritage conservation by individuals or organisations, and education projects related to cultural heritage. The awards are supported by the Creative Europe programme. It has been organised by Europa Nostra since 2002.

This awards scheme aims to promote high standards and high-quality skills in conservation practice and to stimulate trans-frontier exchange in heritage protection. By spreading the "Power of Example", the awards also aim to encourage further efforts and projects related to heritage throughout Europe.

Europa Nostra is the main partner of "The Best in Heritage", an annual presentation of awarded museum, heritage, and conservation projects, which takes place in the second part of September in the world heritage town of Dubrovnik (Croatia).

== Heritage in Danger ==
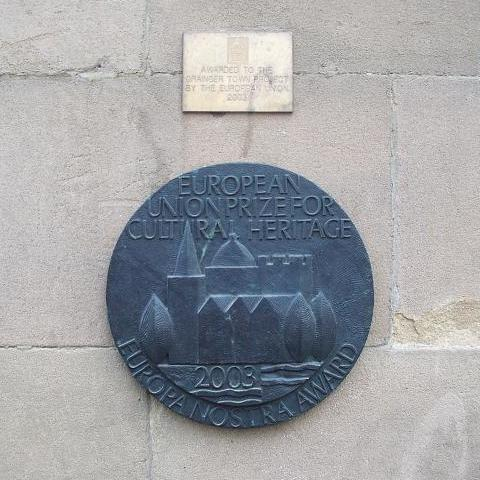
Europa Nostra Award in Newcastle upon Tyne

Europa Nostra supports national and international campaigns for the preservation and rescue of Europe's heritage which is in danger. In January 2013, with the European Investment Bank Group, represented by the EIB Institute, it launched the 7 Most Endangered Programme, aiming to identify endangered monuments and sites in Europe and to mobilize public and private partners at the local, national, and European levels, to find a future for those sites, working as a catalyst for action. The 7 Most Endangered sites and monuments for 2013 were selected from a shortlist of 14 prepared by an international panel that reviewed 40 nominations from member organizations from 21 countries.

In recent years, Europa Nostra has raised its voice to save endangered historic monuments, sites or landscapes in Europe, including:

- The area of Rosia Montana (Romania) whose heritage and environment is threatened by a proposed open-cast gold mine;
- The Roman archaeological site of Allianoi (Turkey) threatened by the construction of an irrigation dam (today, the site has disappeared under water);
- Mont Saint-Michel (Normandy, France) threatened by the proposed construction of giant wind turbines having a negative visual impact on the cultural landscape surrounding the Mont;
- Italian historic cities, mainly in the Emilia Romagna region, affected by the earthquakes in May 2012;
- The Ancient City of l'Aquila and the surrounding distinctive villages (Abruzzo Region, Italy) threatened by various degrees of destruction or damage caused by the April 2009 earthquake;
- The Ancient City of Famagusta (Cyprus) threatened by neglect caused by on-going political conflict;
- The remains of the Mediaeval Town Hall of Berlin (Germany) as well as the city's historic gas lanterns both threatened by new infrastructure works;
- The Piazza Sant'Ambrogio in Milan (Lombardy, Italy) threatened by the proposed construction of an underground car-park;
- The ancient Visoki Dečani monastery in Deçan (Republic of Kosovo) threatened by neglect and attack caused by on-going political conflict.

== Pan-European Network ==
Europa Nostra serves as a platform for exchange for those concerned with heritage conservation, education, research, communication and interpretation. It enables heritage professionals, volunteers and supporters from all over Europe and beyond to meet, debate and inspire each other. It also engages with a wider range of stakeholders, be they policy makers, other European or international networks related to heritage, students and young heritage professionals or the public at large. Europa Nostra is a partner of Wiki Loves Monuments, the Wikipedia photo contest around cultural heritage.

Europa Nostra organises an annual European Heritage Congress, including a public Forum on various heritage subjects that are of relevance to the whole of Europe. It also holds smaller-scale national, regional and local meetings and debates with heritage NGOs in different parts of Europe. In addition to this, Europa Nostra's Scientific Council organises an annual Colloquium to promote and coordinate the scientific study of ancient structures and fortified buildings in Europe.

== Publications ==
Europa Nostra publishes an annual magazine restyled in 2010 with the name "Heritage in Motion" ISSN 1871-417X. This magazine contains articles related to cultural heritage actors and initiatives in the country or the city which hosts the annual congress of Europa Nostra. Its previous name was "European Cultural Heritage Review" ISSN 1871-417X.

Europa Nostra's Scientific Council has also published a total of 64 volumes of its "Scientific Bulletin".

== Membership ==
Europa Nostra is a non-profit organisation, which is financially supported by membership fees and donations, by the European Commission and other public bodies and private supporters and sponsors.

Europa Nostra's membership is made up of different categories:

- Any non-governmental and not-for-profit organisation (e.g. association, foundation or museum) working actively to safeguard the cultural and natural heritage at European, national, regional and/or local level can submit an application to become a Member Organisation.
- Any public or private body not qualified to join as a Member Organisation (e.g. regions, cities, towns, governmental heritage agencies, educational institutions, tourism organisations and worldwide heritage organisation) can submit an application to become an Associate Organisation.
- Individuals who wish to directly support Europa Nostra's action can become an Individual Member.

== See also ==
- Art conservation and restoration
- Convention for the protection of the architectural heritage of Europe
- European Heritage Alliance 3.3
- European Heritage Days
- European Museum Forum
- Global Heritage Fund
- Hague Convention for the Protection of Cultural Property in the Event of Armed Conflict
- International Committee of the Blue Shield
- International Council on Monuments and Sites
- List of World Heritage Sites in Europe
- The Best in Heritage
- World Heritage Convention
- World Heritage Site
- World Monuments Fund
