= The Best in Heritage =

Survey of award-winning museum, heritage and conservation projects

The Best in Heritage is an international, annual survey of award-winning museum, heritage and conservation projects. It was launched in 2003 by the European Heritage Association from Zagreb under the leadership of Professor Tomislav S. Šola. The event was in the city of Dubrovnik until 2019, from 2020 to 2024 as a series of video interviews on YouTube, and in 2025 and 2026 in Barcelona. The aim of the conference is to give prize-winning projects from the preceding year further professional and media attention. The event serves to identify and promote the best museum, heritage and conservation projects in the world.

== The event ==
The Best in Heritage is an annual presentation of awarded museum, heritage, and conservation projects. Over 40 hand-picked projects and institutions that have received national or international awards in the previous year are presented by their authors or institution directors, followed by discussions, exhibitions and receptions. Presenters explain why their achievements were proclaimed the best in the previous year and received an award. The aim is to present quality projects covering all aspects of care and communication of heritage.

== IMAGINES ==
At the IMAGINES event new technologies and multimedia projects are presented in a one-day programme.

== Patronage ==
Barcelona events are organised in partnership with La Caixa Foundation, the Government of Catalonia, City Council of Barcelona, and the Barcelona Provincial Council. And under patronage of Europa Nostra and International Council of Museums (ICOM), Other supporters and patrons over the years have been: ICOMOS, ICCROM, International Federation of Library Associations, the City of Dubrovnik and the Croatian Ministry of Culture.

== Projects of Influence ==
From 2015 onwards, the conference audience, together with moderators and last year's winners, votes for the "Project of influence" award for each of the two events, winners of which are announced at the closing ceremony.
