= Royal Army Chaplains' Department =

British Army military unit

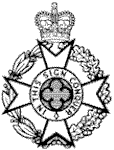
- Cap Badge of the Royal Army Chaplains' Department; for Jewish padres the Maltese Cross is replaced by a Star of David
- Active: 23 September 1796 – present
- Country: United Kingdom
- Branch: British Army
- Role: Chaplaincy
- Garrison/HQ: Marlborough Lines, Andover
- Motto: "In this Sign Conquer"
- March: Prince of Denmark's March (Trumpet Voluntary)

Commanders
- Chaplain General: Michael Parker
- Patron: Queen Camilla

Insignia
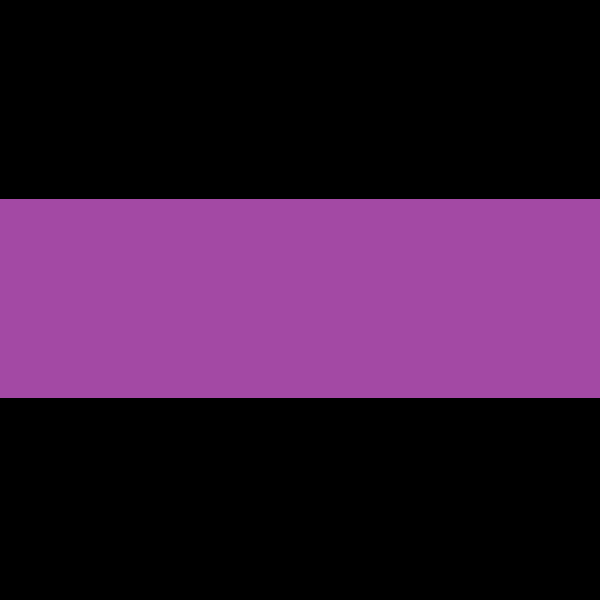
- Tactical recognition flash

The Royal Army Chaplains' Department (RAChD) is an all-officer department that provides ordained clergy and non-religious chaplains to the British Army.

== History ==
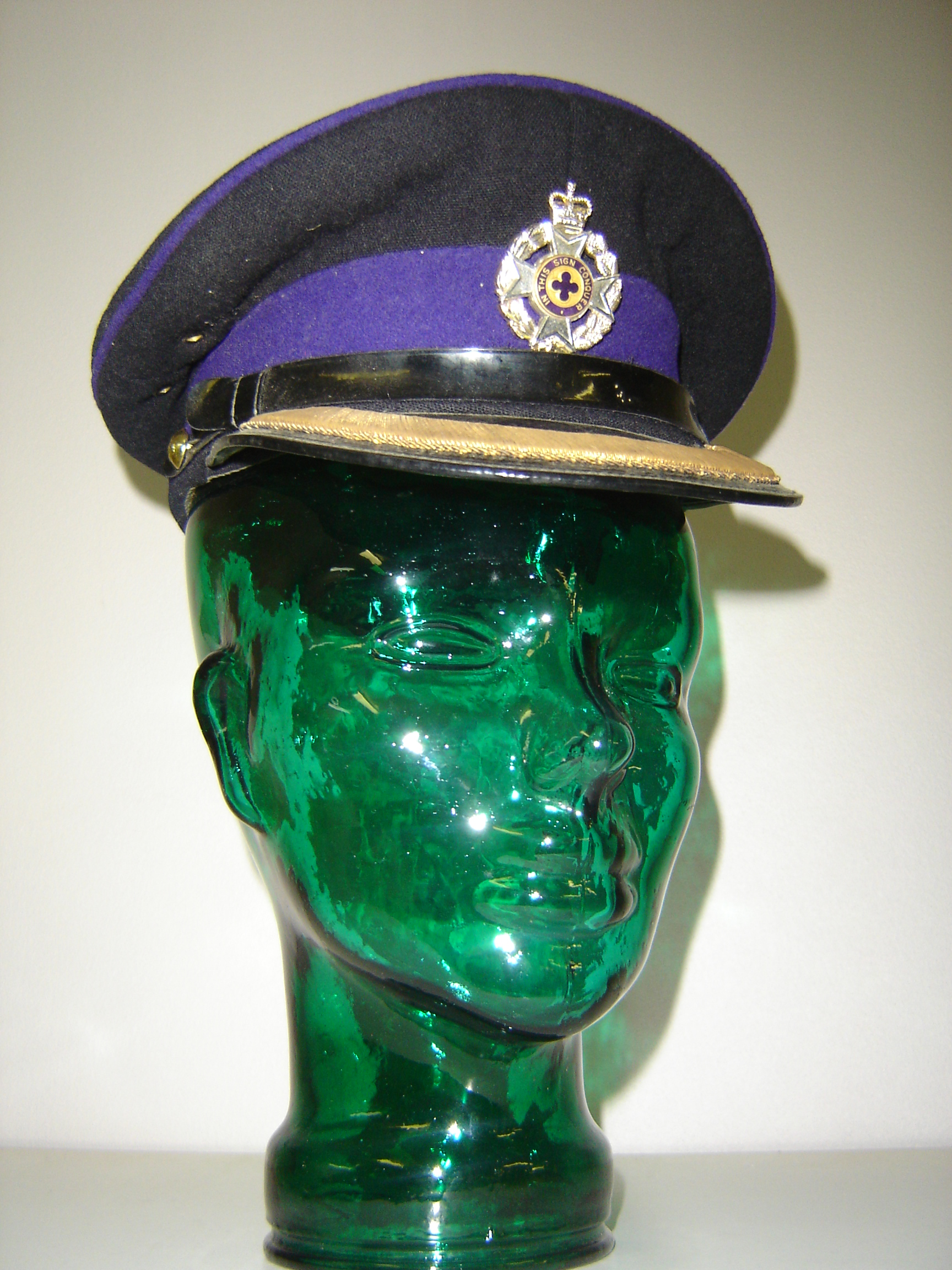
A post 1953 RAChD No.1 dress cap

The Army Chaplains' Department (AChD) was formed by Royal Warrant of 23 September 1796; until then chaplains had been part of individual regiments, but not on the central establishment. Only Anglican chaplains were recruited until 1827, when Presbyterians were recognised, but not commissioned until 1858. Roman Catholic chaplains were recruited from 1836, Methodist chaplains from 1881, and Jewish chaplains from 1892. During the First World War some 4,400 Army Chaplains were recruited and 179 lost their lives on active service. The department received the "Royal" prefix in February 1919. During the Second World War another 96 British and 38 Commonwealth Army Chaplains lost their lives.

From 1946 to 1996, the RAChD's Headquarters, Depot and Training Centre were at Bagshot Park in Surrey, now the home of The Duke and Duchess of Edinburgh. In 1996, they moved to the joint service Armed Forces Chaplaincy Centre at Amport House near Andover, Hampshire. Since 2020 the joint centre has been based at Beckett House, part of the Defence Academy of the United Kingdom, just outside Shrivenham, Oxfordshire. In November 2023, the Ministry of Defence announced the intent to recruit Non-Religious Pastoral Support Officers into chaplaincy in order to reflect the changing demographics of the United Kingdom and HM Forces.

== Selection and training ==
Candidates, both regular and reserve, first make a familiarisation visit to meet serving chaplains at an Army camp. They proceed to the Army Officer Selection Board at Leighton House, Westbury, for physical and mental assessment. Successful candidates receive initial training at the Armed Forces Chaplaincy Centre, Beckett House, Shrivenham and the Royal Military Academy Sandhurst.

Candidates for chaplain to the Army Cadet Force are interviewed by the Regional Senior Chaplain, then attend a regional Army Cadets Commissions Board. Successful candidates undergo familiarisation, followed by initial training at the Armed Forces Chaplaincy Centre.

== Role ==
Serving regular chaplains in the British Army can be Catholic, one of several Protestant denominations, Jewish, Muslim, non-religious, Hindu or Sikh. Uniquely within the Army, the Royal Army Chaplains' Department has different cap badges for its Christian and Jewish officers.

Army chaplains, although they are all commissioned officers of the British Army and wear uniform, do not have executive authority. They are unique within the Army in that they do not carry arms. Many chaplains have been decorated for bravery in action, including four awarded Victoria Crosses: James Adams, Noel Mellish, Theodore Hardy and William Addison. At services on formal occasions, chaplains wear their medals and decorations on their clerical robes.

The RAChD's motto is "In this Sign Conquer" as seen in the sky before the Battle of the Milvian Bridge by the Roman Emperor Constantine. Its regimental march, both quick and slow, is the Prince of Denmark's March, erroneously known as the Trumpet Voluntary.

== Museum ==
The Royal Army Chaplains' Museum is at Shrivenham, in a new building opened by the Countess of Wessex on 17 May 2022. Its newly curated collection replaced the Museum of Army Chaplaincy which was at Amport House near Andover, Hampshire until 2019.

== Faith denominations and belief backgrounds ==
The Ministry of Defence recognises chaplains from the following endorsing authorities:

- Anglican (Church of England, Church of Ireland, Church in Wales and Scottish Episcopal Church)
- Assemblies of God
- Baptist Union of Great Britain
- Buddhist
- Church of Scotland
- Church of Jesus Christ of Latter-day Saints
- Free Church of Scotland
- Churches in Communities International
- Congregational Federation
- Elim Pentecostal Church
- Hindu
- Jewish
- Methodist Church
- Muslim
- Non-religious (e.g. Humanists, Agnostic or Atheist)
- Presbyterian Church in Ireland
- Roman Catholic Church
- United Reformed Church
- Salvation Army
- Sikh faith

There are also religious advisors from other faiths.

An Army chaplain is expected to minister to and provide pastoral care to any soldier who needs it, no matter their denomination or faith or lack of it.

In 2004, Defence Minister Ivor Caplin said: “It is our aspiration to have armed forces which are representative of UK society as a whole.” The move might also help when dealing with soldiers in other armies from different faiths. At the time there were about 740 personnel that declared themselves to be from the four other main religions, but only Christian chaplains are employed by the Ministry of Defence. The number of non religious Ministry of Defence personnel including those in uniform numbered in the tens of thousands.

In 2011, following a freedom of information request on Ministry of Defence spending on chaplaincy, the National Secular Society proposed that £22m of spending should come directly from churches while professional counselling should continue to be funded by the taxpayer, in order to better serve the non-religious in the military. The proposal was rejected by the Church of England.

In September 2021, Defence Humanists, through a submission to the Government’s Integrated Review of foreign policy, defence, security and international development, called for an independent review of pastoral support for the armed forces which takes into account the nation’s changing religion and belief demographics and the need for a multi-faith and belief approach. In November 2023, the Ministry of Defence announced the intent to recruit Non-Religious Pastoral Support Officers into chaplaincy in order to reflect the changing demographics of the United Kingdom and HM Forces. The armed forces of the Netherlands have had Humanist chaplains since 1964, known as Humanist Counseling in the Dutch Armed Forces.

== Ranks ==
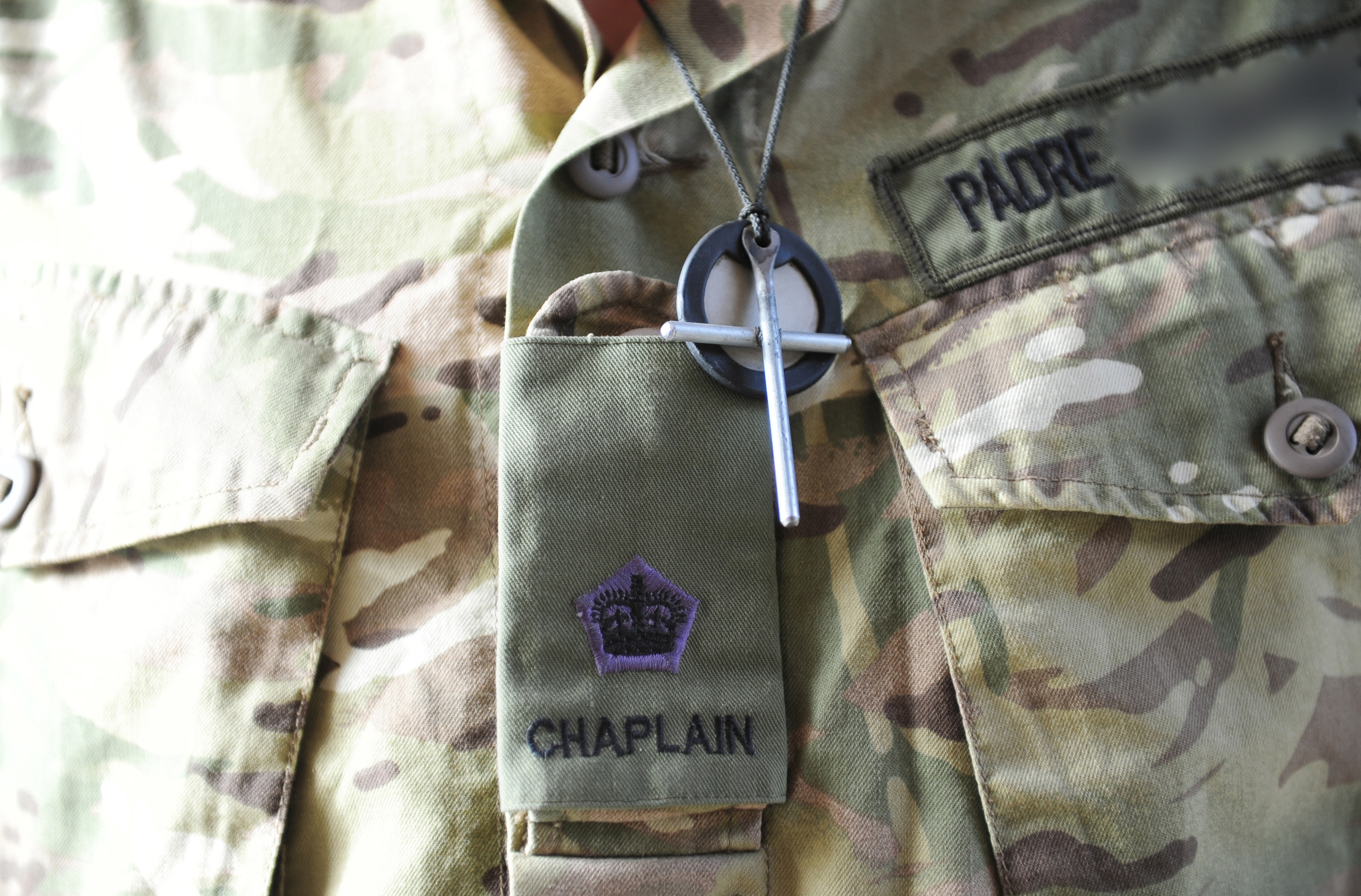
The insignia of a Chaplain to the Forces 3rd Class

Chaplains are the only British Army officers who do not carry standard officer ranks. They are instead designated Chaplain to the Forces (CF) (e.g. "The Reverend John Smith CF"). They do, however, have grades which equate to the standard ranks and wear the insignia of the equivalent rank. Chaplains are usually addressed as "Padre" /ˈpɑːdreɪ/, never by their nominal military rank.

- Chaplain-General (CG) = Major-General
- Deputy Chaplain-General (DCG) = Brigadier
- Chaplain to the Forces 1st Class (CF1) = Colonel
- Chaplain to the Forces 2nd Class (CF2) = Lieutenant-Colonel
- Chaplain to the Forces 3rd Class (CF3) = Major
- Chaplain to the Forces 4th Class (CF4) = Captain

The senior Church of England chaplain is ranked within the church hierarchy as an archdeacon, and he or she holds the appointment of Archdeacon for the Army whether or not he or she is also the Chaplain-General. The senior Roman Catholic Chaplain (usually a CF1) is sometimes ranked as a monsignor.

== List of Chaplains General ==
Term Began	Term Ended	Name	Notes
4 October 1796	1810	John Gamble	Resigned
10 March 1810	1824	John Owen	Died in position
12 July 1824	1844	Robert Hodgson	Died in position
2 July 1846	1875	George Gleig	Retired
7 April 1875	1884	Piers Claughton	Died in position
8 February 1885	1 November 1901	Cox Edghill	Retired
1 November 1901	1925	John Taylor Smith	
1925	1931	Alfred Jarvis	Resigned
1931	1939	Ernest Thorold	
1939	1944	Charles Symons	Retired
6 November 1944	1951	Llewelyn Hughes	Resigned
6 November 1951	1960	Victor Pike	Resigned
11 June 1960	1966	Ivan Neill	
8 February 1966	1974	John Youens	Retired
1 July 1974	1980	Peter Mallett	
1980	31 December 1986	Frank Johnston	
1 January 1987	1995	James Harkness	Scottish Presbyterian, first non-Anglican Chaplain-General
3 February 1995	2000	Victor Dobbin	Irish Presbyterian minister
13 May 2000	2004	John Blackburn	
2004	2008	David Wilkes	Methodist
2008	2011	Stephen Robbins	
29 July 2011	2014	Jonathan Woodhouse	Baptist
September 2014	2018	David Coulter	Church of Scotland
December 2018	2022	Clinton Langston	
May 2022	Present	Michael Parker	Methodist

=== Deputy Chaplains General ===
Term Began	Term Ended	Name	Notes
1915	1919	Llewellyn Gwynne	
1941	1945	Alfred Thomas Arthur Naylor	
1985	1986	James Harkness	Church of Scotland, later Chaplain General
1986	1989	Tom Robinson	
1989	1993	Graham Roblin	
1993	1995	Alan Dean	
1996	1999	John Holliman	
1999	2000	John Blackburn	later Chaplain General
2000	2004	David Wilkes	Methodist, later Chaplain General
2008	2011	Jonathan Woodhouse	Baptist, later Chaplain General
2011	2014	David Coulter	Church of Scotland, later Chaplain General
2014	2017	Peter Eagles	
2017	2018	Clinton Langston	later Chaplain General
2018	2020	Michael Fava	Catholic
2020	2022	Michael Parker	Methodist, later Chaplain General
2022	Present	David Barrett	Methodist

== Order of precedence ==
Preceded by Special Reconnaissance Regiment	Order of Precedence	Succeeded by Royal Logistic Corps

== Notable British Army chaplains ==
- Michael Adler
- William Addison
- Edward Armstrong Bennett
- Harry Blackburne
- A. C. Bouquet
- Tubby Clayton, founder of Toc H
- Francis Lyon Cohen
- David Cooper
- Cox Edghill
- Willie Doyle
- Francis Gleeson
- Samuel Leighton Green
- Alexander Macdonell
- Theodore Hardy
- James Harkness
- Hugh Hornby
- Rupert Inglis, former England rugby international
- Geoffrey Studdert Kennedy ("Woodbine Willie")
- Noel Mellish
- George Smith, padre at Rorke's Drift
- Neville Talbot
- Maurice Wood
- Edmond Kelly

== Gallery ==
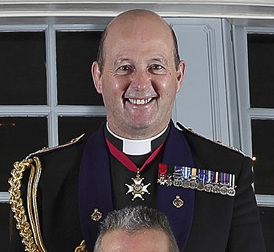
David Coulter in mess dress

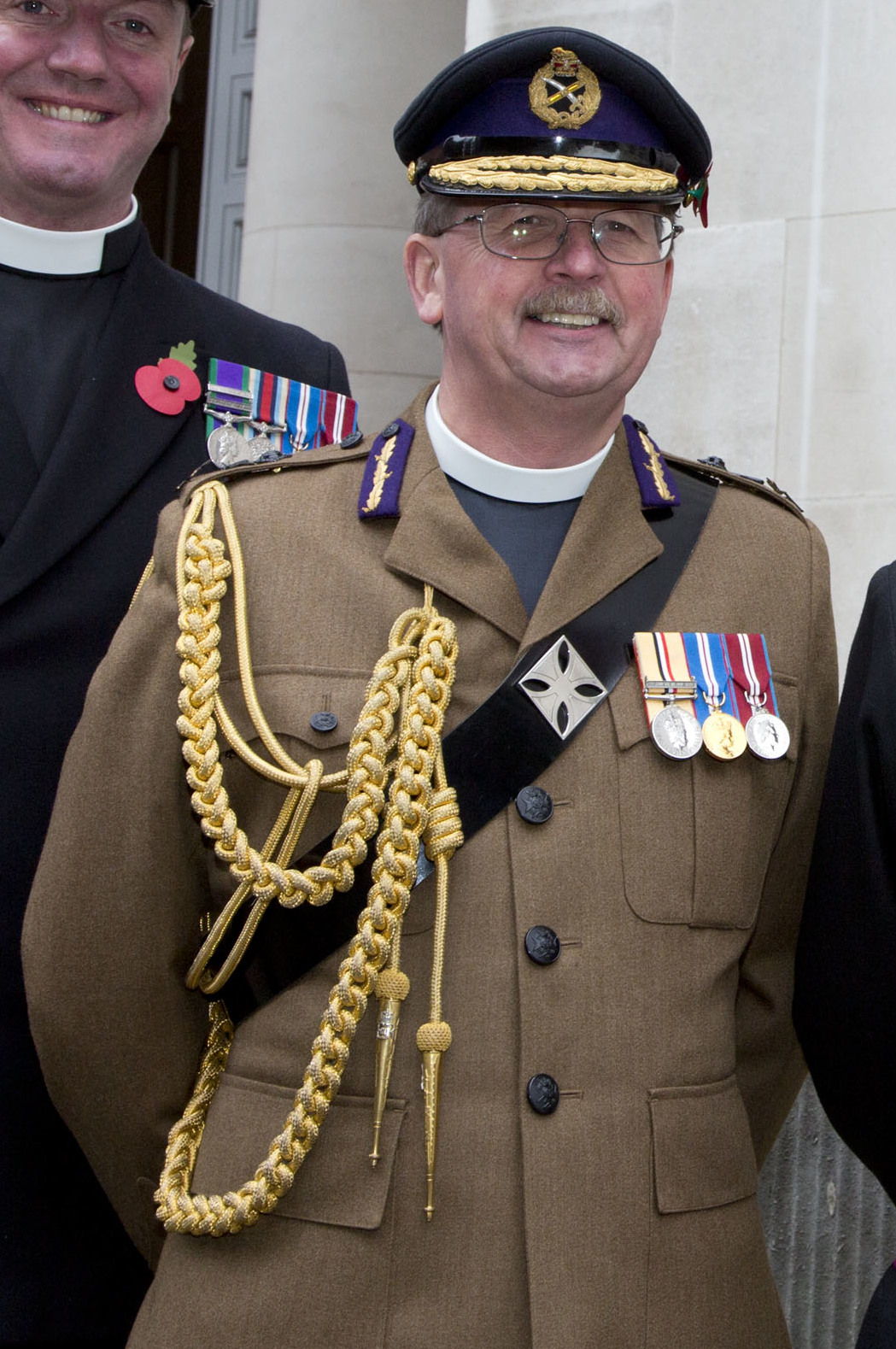
Jonathan Woodhouse in service dress

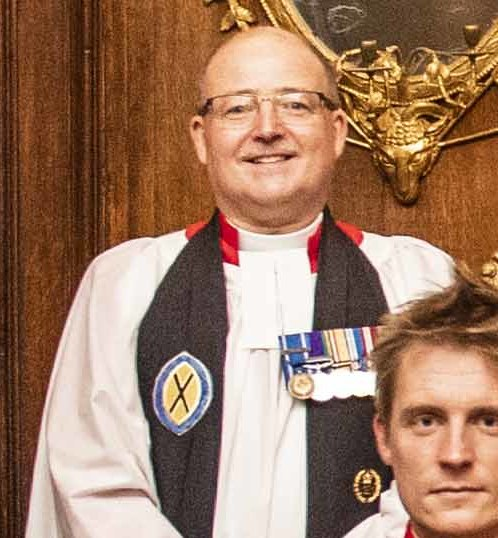
Clinton Langston in choir dress with medals

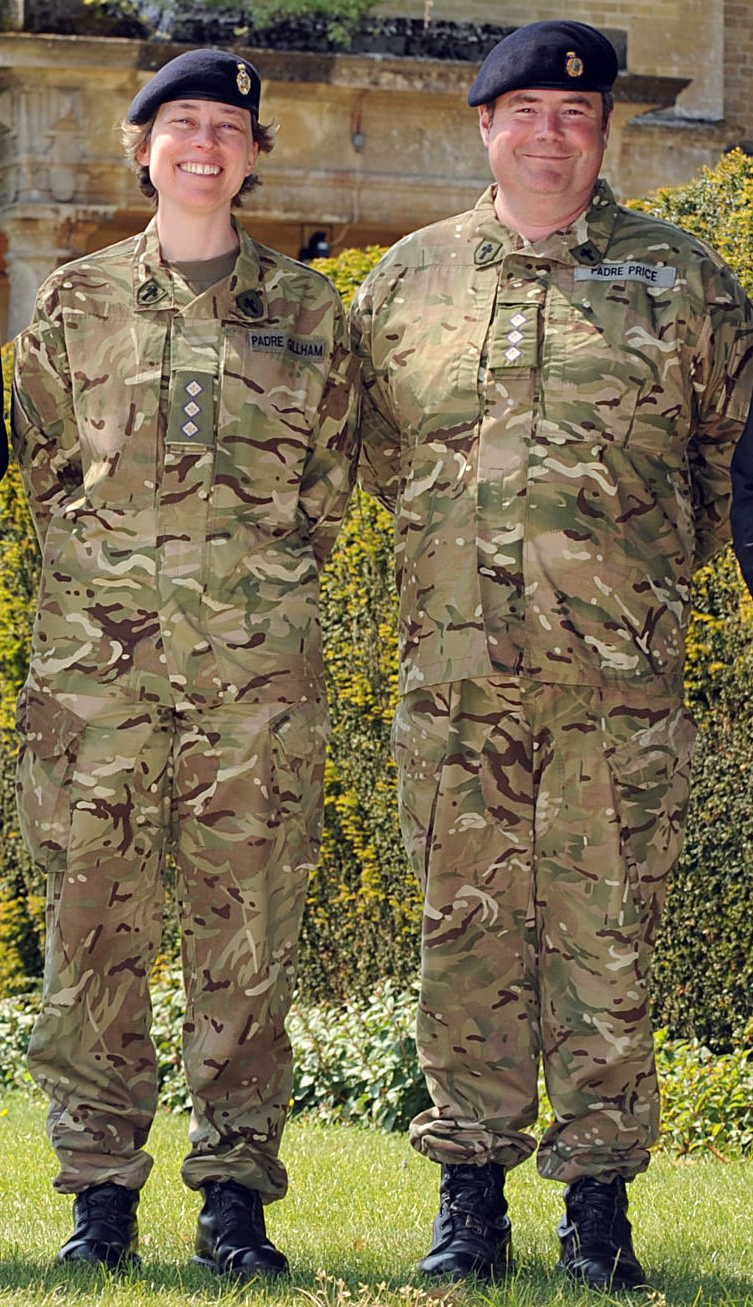
Padres in combat dress

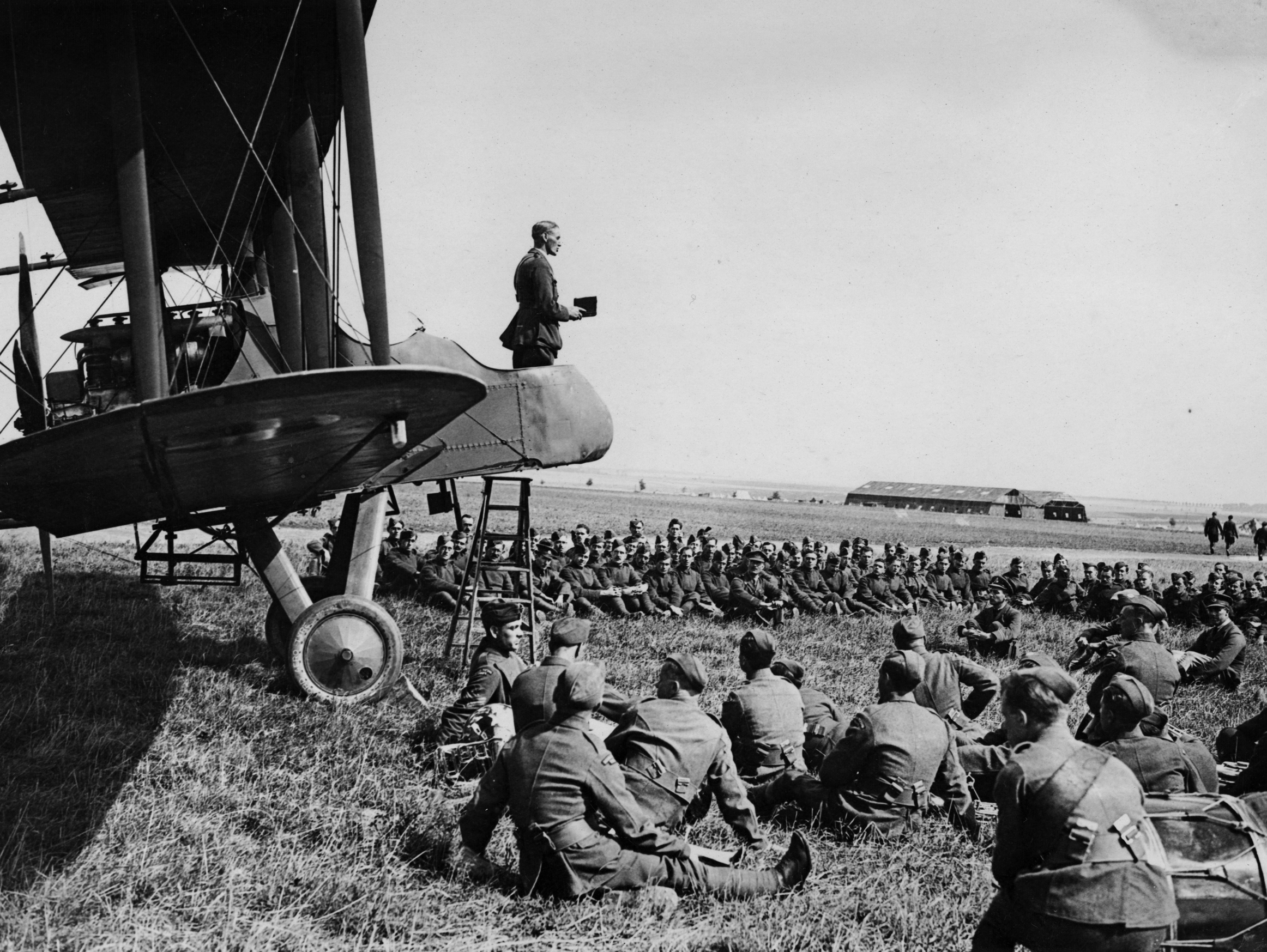
An army chaplain conducts a service from the cockpit of an aeroplane, France, during World War I

== See also ==
- Royal Air Force Chaplains Branch
- Royal Navy Chaplaincy Service
- Bishop to the Forces (Anglican)
- Bishopric of the Forces (Roman Catholic)
- Military chaplain#United Kingdom
- International Military Chiefs of Chaplains Conference
- Religion in the United Kingdom
- Toc H
- Military archdeacons
- Category:Royal Army Chaplains' Department officers

== Sources ==
- Snape, Michael (2008). The Royal Army Chaplains' Department, 1796–1953: Clergy Under Fire. Studies in modern British religious history. Boydell Press. ISBN 978-1-84383-346-8.
