= Clinton Langston =

British Anglican priest and military chaplain

The Venerable Clinton Langston CB QHC
- Archdeacon for the Army
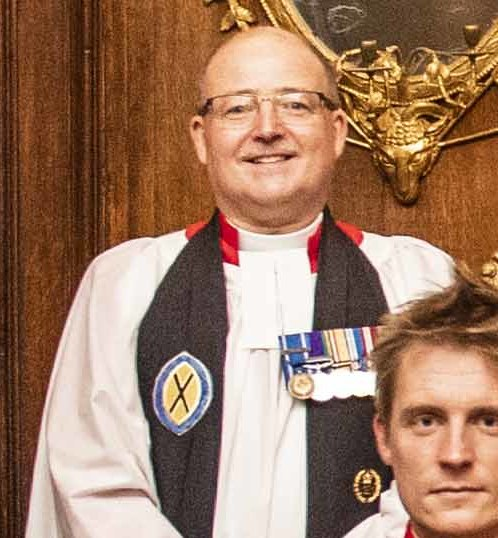
- Langston in 2019
- Church: Church of England
- In office: 14 July 2017 – 8 May 2022
- Predecessor: Peter Eagles
- Other posts: Chaplain General, British Army (2018–2022)

Orders
- Ordination: 1990 (deacon); 1991 (priest)

Personal details
- Born: Clinton Matthew Langston; 1962 (age 63–64)
- Denomination: Anglicanism
- Education: Derby College of Education; Queen's College, Birmingham
- Military career
- Allegiance: United Kingdom
- Branch: British Army
- Service years: 1994–2023
- Rank: Chaplain General (equivalent to major general)
- Unit: Royal Army Chaplains' Department
- Conflicts: Bosnian War; The Troubles; Iraq War
- Awards: Companion of the Order of the Bath

Clinton Matthew Langston, CB, QHC (born 1962) is a British Anglican priest and military chaplain. He served as Chaplain General of the Royal Army Chaplains' Department, British Army between 2018 and 2022, and as Archdeacon for the Army in the Church of England between 2017 and 2022. He was previously Deputy Chaplain General from 2017 to 2018.

== Early life and education ==
Langston was born in 1962. He studied at the Derby College of Education, graduating with a Bachelor of Combined Studies (BCombStuds) in 1986. In 1987, he matriculated into Queen's College, Birmingham, an ecumenical theological college in Birmingham to train for ordained ministry and to study theology.

== Ordained ministry ==
Langston was ordained in the Church of England as a deacon in 1990 and as a priest in 1991. From 1990 to 1994, he served his curacy at St James the Great, Shirley in the Diocese of Birmingham.

=== Military service ===
On 20 June 1994, Langston was commissioned into the Royal Army Chaplains' Department (RAChD) as a Chaplain to the Forces 4th Class (equivalent in rank to captain). From 1994, he was based in Germany as chaplain to the Light Dragoons. He was deployed to Bosnia in 1996 with 7 Signal Regiment, and to Northern Ireland for a two year tour from 1998 to 2000. On 20 June 1999, he moved from a Short Service Commission (limiting his service years) to a Regular Commission (allowing him to serve until retirement). He was promoted to Chaplain to the Forces 3rd Class (equivalent to major) on 2 June 2000. From 2000 to 2003, he served as chaplain to Army Training Regiment, Lichfield, based at Whittington Barracks. He then returned to Germany, where he was senior chaplain of the 4th Infantry Brigade. During this time, he served a six month tour in Iraq as Joint Force Senior Chaplain.

He was promoted to Chaplain to the Forces 2nd Class (equivalent to lieutenant colonel) on 30 June 2006. He then returned to the UK, where he had been appointed senior chaplain to 15 (North East) Brigade. From 2008 to 2010, he was Staff Chaplain at Permanent Joint Headquarters, a tri-service appointment with responsibility for chaplaincy delivery on Operation Herrick and Operation Telic, and other overseas and seaborne operations. From 2010 to 2012, he was senior chaplain to the Household Division and chaplain of the Guards' Chapel. From 2012 to 2014, he was senior chaplain to Army Recruitment and Training Division (North). He was promoted to Chaplain to the Forces 1st Class (equivalent to colonel) on 30 June 2014. From 2014 to 2015, he was based at HQ Army Recruitment and Training Division as assistant chaplain general. Then, from July 2015 to May 2017, he was attached to 3rd (United Kingdom) Division.

On 15 May 2017, Langston took up the appointment of Deputy Chaplain General, the second most senior chaplain in the RAChD. He was promoted to the rank of deputy chaplain general (equivalent to brigadier) on 30 June 2017. On 14 July 2017, he was licensed and collated as the Archdeacon for the Army: as such, he is a member of the General Synod of the Church of England. He was made a non-residentiary canon of Salisbury Cathedral in October 2018. On 14 December 2018, Langston was appointed Chaplain-General to Her Majesty's Land Forces: the Chaplain General is equivalent in rank to a major general. He stepped down in May 2022, and retired from the army in July 2023.

In addition to seeing service across the United Kingdom, Langston has been posted to Germany, Bosnia, and Iraq.

== Honours ==

Langston has been awarded a number of campaign medals: the NATO Medal for the former Republic of Yugoslavia, the General Service Medal with Northern Ireland clasp, and the Iraq Medal. He has also been awarded the Queen Elizabeth II Golden Jubilee Medal, the Queen Elizabeth II Diamond Jubilee Medal, the Queen Elizabeth II Platinum Jubilee Medal, the King Charles III Coronation Medal, and the Accumulated Campaign Service Medal.

On 10 February 2017, Langston was appointed an Honorary Chaplain to The Queen (QHC).

Langston was appointed Companion of the Order of the Bath (CB) in the 2020 Birthday Honours.

Church of England titles
| Preceded by Peter Eagles | Archdeacon for the Army; 2017 to 2022 | Succeeded by Stephen Dunwoody |
Military offices
| Preceded by Peter Eagles | Deputy Chaplain General; 2017 to 2018 | Succeeded by Michael Fava |
| Preceded by David Coulter | Chaplain General; 2018 to 2022 | Succeeded by Michael Parker |
