= John Blackburn (priest) =

Anglican priest (1947–2021)

The Venerable John Blackburn CB QHC
- Chaplain General of the Royal Army Chaplains' Department
- Church: Church of England; Church in Wales
- In office: 2000–2004
- Predecessor: Victor Dobbin
- Successor: David Wilkes
- Other post: Archdeacon for the Army (1999–2004)

Orders
- Ordination: 1971 (deacon); 1972 (priest)

Personal details
- Born: 3 December 1947
- Died: 1 October 2021 (aged 73)
- Denomination: Anglicanism
- Spouse: Anne Elisabeth Woodcock (m. 1970)
- Children: Two
- Education: St Michael's College, Llandaff; University College, Cardiff; Open University

John Blackburn, CB, QHC (3 December 1947 – 1 October 2021) was a British Anglican priest and chaplain. He served as Archdeacon for the Army from 1999 to 2004 and Chaplain General of the Royal Army Chaplains' Department from 2000 to 2004. Before and after his service in the British Army, he was a parish priest in the Diocese of Monmouth of the Church in Wales.

== Early life and education ==
Blackburn was born on 3 December 1947 in Newport, Gwent, Wales. His father served in Merchant Navy and his mother managed a tailoring shop. He passed the 11-plus, and was educated in the grammar stream of Hartridge High School, Newport.

In 1966, he entered St Michael's College, Llandaff, an Anglican theological college, to study theology and train for ordained ministry. During this time, he completed a Diploma of Theology (DipTh) at University College, Cardiff, and a Diploma in Pastoral Studies (DPS) at St Michael's. Throughout his career, he continued his university studies. He graduated from the Open University, a university that specialises in part-time distance learning, with a Bachelor of Arts (BA) degree in 1988 and a Bachelor of Science (BSc) degree in 2004.

== Ordained ministry ==
Blackburn was ordained in the Church in Wales as a deacon in 1971 and as a priest in 1972. From 1971 to 1976, he served his curacy at St Mary's Church, Risca in the Diocese of Monmouth. On 18 May 1973, he was commissioned into the Royal Army Chaplains' Department (RAChD), Territorial and Army Volunteer Reserve, as a Chaplain to the Forces 4th Class (equivalent in rank to captain); this meant that he served as a part-time military chaplain in addition to his parish ministry. He was assigned to the Worcestershire and Sherwood Foresters Regiment.

Blackburn's part-time military chaplaincy had shown him the direction he wished to take his career. On 30 January 1976, he was granted a short service commission in the British Army thereby beginning his service as a full-time military chaplain. On 30 January 1981, he transferred to a regular commission. He was promoted to Chaplain to the Forces 3rd Class (equivalent in rank to major) on 30 January 1982, and to Chaplain to the Forces 2nd Class on 1 January 1990 (equivalent in rank to lieutenant colonel). In 1995, he was appointed Assistant Chaplain-General West and Wales, attached to the 5th Division. Then, from 1997, he was Assistant Chaplain-General of the 2nd Division, based in York.

On 10 May 1999, Blackburn was appointed Deputy Chaplain General and promoted to brigadier. As the most senior Anglican chaplain in the RAChD, he was appointed the Archdeacon for the Army in the Church of England in 1999. On 13 May 2000, he was appointed Chaplain General and promoted to major general. From 2001 to 2004, he was also an honorary canon of Ripon Cathedral; he was made canon emeritus in 2004. His greatest achievement as chaplain general was to turn the department into a true ecumenical partnership, with all denominations under one administrative authority: the Creedy Report of 1921 had suggested such a union but the Catholic Church had resisted and so there had been two divisions in the department, one Catholic and one Protestant. He retired from the British Army on 30 July 2004.

After leaving the military, Blackburn returned to the Diocese of Monmouth. From 2004 to 2013, he was Vicar of St Mary's Church, Risca; this was the same parish where he had served his curacy three decades earlier. He retired from full-time ministry on 15 July 2013. From 2014 until his death, he held permission to officiate in the Diocese of Swansea and Brecon.

== Personal life ==
In 1970, Blackburn married Anne Elisabeth Woodcock at Church of Our Lady and Saint Nicholas, Liverpool. Together they had two daughters.

Blackburn died on 1 October 2021, aged 73.

== Honours ==
On 30 September 1996, Blackburn was appointed an Honorary Chaplain to the Queen (QHC). In the 2004 New Year Honours, he was appointed Companion of the Order of the Bath (CB).
