= Michael Parker (minister) =

British Methodist Minister and military chaplain

The Reverend Michael Parker KHC
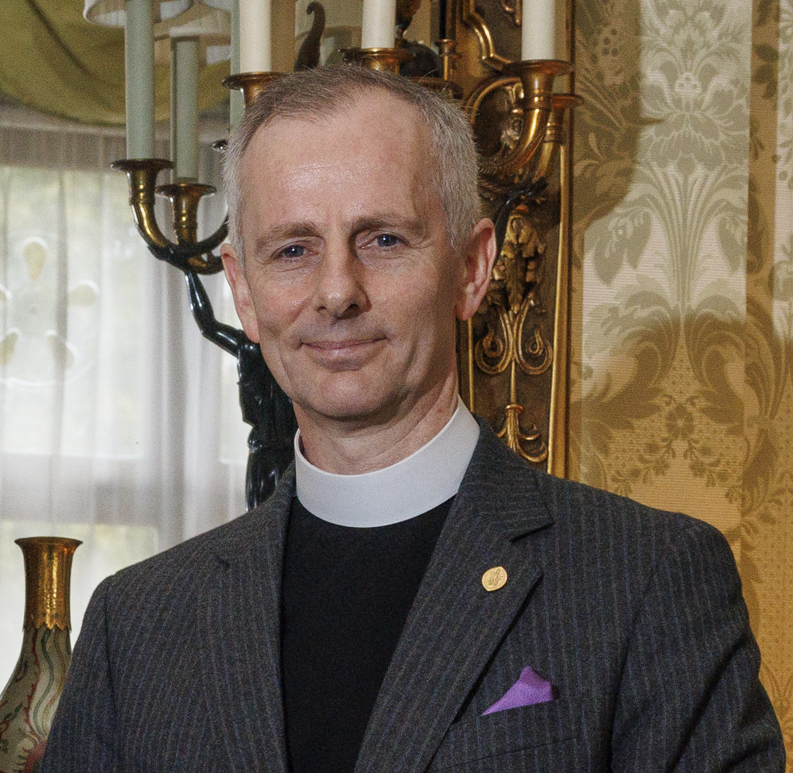
- Parker in 2023
- Military career
- Allegiance: United Kingdom
- Branch: British Army
- Service years: 2000–present
- Rank: Chaplain-general
- Commands: Royal Army Chaplains' Department
- Conflicts: Iraq War; War in Afghanistan

Michael David Parker KHC is a British Methodist minister and military chaplain. He is the current Chaplain-General to His Majesty's Land Forces.

== Early life ==
Parker was born in Cornwall, England. He studied theology at the University of Birmingham and trained for ordination at The Queen's Foundation, an ecumenical theological college. Having been ordained as a Methodist minister, he worked in the Colchester Circuit for four years.

== Military career ==
On 8 May 2000, Parker was commissioned into the Royal Army Chaplains' Department, British Army, as a Chaplain to the Forces 4th Class. He was promoted to Chaplain to the Forces 3rd Class on 8 May 2006, and to Chaplain to the Forces 2nd Class on 23 April 2012. He served as chaplain to 4th Regiment Royal Artillery; 2nd Battalion, Princess of Wales's Royal Regiment; 1st Battalion, Royal Welch Fusiliers; 1st Battalion, Royal Regiment of Fusiliers; and 1st Battalion, Parachute Regiment. He undertook operational tours to Northern Ireland, Iraq and Afghanistan.

He attended the Advanced Command and Staff Course in 2013. He was promoted to Chaplain to the Forces 1st Class on 30 June 2017 with seniority in that rank from the same date. He then served as assistant chaplain general of the 3rd (United Kingdom) Division.

Parker was appointed Deputy Chaplain-General to the Army in September 2020 and Chaplain-General to Her Majesty's Land Forces on 8 May 2022. On 4 May 2023, he was made a Sarum Canon (i.e. honorary canon) of Salisbury Cathedral.

Military offices
Preceded by Michael Fava	Deputy Chaplain General; 2020 to 2022	Succeeded by David Barratt
Preceded by Clinton Langston	Chaplain General; 2022 to Present	Incumbent
