= Theodore Hardy =

British military chaplain (1863–1918)

The Reverend Theodore Bayley Hardy VC DSO MC KHC
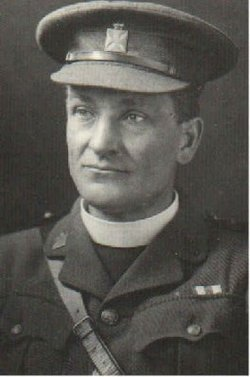
- Chaplain Theodore Hardy c. 1918
- Born: 20 October 1863; Exeter, England
- Died: 18 October 1918 (aged 54); Rouen, France
- Military career
- Allegiance: United Kingdom
- Branch: British Army
- Service years: 1916–1918
- Rank: Chaplain to the Forces 4th Class
- Units: Army Chaplains' Department
- Conflicts: First World War
- Awards: Victoria Cross; Distinguished Service Order; Military Cross; Mentioned in Despatches

Theodore Bayley Hardy, VC, DSO, MC, KHC (20 October 1863 – 18 October 1918) was a British Army chaplain and a recipient of the Victoria Cross, the highest award for gallantry in the face of the enemy that can be awarded to British and Commonwealth forces. In addition to the VC, Hardy had been awarded the Distinguished Service Order and Military Cross, making him one of the most decorated non-combatants of the First World War.

== Early life ==
Hardy was born 20 October 1863 to George and Sarah Richards Hardy of Exeter. Hardy was educated at the Royal Commercial Travellers School, Pinner, Middlesex from 1872 to 1879, City of London School from 1879 to 1882 and at the University of London. He was ordained in 1898. He was an Assistant Master at Nottingham High School from 1891 to 1907, teaching D. H. Lawrence; a Junior School house there is named in his honour. From 1907 to 1913, Hardy was headmaster of Bentham Grammar School in West Yorkshire. He was married to Florence Elizabeth Hastings, with whom he had a son and daughter. Mrs Hardy died after a year of illness in 1914.

Theodore Hardy was teetotal and a vegetarian.

== First World War ==
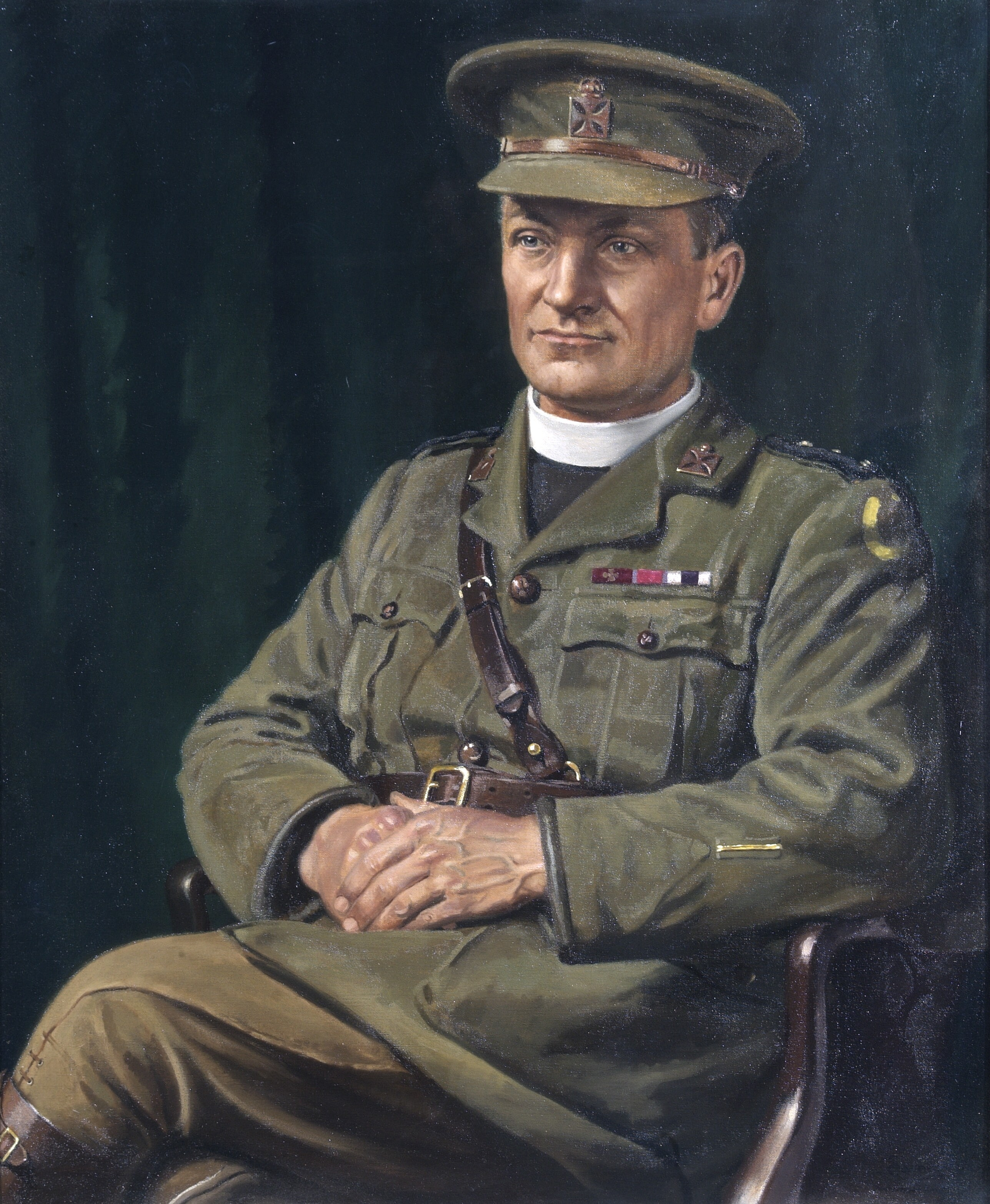
Posthumous portrait (1919) by Howard Somerville

Hardy was aged 51 when war broke out, and was priest at Hutton Roof in the Lake District. He volunteered at once but was turned down as being too old. Eventually, in August 1916, he was accepted for army service as a Temporary Chaplain to the Forces, 4th Class and attached to 8th Battalion, The Lincolnshire Regiment. He carried out the following deeds for which he was awarded a series of decorations. First he was awarded the Distinguished Service Order (DSO) on 18 October 1917, the full citation was published on 7 March 1918:

Rev. Theodore Bayley Hardy, A. Chaplns. Dept. For conspicuous gallantry and devotion to duty in volunteering to go with a rescue party for some men who had been left stuck in the mud the previous night between the enemy's outpost line and our own. All the men except one were brought in. He then organised a party for the rescue of this man, and remained with it all night, though under rifle-fire at close range, which killed one of the party. With his left arm in splints, owing to a broken wrist, and under the worst weather conditions, he crawled out with patrols to within seventy yards of the enemy and remained with wounded men under heavy fire.

— London Gazette

This was followed by the Military Cross (MC) on 17 December 1917, the citation following on 23 April 1918:

Rev, Theodore Bayley Hardy, D.S.O., A., Chapln.'s Dept. For conspicuous gallantry and devotion to duty in tending the wounded. The ground on which he worked was constantly shelled and the casualties were heavy. He continually assisted in finding and carrying wounded and in guiding stretcher bearers to the aid post.

— London Gazette

Finally came the VC on 7 July 1918:

Reverend Theodore Bayley Hardy, D.S.O., M.C., T./C.F., 4th Class, A. Chapl. Dept., attd. Lincs. R.

For most conspicuous bravery and devotion to duty on many occasions. Although over fifty years of age, he has, by his fearlessness, devotion to men of his battalion, and quiet, unobtrusive manner, won the respect and admiration of the whole division. His marvellous energy and endurance would be remarkable even in a very much younger man, and his valour and devotion are exemplified in the following incidents: —

An infantry patrol had gone out to attack a previously located enemy post in the ruins of a village, the Reverend Theodore Bayley Hardy (C.F.) being then at company headquarters. Hearing firing, he followed the patrol, and about four hundred yards beyond our front line of posts found an officer of the patrol dangerously wounded. He remained with the officer until he was able to get assistance to bring him in. During this time there was a great deal of firing, and an enemy patrol actually penetrated between the spot at which the officer was lying and our front line and captured three of our men.

On a second occasion, when an enemy shell exploded in the middle of one of our posts, the Reverend T. B. Hardy at once made his way to the spot, despite the shell and trench mortar fire which was going on at the time, and set to work to extricate the buried men. He succeeded in getting out one man who had been completely buried. He then set to work to extricate a second man, who was found to be dead.

During the whole of the time that he was digging out the men this chaplain was in great danger, not only from shell fire, but also because of the dangerous condition of the wall of the building which had been hit by the shell which buried the men.

On a third occasion he displayed the greatest devotion to duty when our infantry, after a successful attack, were gradually forced back to their starting trench.

After it was believed that all our men had withdrawn from the wood, Chaplain Hardy came out of it, and on reaching an advanced post asked the men to help him to get in a wounded man. Accompanied by a serjeant, he made his way to the spot where the man lay, within ten yards of a pill-box which had been captured in the morning, but was subsequently recaptured and occupied by the enemy. The wounded man was too weak to stand, but between them the chaplain and the serjeant eventually succeeded in getting him to our lines.

Throughout the day the enemy's artillery, machine-gun, and trench mortar fire was continuous, and caused many casualties.

Notwithstanding, this very gallant chaplain was seen moving quietly amongst the men and tending the wounded, absolutely regardless of his personal safety.

— London Gazette

Hardy was appointed to the honorary position of Chaplain to His Majesty on 17 September 1918.

== Death ==
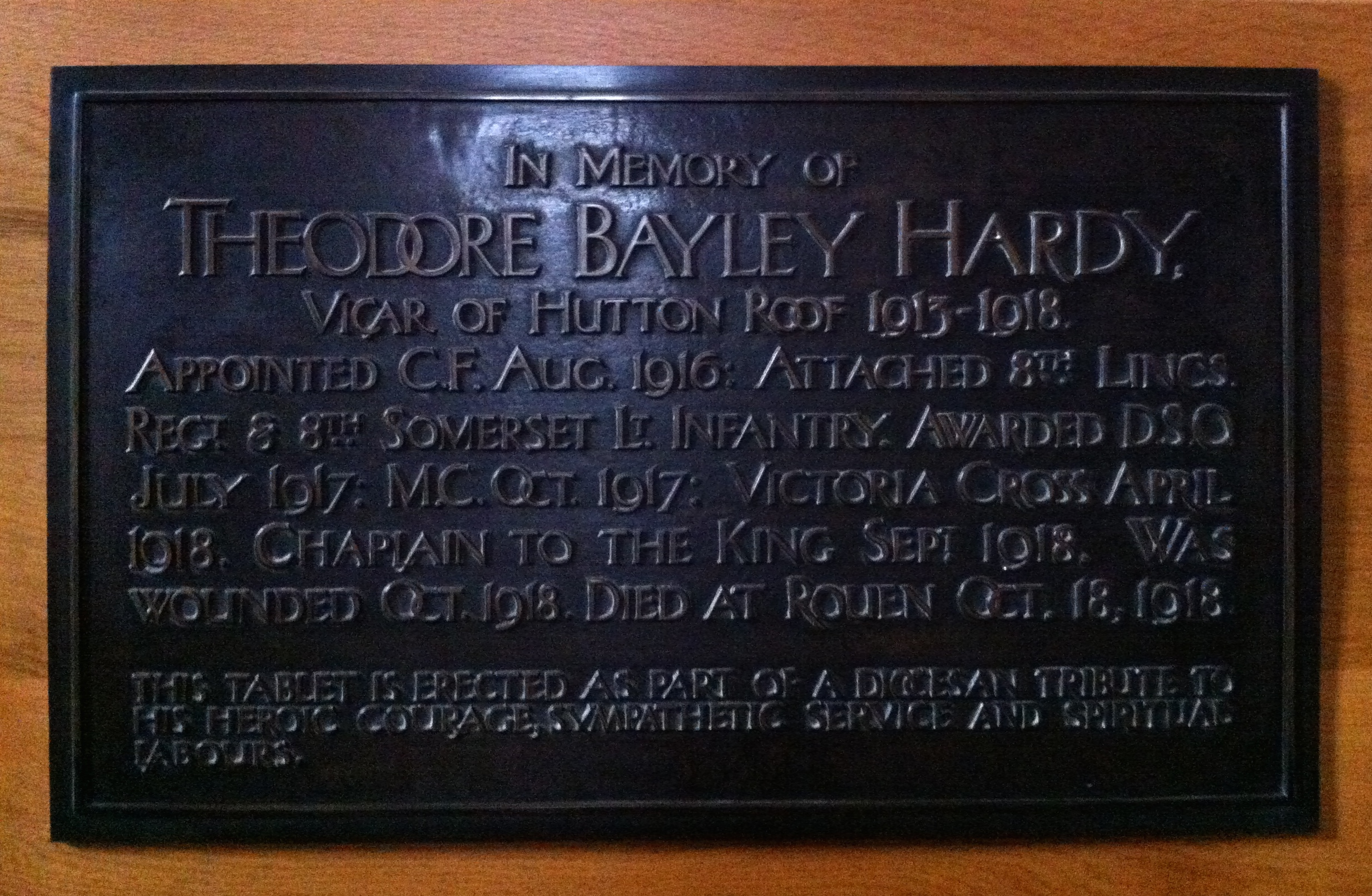
Memorial in Carlisle Cathedral

He was wounded in action when again trying to tend to the wounded and died a week later in Rouen, France, on 18 October 1918, two days before his 55th birthday.

He was buried at St. Sever Cemetery Extension, Rouen, France, in block S, plot V, row J, grave 1. There are memorials to Hardy at Carlisle Cathedral, at the former Royal Commercial Travellers School, Pinner, Middlesex (now the Harrow Arts Centre), City of London School, in his old church at Hutton Roof in Cumbria and a memorial tablet at the Exeter War Memorial in Northernhay Gardens.

His medals are displayed at Royal Army Chaplains' Museum in Shrivenham, Oxfordshire.
