= Cox Edghill =

British priest and military chaplain

John Cox Edghill was a British Anglican priest and military chaplain. He was senior chaplain at Aldershot from 1861, then followed chaplain to the forces at Chatham, Halifax (Nova Scotia), again at Aldershot, Gibraltar, and, finally, at Portsmouth (1881–1885), and then Chaplain-General to Her Majesty's Forces (1885–1901). He was also Chaplain of the Tower of London until he resigned in October 1902. Following his retirement, he held the position of Prebendary of Wells, which he held until his death.

As a noted Tractarian and Anglo-Catholic, he was the first choice to replace Hibbert Binney as the bishop of Nova Scotia by the Synod of the diocese, at Halifax, 6 June 1887. He declined his election in a letter to the Synod.

He was an Honorary Chaplain to King Edward VII.

He had a daughter, Ella Mary Edghill, with Mary Nesfield (d. 24 September 1922, Weston-super-Mare).

The Museum of Army Chaplaincy holds further information on the life on Edghill.

== Bibliography ==
- Letter from Rev. J.C. Edghill, D.D., Chaplain-general, to the Synod of Nova Scotia (1887)
- The work of the Church in the army (1890)
