= Victor Dobbin =

Irish Presbyterian minister

Victor Dobbin, CB, MBE, QHC (born 12 March 1943) is a retired minister of the Presbyterian Church in Ireland.

Born in 1943, he was educated at Trinity College, Dublin (MA) and Queen's University Belfast (MTh, PhD). He was Assistant Minister at Rosemary Presbyterian Church, Belfast (1970–72), when he joined the Royal Army Chaplains Department rising in time to be its Chaplain-General (1995–2000).

He was deputy warden of the RAChD Centre (1982–86), senior chaplain 3rd Armoured Division 1986–89, staff chaplain British Army of the Rhine (1989–91), Assistant Chaplain-General Southern District (1991–95), Chaplain-General (1995–2000); director Leadership and Ethics Centre (2002–12). He was awarded the Churchill Fellowship (in 2000) and awarded an honorary Doctor of Divinity from the Presbyterian Theological Faculty in Ireland (in 1995). An Honorary Chaplain to the Queen, he retired in 2000.

Church of England titles
Preceded by James Harkness	Chaplain-General to the Forces; 1995–2000	Succeeded by John Blackburn
