= Graham Roblin =

Former Archdeacon of the Army and Deputy Chaplain General in the British Armed Forces

Graham Henry Roblin OBE QHC AKC (18 August 1937 – 4 December 2005) was the Archdeacon of the Army and Deputy Chaplain General to the Forces from 1989 to 1993.

Roblin was educated at King's College, Taunton and King's College London and ordained in 1963. After a curacy at St Helier, Southwark he was with the Royal Army Chaplains' Department from 1966 to 1993. He was also an Honorary Chaplain to the Queen from 1987 to 1993; and Vicar of Bere Regis from 1993 to 2001.
