= Alan Dean (priest) =

Alan Dean (1938–2018) was Archdeacon of the Army and Deputy Chaplain General to the Forces from 1993 to 1995.

Dean was educated at the University of Hull and ordained in 1964. After a curacy at Clitheroe and then Chaplain to the Bishop of Burnley he was with the Royal Army Chaplains' Department from 1968 to 1995. He was also an Honorary Chaplain to the Queen from 1987 to 1993.
