= Tom Robinson (priest) =

Thomas Hugh Robinson CBE QHC (11 June 1934 – 26 August 2007) was Archdeacon of the Army and Deputy Chaplain General to the Forces from 1986 to 1989.

Robinson was born in Murree, educated at Trinity College, Dublin and ordained in 1958. After a curacy at St Clement, Belfast he was Chaplain to the Missions to Seamen in Mombasa from 1961 to 1964. He was Rector of Youghal from 1964 to 1966. He served with the Royal Army Chaplains' Department from 1966 to 1989. He was also an Honorary Chaplain to the Queen from 1985 to 1989; and Team Rector of Cleethorpes from 1990 to 1998.
