= William Addison (VC) =

Recipient of the Victoria Cross

William Robert Fountaine Addison
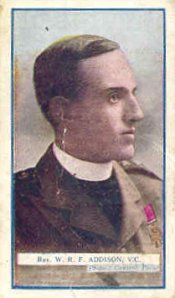
- Born: 16 September 1883; North Warnborough, Hampshire
- Died: 7 January 1962 (aged 78); St Leonards-on-Sea, Sussex
- Burial place: Brookwood Cemetery; 51.298319°N 0.626347°W
- Military career
- Allegiance: United Kingdom
- Branch: British Army
- Service years: 1914–1938; 1939–1942
- Rank: Chaplain
- Units: Army Chaplain's Department
- Conflicts: First World War: Middle Eastern theatre; Mesopotamian campaign; Second World War
- Awards: Victoria Cross; Order of St. George IV class (Russia)

William Robert Fountaine Addison (18 September 1883 – 7 January 1962) was an English Anglican priest and army chaplain. He was a recipient of the Victoria Cross, the highest and most prestigious award for gallantry in the face of the enemy that can be awarded to British and Commonwealth forces.

== Early life ==
William Addison was born in North Warnborough, Hampshire, on 18 September 1883 to William Grylis Addison and Alice Addison. He was educated at Odiham Grammar School, Odiham, Hants. The family moved to Kent when he was 13, leading British government authorities to believe he had been born in Kent until the error was revealed by the chair of the Odiham branch of the Royal British Legion. After his father's death in 1904, he moved to Canada, where he worked as a farmer and a lumberjack. He returned to England in 1909 and became a farmer in Devon, saving up money to train for the priesthood. He entered Salisbury Theological College in 1911, and was admitted as a student in theology at Durham University (to which Salisbury was an associated theological college) in Easter term 1912, passing the first year examination in theology in the same term. He was ordained at Salisbury Cathedral in May 1913 and became curate of St Edmund's Church, Salisbury (now closed).

== First World War ==
Upon the outbreak of First World War, he volunteered for the Army Chaplain's Department. He became a Temporary Chaplain of the Forces, 4th Class in the Army Chaplain's Department, British Army, and was 32 years old when the deed took place on 9 April 1916 at Sanna-i-Yat, Mesopotamia, for which he was awarded the VC "for most conspicuous bravery":

He carried a wounded man to the cover of a trench, and assisted several others to the same cover, after binding up their wounds under heavy rifle and machine gun fire.
In addition to these unaided efforts, by his splendid example and utter disregard of personal danger, he encouraged the stretcher-bearers to go forward under heavy fire and collect the wounded.

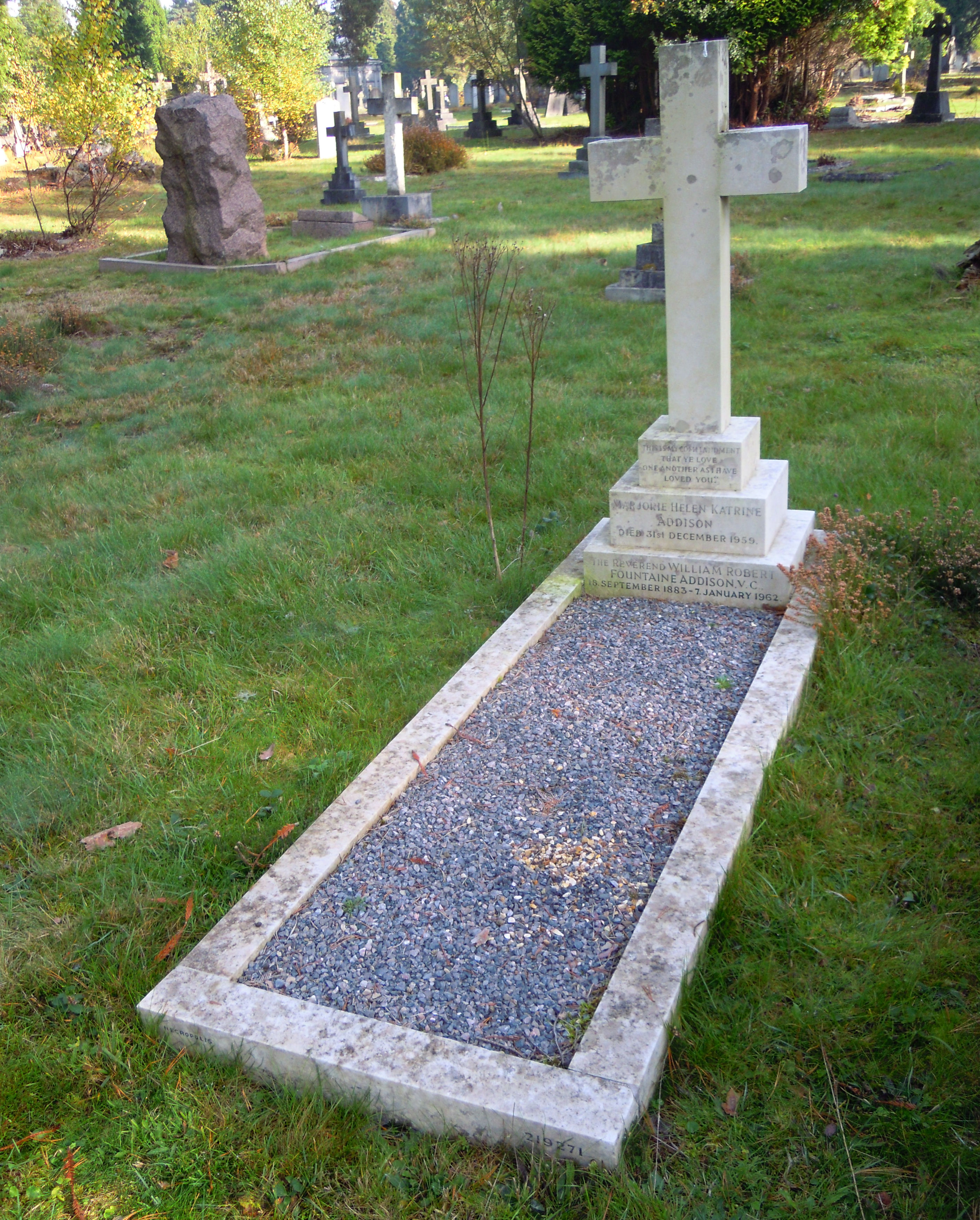
Addison's grave in Brookwood Cemetery

== Later life ==
Addison was a Freemason and was initiated into Aldershot Camp Lodge No. 1331 on 14 November 1923.

After the war, he continued as an army chaplain and served at Malta, Khartoum and Shanghai and at army bases in England. He was Senior Chaplain to the Forces from 1934 to 1938, when he left the army and became a parish priest. He was rector of Coltishall with Great Hautbois in Norfolk from 1938 to 1958. On the outbreak of World War II he returned to the army and again served as Senior Chaplain to the Forces. He died in St Leonards-on-Sea, East Sussex, and is buried in Brookwood Cemetery in Surrey.

A replica set of Addison's medals is on display at the Museum of Army Chaplaincy, and at Sarum College in Salisbury.

== Bibliography ==
- Buzzell, Nora, ed. (1997). The Register of the Victoria Cross. Cheltenham, Gloucestershire: This England Alma House. ISBN 0-906324-27-0.
- Gliddon, Gerald (2005). The Sideshows. VCs of the First World War. Stroud, Gloucestershire: Sutton Publishing. ISBN 978-0-7509-2084-1.
