= J. Edwin Lloyd =

Liberian politician (died 2023)

J. Edwin Lloyd Sr. (died 6 May 2023) was a Liberian cleric and military officer. He served as chief military cleric in 1979.

== Early life ==
Lloyd received his undergraduate education in Theology at the Liberian Baptist Theological Seminary. He earned a Master of Divinity and a Doctor of Philosophy in Religious Studies from Breakthrough Bible College of Oral Roberts University. He was ordained as a Baptist minister in 1976.

== Career ==
Lloyd was a 20-year veteran of the Armed Forces of Liberia (AFL) who trained in the United States and North Africa. He was Quartermaster general of the AFL (1975–1979), and Chaplain General of the AFL (1979–1980), and subsequently the first Director-General of the Bureau of Veterans Affairs.

After his military career, Lloyd was special representative of the International Red Cross to famine-stricken regions of Ethiopia and Sudan (1985–1986), after which he was elected president of the Liberian National Red Cross Society (LNRCS) (1986–1990). He was also a former executive of the Family Planning Association of Liberia (FPAL), as well as a founder and former Treasurer of the "Group of 77" which caters to the handicapped.

In 1990, he set up the HUB Ministries, International which established the Union Baptist Center - the first multifaceted refugee center in the Ivory Coast offering relief services to thousands of Liberian refugees during the First Liberian Civil War. As president and executive director of HUB (1990–2007), Lloyd established offices across the Ivory Coast and the United States and sought relief for more than 200,000 Liberian refugees.

Lloyd was a leading voice within the Liberian clergy, and a leading cleric within the Liberian Baptist arena, where he was formerly the chairman of the Providence Baptist Association (PBC), and president of the Liberian Baptist Sunday School Convention. He was chairman of the board of directors of HUB Ministries International and senior pastor of Hopeful Baptist Church in Schiefflin, Liberia, where he had served since 1978.
