= John Gamble =

John Gamble may refer to:

- John Gamble (musician) (died 1687), musician and song collector
- John Gamble (priest) (1762–1811), British Anglican clergyman and military chaplain
- John M. Gamble (1791–1836), officer in the United States Marine Corps
- John William Gamble (1799–1873), businessman and political figure in Upper Canada and Canada West
- John Rankin Gamble (1848–1891), U.S. Representative from South Dakota
- John Marshall Gamble (1863–1957), American painter
- John A. Gamble (1933–2009), Canadian politician
- John Gamble (baseball) (1948–2022), Major League Baseball shortstop
- John Gamble (American football) (active 1981–2012), American football player, powerlifter and strongman competitor
- John Gamble (record producer) (1960–2020), American record producer

== See also ==
- John Gamble Kirkwood (1907–1959), scientist
