= Reverend Green =

Reverend Green may refer to:

== People ==
- Jacob Green (pastor) (1722–1790), American Presbyterian pastor and acting president of Princeton University
- Thomas Green (pastor) (1761–1814), American Baptist minister
- Ashbel Green (1762–1848), American Presbyterian minister
- Samuel Green (freedman) (1802–1877), American lay minister
- Lewis W. Green (1806–1883), American Presbyterian minister who served as president of three universities
- John Richard Green (1837–1883), English Anglican clergyman and historian
- Charles Green (bishop) (1864–1944), Welsh Anglican bishop
- Edmund Tyrrell Green (1864–1937), English Anglican curate
- George Green (chaplain) (1881–1956), Australian Anglican clergyman and army chaplain
- Samuel Green (priest) (1882–1929), British Anglican priest and Army chaplain
- Fred Pratt Green (1903–2000), British Methodist minister
- Vivian H. H. Green (1915–2005), British Anglican priest and rector of Lincoln College, Oxford
- Michael Green (theologian) (1930–2019), British Anglican priest and theologian
- Laurie Green (born 1945), British Anglican bishop
- Stephen Green, Baron Green of Hurstpierpoint (born 1948), British politician and Anglican priest
- Al Green (born 1956), American singer and pastor

== Fictional characters ==
- Reverend Green (Cluedo), from the board game Cluedo
- Reverend Green (Hollyoaks), from the television series Hollyoaks
- Trevor "The Reverend" Green, from the 2013 film The World's End
