= John Holliman (priest) =

British priest (1944–2017)

John James Holliman (1944 – 4 March 2017) was Archdeacon of the Army and Deputy Chaplain General to the Forces from 1996 to 1999.

Holliman was educated at St David's College, Lampeter and ordained in 1968. After a curacy at Tideswell he was with the Royal Army Chaplains' Department from 1971 to 1999. He was also an Honorary Chaplain to the Queen from 1994 to 1999; and Vicar of Funtington from 1999 to 2009.

He died on 4 March 2017.
