= Samuel Green =

Samuel Green may refer to:

- Samuel Green (printer) (1614–1702), American printer
- Samuel Green (organ builder) (1740–1796), English organ builder
- Samuel Green (criminal) (1796–1822), American serial killer and robber
- Samuel Green (freedman) (c. 1802–1877), American freed slave, jailed in 1857 for possessing a copy of the novel Uncle Tom's Cabin
- Samuel Swett Green (1837–1918), founder of the American Library Association
- Samuel Green (Klansman) (1890–1949), Ku Klux Klan leader in the 1940s
- Samuel Green (poet) (born 1948), Poet Laureate, 2007-9, of the State of Washington
- Samuel Green (politician) South Carolina Representative and Senator
- Samuel Abbott Green (1830–1919), mayor of Boston
- Samuel Adams Green (1940–2011), art director
- Samuel Fisk Green (1822–1884), American medical missionary
- Samuel Gosnell Green (1822–1905), English Baptist minister and author
- Samuel Green (priest) (1882–1929), British Army chaplain
- Samuel L. Green Jr. (1927–2016), pastor and bishop in the Church of God in Christ
- Sam Green, documentary filmmaker
- Sam Green (councillor) (1941–1999), an openly-gay man elected to Durham City Council in 1972
- Sam Green (born 1947), pseudonym for Juval Aviv, novelist

== See also ==
- Samuel Greene (disambiguation)
