= 2005 Special Honours =

British government recognitions

As part of the British honours system, the Special Honours are issued at the Monarch's pleasure at any given time. The Special Honours confer the award of the Order of the Garter, Order of the Thistle, Order of Merit, Royal Victorian Order and the Order of St John. Life Peers are at times also awarded as special honours.

== Royal Victorian Order ==
=== Knight Grand Cross (GCVO) ===
- Lieutenant Colonel Sir (Walter Hugh) Malcolm Ross, KCVO, OBE, upon the relinquishment of his appointment as Comptroller of the Lord Chamberlain’s Office.

=== Knight Commander (KCVO) ===
- The Very Reverend James Harkness, CB, OBE, upon the relinquishment of his appointment as Dean of the Chapel Royal, Scotland.
