= James Harkness (minister) =

Scottish Presbyterian minister (1935–2026)

James Harkness KCVO CB OBE KStJ QHC FRSA (20 October 1935 – 20 August 2026) was a Scottish Presbyterian minister. He was Moderator of the General Assembly of the Church of Scotland from 1995 to 1996.

== Early life and ordained ministry ==
Harkness was born in Thornhill, Dumfries and Galloway on 20 October 1935, a son of James Harkness and Jane McMorn. He was educated at Morton and Dumfries Academy (1941–1954). He then studied at the University of Edinburgh (1954–1960).

He became a student assistant minister at St George's Edinburgh (1959–60) and was at North Morningside in Edinurgh (1958–1961).

Harkness was ordained on 21 June 1961 and became assistant minister at North Morningside in Edinburgh.

He joined the Royal Army Chaplains' Department (RAChD) in 1961 and served four years with the King's Own Scottish Borderers and four years with the Queen's Own Highlanders. He was in Singapore between 1969 and 1970 and then deputy warden of the RAChD Centre until 1974. He was then senior chaplain in Northern Ireland (1974–75) and then the 4th Division (1975–1978).

Harkness was assistant chaplain general in Scotland (1980–1981), senior chaplain to the 1st British Corps (1981–82) and to the BAOR (1982–1984). In 1985 he became deputy chaplain general to the British Armed Forces after which he was chaplain general (1987 to 1995) – the first non-Anglican appointment. He retired from chaplaincy ministry in 1995.

Harkness was Moderator of the General Assembly of the Church of Scotland from 1995 to 1996.

In 1996, he became Dean of the Chapel Royal in Scotland, a post he held for a decade. An Honorary Chaplain to the Queen in Scotland from 1996, he had been dean to the Venerable Order of St John from 2005. He was also appointed an officer of the order in December 1988 and Knight of the Venerable Order of St John in January 2012.

Upon the death of James Simpson in May 2024, Harkness became the oldest surviving former moderator of the General Assembly, as well as the earliest in post, with John Cairns being the only other moderator to serve before 2000 who was still living.

== Personal life and death ==
On 9 June 1960, Harkness married Elizabeth Anne Tolmie (born 1936). They had two children, daughter Lindsay, born 1962, and son Paul, born 1965. He and his wife lived in Thornhill where he was born.

Harkness had been ill for a lengthy period. His final months were spent in hospital in Dumfries, where he died on 20 August 2026 aged 90.

Religious titles
Preceded by William Francis Johnston	Chaplain-General to the Forces; 1987–1995	Succeeded by Victor Dobbin
Preceded by James Alexander Simpson	Moderator of the General Assembly of the Church of Scotland; 1995–1996	Succeeded by John Hedley McIndoe
Preceded by William James Morris	Dean of the Chapel Royal in Scotland; 1996–2006	Succeeded by John Ballantyne Cairns
