= John Gamble (priest) =

John Gamble (1762–1811) was a British Anglican clergyman and military chaplain. From 1796 to 1810, he served as the first Chaplain General to the Forces and head of the Army Chaplains' Department.

Gamble was educated at Pembroke College, Cambridge, graduating B.A. 1784, M.A. 1787, and becoming a Fellow of the college, He was chaplain to the Duke of York and Albany, and became chaplain-general of the forces. He was rector of Alphamstone, and of Bradwell-juxta-mare in Essex. He died at Knightsbridge on 27 July 1811. He was minister of Knightsbridge's Trinity Chapel, and had resided there, at 3 South Place, from 1801.

In 1795 Gamble published a pamphlet Observations on Telegraphic Experiments, or the different Modes which have been or may be adopted for the purpose of Distant Communication. He followed it with Essay on the different Modes of Communication by Signals (1797). He is credited with the invention at this period of a six-arm semaphore.
