= Jonathan Woodhouse (minister) =

British minister (born 1955)

The Reverend Jonathan Woodhouse CB QHC
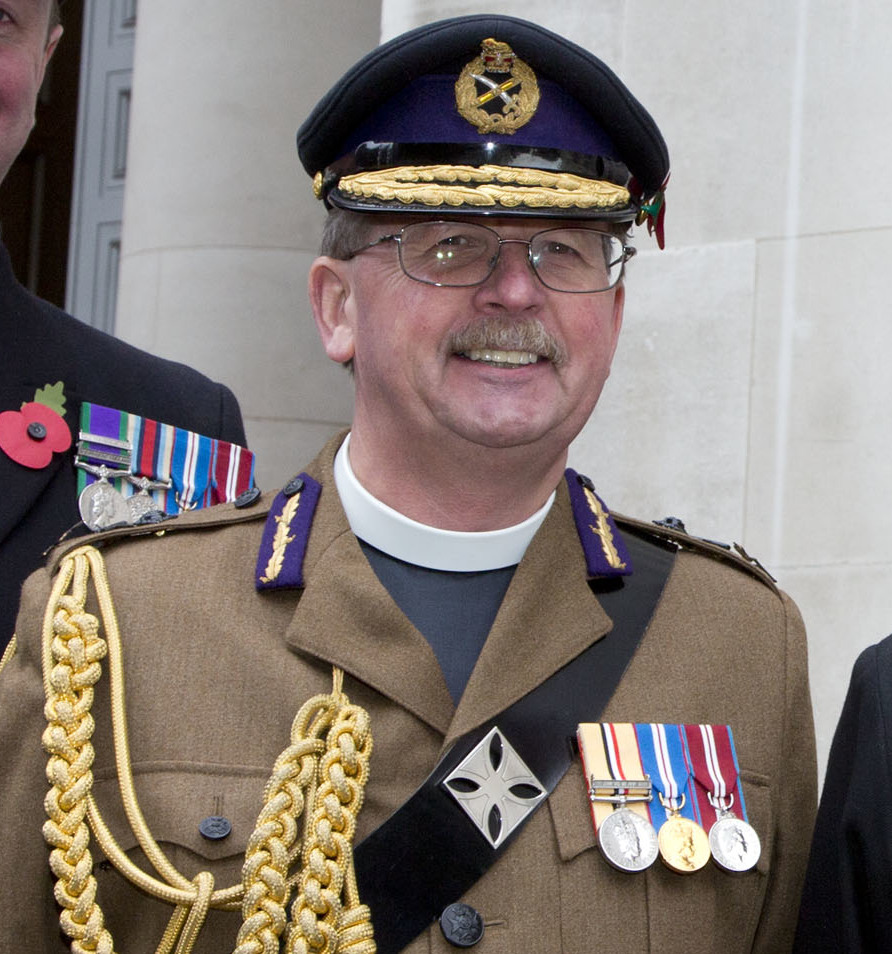
- Woodhouse in 2013
- Born: 29 March 1955 (age 71); Cardiff, Wales
- Military career
- Allegiance: United Kingdom
- Branch: British Army
- Service years: 1990–2014
- Rank: Major-General
- Service number: 534661
- Commands: Royal Army Chaplains' Department
- Conflicts: Cold War; Iraq War

Jonathan Woodhouse, CB, QHC (born 29 March 1955) is a British Baptist minister and retired senior British Army officer. He was Chaplain General and head of the Royal Army Chaplains' Department from 2011 to 2014. He is the first Baptist and the second member of the Free Churches to become Chaplain General.

== Early life and education ==
Woodhouse was born on 29 March 1955 in Cardiff, Wales. He was educated at Whitchurch Grammar School, a state grammar school in Whitchurch, Cardiff. He studied at the London School of Theology a theological college in Northwood, London, graduating Bachelor of Arts (BA).

== Ordained ministry ==
Woodhouse was ordained as a Baptist minister in 1980. He served as a minister in Eastbourne, East Sussex and at Selsdon Baptist Church in Croydon, London.

=== Military career ===
On 8 May 1990, Woodhouse was commissioned into the Royal Army Chaplains' Department, British Army, as a Chaplain to the Forces 4th Class (equivalent in rank to captain but lacking executive authority). He transferred from a short service commission to a regular commission on 8 May 1995. On 8 May 1996, he was promoted to Chaplain to the Forces 3rd Class (equivalent in rank to major). He was promoted to Chaplain to the Forces 2nd Class (equivalent in rank to lieutenant colonel) on 30 October 2002. In March 2003, he was posted to Iraq as part of the invasion force at the beginning of the Iraq War. In July 2005, he was appointed the senior chaplain at the Royal Military Academy Sandhurst.

On 1 January 2006, he was appointed Denominational Representative Chaplain of the United Board. The United Board is a special grouping of the Baptist Union of Great Britain, the United Reformed Church and the Congregational Federation for the purpose of providing military chaplains. He was promoted to Chaplain to the Forces 1st Class (equivalent in rank to colonel) on 2 May 2006. On 2 May 2008 he was appointed Deputy Chaplain General and the granted the rank of brigadier. On 29 July 2011, he was appointed Chaplain General to Her Majesty's Land Forces and promoted to the rank of major general.

Woodhouse has seen active service, working on the frontline in Iraq during the 2003 to 2011 war. He has also completed overseas postings to Germany.

=== Later career ===
In 2015, Woodhouse served as Convenor of the United Navy, Army and Air Force Board: it "is responsible for [recommending] ordained ministers from Baptist, URC, Congregational, Elim and Assemblies of God denominations to serve in the chaplaincies of the Royal Navy, Army or Royal Air Force". Since 2015, he has been a chaplain at Moorlands College, a non-denominational evangelical theological college in Hampshire.

== Honours and decorations ==

On 1 August 2008, Woodhouse was appointed Honorary Chaplain to the Queen (QHC). He was appointed Companion of the Order of the Bath (CB) in the 2014 Birthday Honours.

He is a recipient of the Iraq Medal, the Queen Elizabeth II Golden Jubilee Medal and the Queen Elizabeth II Diamond Jubilee Medal.
