= Samuel Greene =

Samuel, Sam, or Sammy Greene may refer to:

- Samuel Greene (naval officer) (1839–1884), United States Navy officer
- Samuel Harrison Greene (1845–1920), American Baptist pastor, church leader, and university official
- Samuel Thomas Greene (1843–1890), American educator of the deaf
- Samuel Stillman Greene (1810–1883), American educator
- Sam Greene (sportswriter) (1895–1963), American sportswriter
- Sam Greene (rugby union) (born 1994), Australian rugby union player
- Sam Greene (academic), professor in Russian politics
- Sammy Greene (born 1959), American football player

== See also ==
- Samuel Green (disambiguation)
