= James Simpson (minister) =

James A. Simpson (1934 - 30 May 2024) was a minister of the Church of Scotland. He was Moderator of the General Assembly of the Church of Scotland in 1994–95 - the first from a Highland parish since James Gunn Matheson (from Portree Parish Church on the Isle of Skye) in 1975.

== Early life ==
Simpson was born in Glasgow in 1934. He attended Eastwood High School in Newton Mearns.

After graduating from the University of Glasgow with first class honours in Mathematics and Physics, Simpson had contemplated a career studying atomic research. At the time, however, there were no vacancies at Harwell, which concentrated on developing peaceful uses of atomic power.

The only career opportunities were at the Atomic Weapons Establishment in Aldermaston, which specialised in developing nuclear weapons. Not wanting to spend his life in the manufacture of nuclear bombs, he chose to study Divinity at the University of Glasgow.

== Background and career ==
He was ordained on 21 September 1960. His ministry began in Grahamston Parish Church in Falkirk, followed by St. John's Renfield Church, Glasgow. In 1976 he was called to be the minister of Dornoch Cathedral in Dornoch, Sutherland, where he was to spend the next 21 years.

During his years there, he was awarded an honorary doctorate from Aberdeen University.

He was elected Moderator of the General Assembly of the Church of Scotland, serving from May 1994 to May 1995.

In 1997 he demitted his charge at Dornoch to become an "Interim Minister" for several years (helping congregations to working through periods of transition). His first post as an Interim Minister was Almondbank Tibbermore Church in Perthshire. This was followed by other periods at St Leonard's, Scone Old, Crieff, Bankfoot and Brechin Cathedral. He retired in 1999.

He was renowned as a popular after-dinner speaker and best-selling author. He was also known for his humorous books and regular column in the Church of Scotland's "Life and Work" magazine.

His title (following the end of his Moderatorial year) is the Very Reverend Dr James Alexander Simpson BSc BD STM DD. After the death of Hugh Wylie in October 2023, he became the oldest living and earliest surviving moderator. Upon his death in May 2024, both titles were taken by the Moderator who came immediately after Simpson, James Harkness.

In 1993, he was appointed chaplain in Scotland to Queen Elizabeth.

== Personal life and death ==
He had been married to Helen for 64 years. Together they had five children: Morag, Neil, Graeme, Alistair and Elaine; as well being survived by eight grandchildren (to whom he was called 'papa'), and two great-grandchildren. His eldest granddaughter, Sally, had died at the age of 27 having lived with the condition Cystic Fibrosis. Because of this, Simpson became a prolific fundraiser - with over £80,000 being raised by him towards research into curing the condition.

He was a keen golfer, having a low handicap. He was an honorary life member of Royal Dornoch Golf Club. He wrote a book, entitled "The Royal Dornoch Golf Club" about its history.

Dr Simpson died peacefully at his Bankfoot home near Perth – which he had named "Dornoch" - just a few weeks after celebrating his 90th birthday with family at a hotel in Perth.

At the Service of Thanksgiving, held at St Leonards in the Fields Church in Perth, former Moderator, Very Rev. Dr David Lacy, gave a reading and Dr Simpson's eldest son Neil gave a tribute on behalf of the family. Dr Simpson's son-in-law Derick Macaskill playing "Highland Cathedral" on the bagpipes. At the end of the funeral, retiring donations were invited for Cystic Fibrosis Research and Bankfoot Church Centre.

== See also ==
- List of moderators of the General Assembly of the Church of Scotland

Religious titles
Preceded by James L. Weatherhead	Moderator of the General Assembly of the Church of Scotland; 1994–1995	Succeeded by James Harkness
