= Michael Fava =

British Catholic priest

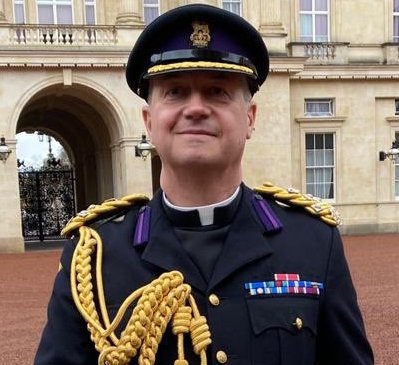
Fr Michael Fava in 2020

Michael Paul Dare Fava CBE QHC (born 1962) is a British Catholic priest and former British Army chaplain. From 2018 to 2020, he served as Deputy Chaplain General of the Royal Army Chaplains' Department: he is the first Roman Catholic to hold the post.

== Biography ==
Fava was born in 1962 in Kampala, Uganda, before moving to the United Kingdom in 1970. He was educated at Salesian College, Farnborough, an independent Catholic school. He studied theology at the University of Oxford and then pastoral theology at the University of London.

Fava entered the Order of Saint Benedict in 1980, and was ordained to the priesthood on 8 July 1989. He was commissioned into the British Army as a chaplain in 1997. In 2004, he moved from the Benedictines to become a secular priest affiliated with the Diocese of Portsmouth. He appointed Deputy Chaplain-General to Her Majesty's Land Forces Army in November 2018, and promoted to the rank of deputy chaplain general (equivalent to brigadier) on 30 June 2019.

On 5 July 2017, Fava was appointed an Honorary Chaplain to the Queen (QHC). He was appointed Commander of the Order of the British Empire (CBE) in the 2019 Birthday Honours.

Fava retired from the British Army on 30 October 2020. In late 2021, he joined St Joseph's Church, Newbury, Berkshire, in the Diocese of Portsmouth, as parish priest.

Fava has since been moved, as of 8 September 2026, to St Peter's Church, Winchester, Hampshire, as Parish Priest and Coordinating Pastor.

Military offices
Preceded by Clinton Langston	Deputy Chaplain General; 2018 to 2020	Succeeded by Michael Parker
