= David Coulter (minister) =

Major General The Reverend David Coulter CB OStJ QHC
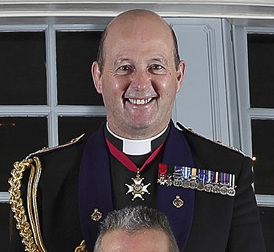
- Coulter in 2017
- Born: David George Coulter; 29 December 1957 (age 68); Belfast, Northern Ireland
- Military career
- Allegiance: United Kingdom
- Branch: British Army
- Service years: 1979–2019
- Rank: Major General
- Units: Royal Irish Rangers; Royal Army Chaplains' Department
- Commands: Armed Forces Chaplaincy Centre
- Conflicts: The Troubles; Gulf War
- Awards: Honorary Chaplain to the Queen (2007); Companion of the Order of the Bath (2016); Officer of the Venerable Order of St John (2017)

David George Coulter, CB, OStJ, QHC (born 29 December 1957) is a Church of Scotland minister and former military chaplain. From 2014 to 2018, he served as Chaplain General and head of the Royal Army Chaplains' Department, British Army. He was previously Principal of the Armed Forces Chaplaincy Centre and Deputy Chaplain General.

== Early life and education ==
Coulter was born on 29 December 1957 in Belfast, Northern Ireland. He grew up in Dundonald, and attended Dundonald Presbyterian Church. He was educated at Regent House School, a state grammar school in Newtownards, County Down. Having won a scholarship from the British Army, he studied economic and social history at Queen's University Belfast and was a member of its Officer Training Corps. He graduated in 1980 with a Bachelor of Arts (BA) degree.

He continued his studies, graduating from the University of St Andrews with a Bachelor of Divinity (BD) degree and from Cranfield University with a Master of Defence Administration (MDA) degree. He undertook postgraduate research at the University of Edinburgh, completing his Doctor of Philosophy (PhD) degree in 1998: his doctoral thesis was titled "The Church of Scotland army chaplains in the Second World War". In 2011, he was a Farmington Fellow at Harris Manchester College, Oxford.

== Military career ==
=== Early career ===
On 1 October 1979, he was commissioned into the Royal Irish Rangers, British Army, as a second lieutenant (on probation) as part of his university cadetship. His commission was confirmed on 13 July 1980 and he was granted seniority in the rank of second lieutenant from 1 August 1976. On 13 July 1980, he was promoted to lieutenant and granted seniority in that rank from 1 August 1978. On 1 February 1983, he was promoted to captain. He resigned his commission on 20 September 1985, thereby ending his first period of full-time military service.

=== Reserve service ===
On 1 November 1985, he joined the 4th Battalion Royal Irish Rangers (North Irish Militia), part of the Territorial Army, in the rank of captain with seniority from 14 March 1983. He left the Territorial Army when he resigned his commission on 2 April 1989.

=== Ordained ministry ===
Coulter undertook training for ministry and studied theology at the University of St Andrews, graduating with a Bachelor of Divinity (BD) degree. He was ordained into the Church of Scotland on 2 April 1989. On 3 April 1989, he joined the Royal Army Chaplains' Department as a Chaplain to the Forces 4th Class (equivalent in rank to captain but lacking executive authority). He relinquished his commission on 2 April 1992 and spent the next two years working outside of the military.

On 21 February 1994, he rejoined the military as a Chaplain to the Forces 4th Class. He was promoted to Chaplain to the Forces 3rd Class (equivalent in rank to major) on 22 March 1996. On 22 March 1997, he transferred from a short service to a permanent commission. He was promoted to Chaplain to the Forces 2nd Class (equivalent in rank to lieutenant colonel) on 22 March 2002.

He was promoted to Chaplain to the Forces 1st Class (equivalent in rank to colonel) on 23 June 2005. On 1 June 2008, he was appointed the Church of Scotland Denominational Representative Chaplain. From 2008 to June 2011, he served as Principal of the Armed Forces Chaplaincy Centre. On 3 June 2011, he was appointed Deputy Chaplain General (equivalent in rank to brigadier).

In September 2013, it was announced that he would succeed Jonathan Woodhouse as Chaplain-General to Her Majesty's Land Forces when Woodhouse retired in September 2014. On 17 September 2014, he was appointed Chaplain General and promoted to a rank equivalent to major general. He undertook his final official engagement as Chaplain General in September 2018, during which he consecrated new colours for the Royal Irish Regiment (the successor to the Royal Irish Rangers with whom he had served in the 1980s). Coulter retired from the British Army on 17 April 2019.

== Retirement and later ministry ==
Having retired from the British Army, Coulter returned to civilian ministry. From 2019 to 2021, he was the minister of St Andrew's in the Grange, Saint Peter Port, the Church of Scotland church on Guernsey. In 2020, Coulter was appointed as Chaplain to the Order of St. John Guernsey. He returned to Scotland in February 2021 to take up the role of clerk to the Presbytery of Fife.

== Honours and decorations ==
Coulter was awarded the Queen's Commendation for Valuable Service 'in recognition of distinguished services in Northern Ireland during the period 1 October 1995 to 31 March 1996'. On 18 October 2007, he was appointed Honorary Chaplain to the Queen (QHC). He was appointed Serving Brother of the Order of St John (SBStJ) in August 2011, promoted to Officer of the Order of St John (OStJ) in September 2017, and is a recipient of the Service Medal of the Order of St John. In the 2016 Queen's Birthday Honours, he was appointed a Companion of the Order of the Bath (CB).

He is a recipient of the General Service Medal with Northern Ireland clasp, the United Nations Service Medal for UNFICYP, Gulf Medal with clasp, the Queen Elizabeth II Golden Jubilee Medal, the Queen Elizabeth II Diamond Jubilee Medal, and the Accumulated Campaign Service Medal. With the change in regulations opening the medal up to officers, he was awarded the Medal for Long Service and Good Conduct (Military) with one clasp in 2018: the medal recognises 15 years of service and the clasp is for a further 10 years.

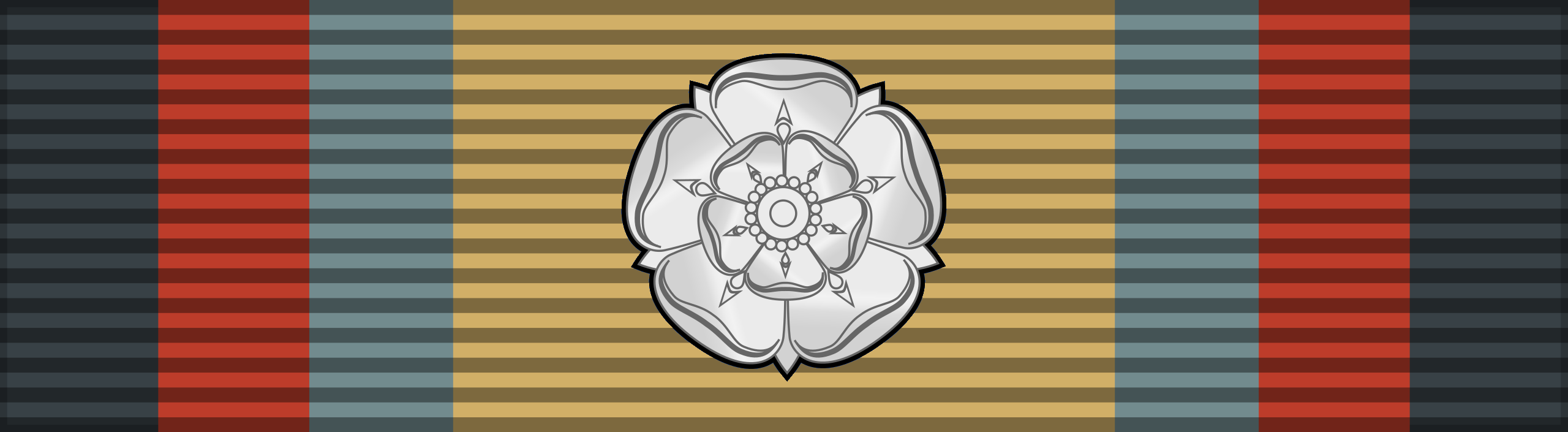

Ribbon	Description	Notes
	Order of the Bath (CB)	2016 Queen's Birthday Honours List; Companion; Military Division
	Order of St. John (OStJ)	2011; Serving Brother of the Order of St John; 2017; Officer of the Order of St John
	General Service Medal	"NORTHERN IRELAND" Clasp; Queen's Commendation for Valuable Service
	UNFICYP Medal	90 Days Service on UN Peacekeeping Mission in Cyprus
	Gulf Medal	With Clasp "16 Jan to 28 Feb 1991"
	Queen Elizabeth II Golden Jubilee Medal	2002
	Queen Elizabeth II Diamond Jubilee Medal	2012
	Accumulated Campaign Service Medal	36 Months Accumulated Campaign Service
	Medal for Long Service and Good Conduct (Military)	15 years service in British Army; With clasp for 10 further years service
	Service Medal of the Order of St John	12 Years Service with the Venerable Order of Saint John
