= British Army mess dress =

Formal military evening dress

British Army mess dress is the formal military evening dress worn by British Army officers and senior non-commissioned officers in their respective messes or at other formal occasions.

== History ==
Mess uniforms first appeared in the British Army in about 1845, initially utilizing the short shell jacket worn since 1831. This working jacket was worn open over a regimental waistcoat for evening dress. The original purpose was to provide a relatively comfortable and inexpensive alternative to the stiff and elaborate full-dress uniforms then worn by officers for evening social functions such as regimental dinners or balls. With the general disappearance of full dress uniforms after World War I, mess dress became the most colourful and traditional uniform to be retained by most officers in British and Commonwealth armies. Immediately after World War II the cheaper "blue patrols" were worn for several years as mess dress, but by 1956 the traditional uniforms had been readopted.

== Contemporary usage ==
Officers'

Other ranks'

British Army No.10 Mess Dress (Royal Yorkshire Regiment)

The formal designation of the most commonly worn mess uniform in the British Army is "No. 10 (Temperate) Mess Dress". The form varies according to regiment or corps, but generally a short mess jacket is worn, which either fastens at the neck (being cut away to show the waistcoat, this being traditionally the style worn by cavalry regiments and other mounted corps), or is worn with a white shirt and black bow tie (traditionally the usual style for unmounted regiments, corps, and services).Since regimental amalgamations, the "cut away" or cavalry-style jacket has been adopted by some British Army infantry regiments such as the Royal Regiment of Wales, the Royal Regiment of Fusiliers, and corps such as the Adjutant General's Corps and the Royal Logistic Corps. Officers of the Foot Guards, Royal Engineers, the Parachute Regiment, the Royal Army Medical Corps, and the Royal Regiment of Scotland amongst others still wear the infantry style of jacket.

The colours of mess jackets and trousers reflect those of the traditional full dress uniforms of the regiments in question, as worn until at least 1914. Jackets are, therefore, usually scarlet, dark blue, or rifle green, with collars, cuffs, waistcoats, or lapels in the facing colours of the regiments in question. In the case of those regiments which have undergone amalgamation, features of the former uniforms are often combined. Waistcoats are often richly embroidered, though with modern modifications, such as a core of cotton for gold cording instead of the thick gold cord which made these items very expensive prior to World War II. Non-commissioned officers' mess dress is usually simpler in design, but is generally (but not always) in the same colours as officers of their regiment.

Most British Army regiments' mess dress incorporates high-waisted, very tight trousers known as overalls, the bottoms of which buckle under leather Wellington or George boots. Ornamental spurs are usually worn by cavalry regiments and corps that traditionally were mounted; some other regiments and corps prescribe spurs for field officers, since in former times these officers would have been mounted. The Rifles do not wear spurs at any rank, following Light Infantry traditions since historically no Light Infantry officer rode on horseback. Scottish regiments wear kilts or tartan trews, and some wear tartan waistcoats as well.

In "No. 11 Warm Weather Mess Dress", a white drill hip-length jacket is worn with either a waistcoat in the same material or a cummerbund of regimental pattern. Blue and various shades of red or green are the most common colours for the cummerbund. Trousers or overalls are the same as in No. 10 Dress.

Female officers and soldiers wear mess jackets in a pattern similar to those of their male counterparts over dark-coloured ankle-length evening dresses. Black hand bags may be carried, and black evening shoes are worn.

== Regimental varieties ==
The various mess dress uniforms of the British Army are as follows:

- General Staff: Scarlet mess jacket with royal blue (almost black) facings, royal blue cuffs and royal blue shoulder straps with gold piping. Waistcoat is royal blue with gold buttons.

=== Household Cavalry ===
- The Life Guards: Scarlet 'cut away' cavalry-style mess jacket with royal blue stand collar, with gold piping which extends down the front and bottom of the jacket, royal blue cuffs with gold piping and gold shoulder cords. A royal blue waistcoat is worn which extends to the neck and has gold piping which runs down the front and bottom of the waistcoat.
- The Blues and Royals: Identical to that of the Life Guards except the gold piping on the cuffs is formed into a curl.

=== Royal Armoured Corps ===
- 1st The Queen's Dragoon Guards: officers wear a scarlet cavalry-style 'cut away' jacket with a dark blue stand collar, worn with a scarlet waistcoat. That worn by NCOs is instead a dark blue cavalry-style cut-away jacket with a scarlet collar and cuffs.
- Royal Scots Dragoon Guards: officers wear a scarlet cavalry-style 'cut away' jacket with yellow collar and cuffs, with gold piping. Thee waistcoat is also yellow with gold piping but with a thin line of red piping between the main body of the waistcoat and the main piping of the waistcoat.
- Royal Lancers: Royal blue 'cut away' cavalry-style mess jacket with scarlet stand collar, with gold piping which extends down the front and bottom of the jacket, scarlet cuffs with gold piping lined in scarlet and gold shoulder cords lined in scarlet. A gold waistcoat is worn which extends to the neck which does not have any piping.
- Royal Dragoon Guards: Identical to that of the Life Guards except for the collar has a row of gold piping at the bottom and the regimental badge is worn on the collar, and the shoulder cords are lined in royal blue.
- Queen's Royal Hussars: officers wear a dark blue 'cut-away' cavalry-style mess jacket with a scarlet collar with gold piping which extends down the front and bottom of the jacket. The cuffs have gold braid forming an Austrian knot on the cuffs. The mess jacket worn by NCOs is almost identical, but the gold braid on the cuffs forms a simple loop rather than an Austrian knot.
- Light Dragoons: Dark blue 'cut away' cavalry-style mess jacket with a buff stand collar with gold piping, with a thinner row of gold piping which extends down the front and bottom of the jacket. The jacket has toggle buttons and is worn open. A buff waistcoat is worn which extends to the neck and has gold piping which runs down the front and bottom of the waistcoat, with a thinner line of red piping between the main body of the waistcoat and the main piping of the waistcoat.
- King's Royal Hussars: Worn with the traditional crimson overalls of the regiment, which are derived from the 11th Hussars, it features a 'cut-away' dark blue cavalry style mess jacket with a crimson waistcoat, brass buttons and gold piping. Kukris are worn on the upper arms, and Lieutenant Colonels and above wear ring style gold piping on the collar.
- Royal Tank Regiment: A royal blue 'cut away' cavalry-style mess jacket is worn by officers, with royal blue stand collar, with gold piping which extends down the front and bottom of the jacket, and gold austrian knots on the cuffs, and gold shoulder cords. The Tank badge is worn on the upper right sleeve. A scarlet waistcoat with a thin line of gold piping and gold buttons is worn which extends to the neck. Dark blue overalls with a 2” black mohair braid stripe are worn over George boots. NCOs wear a short, royal blue double-breasted mess jacket with shoulder straps, shawl collar with regimental badges and plain cuffs closed with two buttons, over a white turn down collared shirt and black bow tie.
- Royal Yeomanry: A royal blue 'cut-away' cavalry style mess jacket is worn with a scarlet stand collar, with silver piping that runs along the bottom of the collar and also runs down the front and bottom of the mess jacket. The mess jacket also features silver shoulder boards, and scarlet cuffs which have silver piping. A silver braid fern leaf on scarlet backing is worn on the left arm. A scarlet waistcoat which buttons to the neck, with silver piping and silver braid is also worn.

=== Royal Regiment of Artillery ===
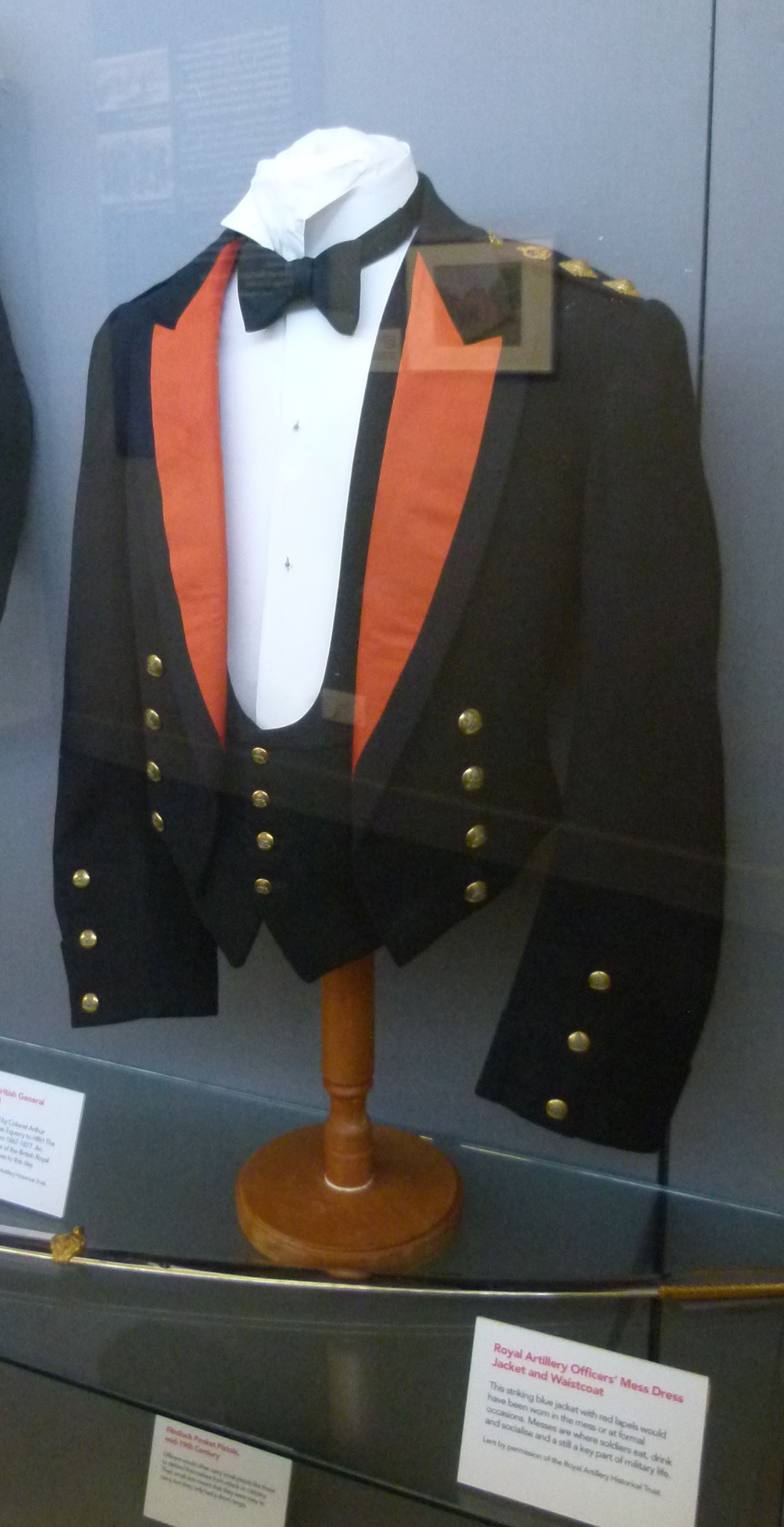
Mess dress jacket and waistcoat worn by officers in the Royal Artillery.

Double-breasted royal blue mess jacket with two rows of four gold regimental buttons on either side, peaked lapels, and scarlet facings, worn unbuttoned, dark blue shoulder straps, and a row of three gold buttons on each cuff slash, arranged vertically. The mess jackets worn by senior NCOs are the same except that the mess jacket has a shawl collar; there are three buttons on each side of the jacket rather than four, rank stripes are worn on the right upper arm, and the buttons on the cuffs are smaller (female Senior NCO's mess jackets do not have cuff buttons). A royal blue waistcoat is worn with both variations.

=== Corps of Royal Engineers ===
A scarlet mess jacket with scarlet shoulder straps, royal blue cuffs, and a royal blue shawl collar. The regimental badge is worn on both lapels, and rank stripes are worn on the right upper arm by NCOs. A royal blue waistcoat with four gold buttons is also worn.

=== Royal Corps of Signals ===
Identical to that of the Corps of Royal Engineers except for the regimental badge worn on both lapels. The variation as worn by NCOs does not feature shoulder straps.

=== Infantry ===
- Grenadier Guards: A scarlet mess jacket without shoulder straps, royal blue cuffs with the number of rows of gold piping denoting the wearer's rank, and a royal blue shawl collar. The regimental badge is worn on both lapels, and rank stripes are worn on the right upper arm by NCOs. A royal blue waistcoat with four gold buttons is also worn. The version worn by NCOs does not feature the thin line of gold piping on the cuffs.
- Coldstream Guards: Identical to that worn by the Grenadier guards except for the regimental badge worn on both lapels, and the four gold buttons on the waistcoat are arranged in pairs. The version worn by NCOs feature the white rose of York on either lapel rather than the regimental badge.
- Scots Guards: Identical to that worn by the Grenadier guards except for the regimental badge worn on both lapels, and the three gold buttons on the waistcoat rather than four. The version worn by NCOs feature the thistle of Scotland on either lapel rather than the regimental badge.
- Irish Guards: Identical to that worn by the Grenadier guards except for the regimental badge worn on both lapels. The version worn by NCOs feature the shamrock of Ireland on either lapel rather than the regimental badge.
- Welsh Guards: Identical to that worn by the Grenadier guards except for the regimental badge worn on both lapels, and the five gold buttons on the waistcoat rather than four. The version worn by NCOs feature the leek of Wales on either lapel rather than the regimental badge
- Royal Regiment of Scotland: A single-breasted scarlet mess jacket with four gold regimental buttons, royal blue notched lapels with white piping, royal blue cuffs also with white piping, and gold shoulder cords. A royal blue waistcoat with gold piping and four gold regimental buttons is also worn. The version worn by NCO's has a royal blue shawl collar, only three regimental gold buttons, no piping on the cuffs, no shoulder cords and the waistcoat worn is regimental tartan rather than royal blue.
- Royal Regiment of Fusiliers: For officers, a scarlet 'cut away' cavalry-style mess jacket with royal blue stand collar with regimental badge, with gold piping which extends down the front and bottom of the jacket, as well as along the bottom of the collar, royal blue cuffs with no piping and gold shoulder cords. A royal blue waistcoat is worn which extends to the neck and has gold buttons. NCOs wear instead a single-breasted scarlet mess jacket with four gold regimental buttons, scarlet shawl lapels with the regimental badge on each lapel, no shoulder cords, rank stripes on the right upper arm and no buttons on the jacket. A royal blue waistcoat with four gold regimental buttons is worn.
- Royal Anglian Regiment: A single-breasted scarlet mess jacket with four gold buttons, gold shoulder cords, royal blue cuffs without piping, and a royal blue shawl collar without regimental badge. A royal blue waistcoat with four gold regimental buttons is also worn. The version worn by NCOs does not feature shoulder cords or buttons on the mess jacket.
- Princess of Wales' Royal Regiment: For officers, a scarlet 'cut away' cavalry-style mess jacket with yellow stand collar with regimental badge, with gold piping which extends down the front and bottom of the jacket, as well as along the bottom of the collar, gold cuffs with white piping and gold shoulder cords lined in scarlet. A royal blue waistcoat is worn which extends to the neck and is closed by hooks, with gold piping which is formed into an austrian knot at the bottom. NCOs wear instead a single-breasted scarlet mess jacket with four gold regimental buttons, gold shawl lapels with the regimental badge on each lapel, no shoulder cords, rank stripes on the right upper arm and a badge on the left upper arm. A royal blue waistcoat with four gold regimental buttons is worn.
- Duke of Lancaster's Regiment: For officers, a single-breasted scarlet mess jacket with gold shoulder cords, royal blue shawl collar with white piping, royal blue cuffs, with white piping with royal blue cuff slashes with three gold buttons arranged vertically. A royal lion of England is worn centrally on each lapel. The waistcoat is royal blue with piping of gold braid arranged into an Austrian knot at the bottom, and four gold buttons. The version worn by NCOs does not feature shoulder cords, piping on the shawl collar, cuffs, or waistcoat and does not feature the cuff slashes.
- Royal Yorkshire Regiment: For officers, single-breasted scarlet mess jacket with four buttons royal blue shoulder straps, royal blue shawl collar, royal blue cuffs, with royal blue cuff slashes with three gold buttons arranged vertically. The regimental badge is worn centrally on each lapel. The waistcoat is royal blue with much gold braid around the edge. The version (also single-breasted) worn by NCOs does not feature shoulder straps, has a scarlet shawl collar, four gold buttons, red cuffs, and features a royal blue waistcoat with four gold buttons that features no gold braid. Rank stripes are worn on the upper right arm.
- Royal Irish Regiment: For officers, a scarlet single-breasted mess jacket with no buttons, a rifle-green shawl collar with the regimental badge worn on each lapel, rifle green shoulder cords, rifle green cuffs, and a single-breasted rifle-green waistcoat with four gold buttons. The version worn by NCOs is the same, but does not have shoulder cords and the rank insignia is worn on the upper right arm.
- The Rifles: For officers, a rifle green cutaway 'cavalry style' mess jacket with scarlet stand collar, black corded piping down the front and bottom, and hussar-style braiding in black across the front of the jacket. The collar and cuffs are scarlet but are overlaid with a complex amount of black braid. A rifle green waistcoat is worn that has red piping, again overlaid with a lot of black braiding down the front and bottom of the waistcoat. The waistcoat is closed by 'hook and eye' fasteners. NCOs wear instead a rifle green single-breasted mess jacket with no buttons, a rifle-green shawl collar with no regimental badge. Rank stripes are worn on the upper right arm of the mess jacket. A similar rifle green waistcoat to that worn by officers is worn, albeit with less of the black braiding overlaid on the red piping.
- Mercian Regiment: For officers, a scarlet cutaway 'cavalry style' mess jacket with a buff-coloured stand collar featuring the regimental badge, with gold piping on the collar that extends down the front of the jacket, gold shoulder cords, and buff-coloured cuffs. A royal blue waistcoat is worn which buttons up to the neck and has gold piping, with the regimental badge at the bottom of the jacket on either side. NCOs wear instead a scarlet single-breasted scarlet mess jacket with a scarlet shawl collar, scarlet cuffs, and with the regimental badge worn on each lapel. A royal blue waistcoat with royal blue lapels and four gold buttons is worn, and rank stripes are worn on the upper right arm of the jacket.
- Royal Welsh: For officers, a scarlet cutaway 'cavalry style' mess jacket with a yellow stand collar featuring the regimental badge, with a thin layer of gold piping on the collar that extends down the front of the jacket, gold shoulder cords lined in scarlet, and yellow cuffs, and a badge on the left upper arm. A royal blue waistcoat is worn which fastens up to the neck by 'hook and eye' fastenings and has another thin layer of gold piping, with austrian knots at the bottom of the jacket on either side. NCOs wear instead a scarlet single-breasted scarlet mess jacket with four gold buttons and a yellow shawl collar, yellow cuffs, and with the regimental badge worn on each lapel. A royal blue waistcoat with no lapels and four gold buttons is worn, and rank stripes are worn on the upper right arm of the jacket, and a badge on the upper left arm.
- Parachute Regiment: A single-breasted scarlet mess jacket with four gold buttons and a maroon shawl collar, maroon cuffs, maroon shoulder straps and with the regimental badge worn on each lapel. A royal blue waistcoat with no lapels and four gold buttons is worn. The version worn by NCOs is identical except that rank stripes and parachute badge are worn on the upper right arm of the jacket.
- Royal Gurkha Rifles: Identical to that worn by officers of the Rifles, except that it features black shoulder cords, and black cuffs instead of scarlet ones.

=== Army Air Corps ===
For officers, a royal blue cutaway 'cavalry style' mess jacket with cambridge blue stand collar, gold piping down the front and bottom of the jacket, as well as down the bottom of the collar, and cambridge blue cuffs with a thin line of gold piping, and royal blue shoulder straps. A cambridge blue waistcoat is worn with gold piping which is closed by 'hook and eye' fasteners. NCOs wear instead a royal blue single-breasted mess jacket with no buttons, a cambridge blue shawl collar with no regimental badge. Rank stripes are worn on the upper right arm of the mess jacket.

=== Royal Logistic Corps ===
A royal blue cutaway 'cavalry style' mess jacket with a royal blue stand collar, a gold chain passing between the two parts of the collar, with gold piping down the front and bottom of the jacket, as well as down the top and bottom of the collar, and royal blue cuffs with a line of gold piping, and gold shoulder cords. A royal blue waistcoat with gold piping is worn with gold piping that is closed by 'hook and eye' fasteners. That worn by NCOs is the same, only the lines of gold piping on jacket and waistcoat are thinner, it features gold shoulder straps rather than shoulder cords, and rank stripes are worn on the upper right arm. The mess jacket as worn by female NCOs is the same as that worn by male NCOs but does not feature shoulder straps.

=== Royal Army Chaplains' Department ===
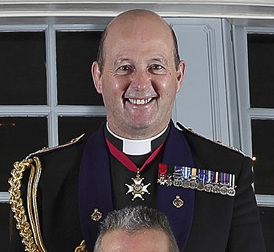
Chaplain General David Coulter

A royal blue mess jacket with a purple shawl collar featuring the departmental badge on either lapel, purple cuffs, and royal blue shoulder straps. A purple cummerbund, black clerical shirt, and white clerical collar are also worn.

=== Royal Army Medical Corps ===
For officers, a royal blue single-breasted mess jacket with four gold buttons, a dull cherry-red shawl collar with corps badge on each lapel, dull cherry-red cuffs, and dull cherry-red shoulder straps. A dull cherry-red waistcoat with four gold buttons is also worn. The version worn by NCOs has no buttons on the mess jacket, lacks shoulder straps and has rank stripes on the upper right arm of the mess jacket.

=== Corps of Royal Electrical and Mechanical Engineers ===
A royal-blue single-breasted mess jacket with no buttons, a royal blue shawl collar with the corps badge on each lapel, royal blue shoulder straps, and royal blue cuffs. A scarlet waistcoat with four gold buttons is also worn. The version worn by NCOs lacks the shoulder straps and the corps badge on the lapels of the mess jacket, and features rank stripes on the upper right arm, and features three gold buttons on the cuffs.

=== Adjutant General's Corps ===
A scarlet cavalry-style 'cut away' style mess jacket with a royal blue stand collar featuring the corps badge, with gold piping on the top and bottom of the collar, and running down the front of the jacket, gold shoulder straps, and royal blue cuffs with gold piping. A royal blue waistcoat is worn with complicated gold braid down the front and bottom of the jacket, which buttons to the neck. That worn by NCOs is the same but lacks shoulder straps, the gold piping on the cuffs, corps badge on the collar, and it features gold piping on the waistcoat instead of gold braid and rank stripes are worn on the upper right arm.

=== Royal Army Veterinary Corps ===
A black double breasted mess jacket with no buttons, with two button holes on each side of the jacket, peaked lapels with burgundy facings, black cuffs, and black shoulder straps. NCOs wear their rank stripes on the right upper arm. A black single-breasted waistcoat with lapels and four gold buttons is also worn.

=== Small Arms School Corps ===
For officers, a scarlet single-breasted mess jacket, with no buttons, with a Cambridge blue shawl collar with the corps badge on both lapels, scarlet shoulder straps, and Cambridge blue cuffs is worn. A single-breasted Cambridge blue waistcoat with four gold buttons is also worn. The version worn by NCOs has no shoulder straps, lacks the Cambridge-blue cuffs and features rank stripes on the upper right arm, but is in all other respects identical.

=== Royal Army Dental Corps ===
For officers, a single-breasted royal blue mess jacket with four gold buttons, with a green shawl collar with corps badge on each lapel, green shoulder straps, and green cuffs is worn. A single-breasted green waistcoat without lapels with four gold buttons is also worn. The version worn by NCOs has no shoulder straps, lacks the green cuffs and features rank stripes on the upper right arm, but is in all other respects the same.

=== Intelligence Corps ===
For officers, a single-breasted cypress green mess jacket with no buttons, with a French grey shawl collar with corps badge on each lapel, French grey shoulder straps, and French grey pointed cuffs is worn. A single-breasted French grey lapelled waistcoat with four gold buttons is also worn. The version worn by NCOs has no shoulder straps, lacks the French grey cuffs and features rank stripes on the upper right arm, but is in all other respects identical.

=== Royal Army Physical Training Corps ===
For officers, a black 'cut-away' cavalry style mess jacket is worn with a scarlet stand collar, with gold piping. The corps badge is featured on the collar. The mess jacket also features scarlet shoulder straps and scarlet cuffs, and a scarlet waistcoat is worn which buttons to the neck and is fastened by gold buttons. NCOs wear instead a scarlet single-breasted mess jacket with a black shawl collar with the corps badge on each lapel, black cuffs, rank stripes on the upper right arm, and no shoulder straps. A black single-breasted waistcoat with no lapels and four gold buttons is also worn.

=== Queen Alexandra's Royal Army Nursing Corps ===
For officers, a scarlet 'cut-away' cavalry style mess jacket is worn with a grey stand collar, with white piping that runs along the bottom of the collar and also runs down the front and bottom of the mess jacket, with ten gold buttons. The mess jacket also features scarlet shoulder straps with white piping, and grey cuffs which have white piping that terminates in an Austrian knot. A grey waistcoat is worn which buttons to the neck and is fastened by gold buttons and has white piping. The version worn by male NCOs is identical but has no shoulder straps, no white piping on the cuffs, and no buttons on the mess jacket or waistcoat. The version worn by female officers is similar to that worn by male officers but has instead a scarlet stand collar with no white piping at the bottom, instead the piping goes across the top of the collar and down the front and bottom of the jacket. The jacket also features scarlet cuffs which have white piping that does not terminate in an Austrian knot, and four gold buttons on the opposite side of the jacket from male officers, and no waistcoat is worn.

=== Honourable Artillery Company ===
For officers, a royal blue "cut-away" cavalry style mess jacket is worn with a scarlet stand collar (featuring the regimental badge), with gold piping that runs along the bottom of the collar and also runs down the front and bottom of the mess jacket. The mess jacket also features gold shoulder cords, and scarlet cuffs which have gold piping that terminates in an Austrian knot. A scarlet waistcoat is worn which buttons to the neck and is fastened by gold buttons and has gold piping. The version worn by male Other Ranks and JNCOs is identical but has thinner shoulder cords, thinner gold piping on the cuffs, waistcoat and stand collar, and no buttons on the mess jacket or waistcoat (instead being fastened by 'hook and eye' fastenings). SNCO's have gold piping down the back on both sides. Neither JNCOs or SNCOs below WO2 wear any rank identification ("stripes")

=== General Service Corps ===
A single-breasted scarlet mess jacket without buttons, with a brown shawl collar featuring the corps badge on both lapels, brown shoulder straps and brown cuffs. A brown waistcoat with four gold buttons is also worn.

=== Women’s Royal Army Corps (Defunct) ===
An off-white, short-sleeved evening gown covered in gold floral embroidery chasing over white matching appliqué. Worn with a kind of dark green sash. This sash was worn so that most of the fabric flowed in a trimmed rectangle behind the woman, with a short diamond-shaped portion immediately before the epaulette, which was of the same green fabric and displayed rank insignia as on a normal uniform. The ‘sash’ was not a continuous loop but rather a strip of fabric.
