= David Cooper (chaplain) =

Former British Army Chaplain who served during the Falklands War of 1982

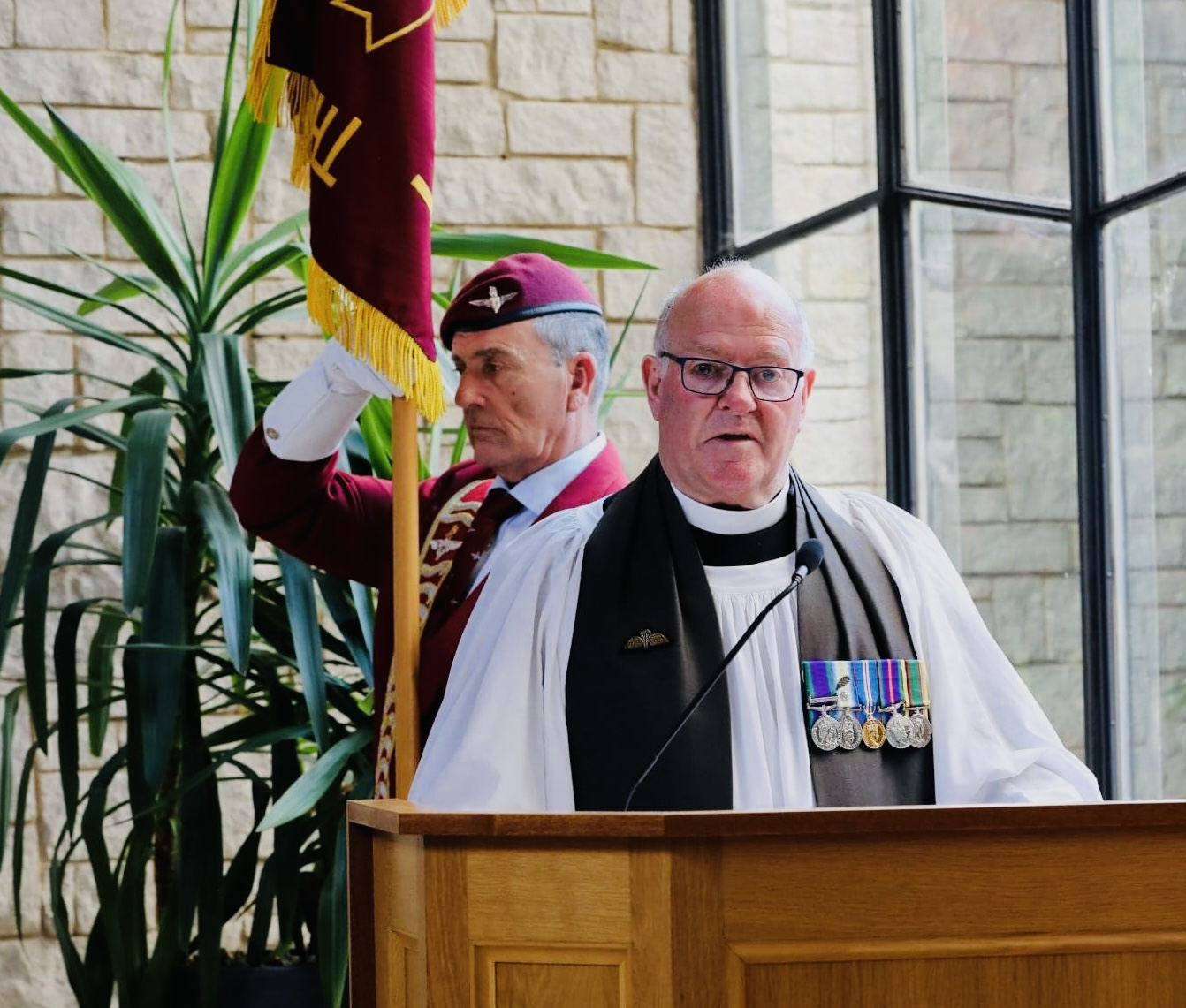
Rev. David Cooper CF in 2022

The Reverend David Cooper (born 1944) was the Army Chaplain (or "Padre") attached to the 2nd Battalion, The Parachute Regiment (2 PARA) during the Falklands War of 1982. He was filmed for television news on 30 May 1982 officiating at the moving field burial service for the 18 Paras who were killed in the Battle of Goose Green, including Lt. Col.'H' Jones. During that service he used the expression "Think on", which became something of a catchphrase for him with the media. Cooper was also an army champion shot at Bisley. He ministered to the 2nd Battalion, The Parachute Regiment during the Falklands War and during its tours in Northern Ireland.

== Regular army service ==
Cooper was commissioned on a short service commission as a Chaplain to the Forces, Fourth Class, on 20 March 1973. On 20 March 1979 he switched to a full commission and was promoted to Chaplain to the Forces, Third Class. He was appointed chaplain to 2 PARA in late 1980, and so accompanied the battalion to the Falkland Islands in 1982 when the battalion, with 3 PARA, was attached to 3 Commando Brigade to bring that unit to full wartime strength. During the Battle of Goose Green he was attached to the Regimental Aid Post, comforting the wounded, and assisting in the organisation of their evacuation. Following the battle he conducted a field burial service, film of which was later shown on television news programmes. He was also present when the battalion was shaken by an ammunition explosion in the aftermath of Goose Green, and during the Battle of Wireless Ridge.

At the conclusion of the campaign he was recommended for a Military Cross by the new CO of 2 PARA, Lt-Col David Chaundler; this was endorsed by the brigade commander, Brigadier Julian Thompson who "Very Strongly Recommended" the award, and the divisional commander, Major General Jeremy Moore, who "Strongly Recommended" it; but Lieutenant General Sir Richard Trant downgraded the award, instead "Very Strongly Recommend[ing]" a Mention in Despatches, and this was endorsed in similar terms by Admiral Sir John Fieldhouse. Chaundler's recommendation closed with the words "The Battalion owes an enormous debt of gratitude to a selfless, dedicated and courageous man who lives up to the very highest traditions of his calling." The Mention was gazetted on 8 October 1982.

== Eton College ==
Cooper retired from the regular army on 29 September 1984, and became a chaplain at Eton College, which was later attended by Princes William and Harry. On 17 January 1990 he took a Territorial Army commission, reverting to Chaplain to the Forces, Fourth Class, and on 8 October 1994 he became a lieutenant in Eton College Combined Cadet Force detachment. He was promoted back to Chaplain to the Forces, Third Class in the TA on 15 March 1995. He was awarded the Cadet Forces Medal on 16 June 1999, by which time he held the rank of lieutenant colonel in the CCF. He retired as a TA chaplain on 30 June 1999.

In 2002 it was reported in the media that the Royal Military Police had seized weapons during a raid on his home in the grounds of the elite school in Berkshire. Subsequent investigation showed the claims to be malicious in origin and damages were paid by a number of media outlets. At the time officers were investigating alleged financial irregularities at the college, a claim denied by the college's governing body.

== Recent career ==
Cooper was a major contributor to the 1994 book The Scars of War by Hugh McManners, which attempted to compare the ways in which the British Army, the US Army and the Israeli Defence Force motivate their peacetime soldiery and train their special forces. However, Cooper disagreed with many of the book's conclusions, believing that McManners had been selective in his use of examples and personal experiences in order to support an existing view of the subject rather than to present an objective assessment.

Aegis Defence Services, a London-based, privately owned, British security and risk management company with overseas offices in Afghanistan, Bahrain, Iraq, Kenya, Nepal and the US, appointed Cooper to be head of civil affairs in Iraq on a one-year contract. As a chaplain in the British Army, he had seen active service which led to his being a recognised expert and lecturer in posttraumatic stress disorder (PTSD). His role in Iraq will be to oversee the civil affair programme AEGIS is running as part of its $300 million contract for the US government to provide a security and co-ordination framework for the reconstruction effort in Iraq.
