= David Wilkes =

The Reverend David Wilkes CB OBE
- Born: David Edward Wilkes; 7 June 1947 (age 79)
- Military career
- Allegiance: United Kingdom
- Branch: British Army
- Service years: 1980 to 2008
- Rank: Major-General
- Service number: 504126
- Commands: Royal Army Chaplains' Department
- Conflicts: Cold War; The Troubles

David Edward Wilkes (born 7 June 1947) is a British Methodist minister and military chaplain. From 2004 to 2008, he was Chaplain-General to the Land Forces and was therefore head of the Royal Army Chaplains' Department.

== Honours ==
On 14 November 1995, Wilkes was appointed an Officer of the Order of the British Empire (OBE) "in recognition of gallant and distinguished services in Northern Ireland during the period 1st October 1994 to 31st March 1995". In the 2008 New Year Honours, he was appointed a Companion of the Order of the Bath (CB).

On 16 January 2005, Wilkes was made an Honorary Ecumenical Canon of Ripon Cathedral by John Packer, the Bishop of Ripon and Leeds. He was the first Methodist minister to become a canon of that Anglican cathedral.
