= Humanist Counseling in the Dutch Armed Forces =

Humanist Counseling in the Dutch Armed Forces is a task in the Armed forces of the Netherlands. Humanist counsellors, sometimes called humanist chaplain, contribute to the (mental) well-being of military personnel, those related to them, and veterans. They do this through visible presence at the workplace, personal contact and guidance. They hold conversations, give advice and offer support. Issues concerning meaning and ethics are central to their work.

== Task description ==
The work of humanist counsellors in the armed forces consists of:

- Presence at the workplaces, training locations and during deployments
- Individual guidance to (former) military personnel and those related to them
- Informal training for groups
- Education/training in e.g. ethics
- Philosophical/spiritual meetings
- Contribution to military ceremonies
- Identification of, and advice and counselling on issues that concern the well-being of people (humanization)
- Participation in Social Medical Teams (SMT’s), together with other aid and care workers.

Humanist counsellors are appointed as civil servants, though for carrying out their work they are viewed equivalent to the military ranks (captain, major or lieutenant colonel). They are employed in the military, not by the military, and work outside the military hierarchy. Professionally they are not accountable to the Ministry of Defence or the military authority, but to the agency that sends them, the Dutch Humanist Society (Humanistisch Verbond). This service exists primarily for the people, not for the military apparatus. Humanist counsellors thus like to call themselves (positively) critically involved.

Humanist counsellors give support, but also maintain a critical distance. It means being part of the (military) unit, befriending them and gaining access to their world, while at the same time being able to pose the critical question, keeping sufficient distance to be able to see things from a different perspective, to remain the involved outsider.

Wherever the soldiers are stationed, humanist counsellors are active, working for the benefit of the mental well-being of personnel in the armed forces. Humanist counsellors are thus, also stationed outside the Netherlands, for example at Curaçao, and join missions abroad as well as longer naval operations.

A humanist counsellor works together with the unit they're stationed with. A counsellor goes along once in a while on patrol, helps out in the kitchen sometimes, sits with the guards at another time, or visits someone at the military field hospital. They are a member of the unit, while holding an independent position as well. They also join the deployments abroad, so they live and work in the same circumstances as the soldiers.

The humanist counseling department in the armed forces was introduced on 1 September 1964, in order to serve secular and non-religious soldiers. The department started with five counsellors. Over the years however, it has developed into one of the major counseling departments of the armed forces, with a current total of thirty eight humanist counsellors. The counsellors adopt the humanist philosophy in their work, not imposing one’s ideas onto others. In this form of counselling, the person asking for help and his own views and ways of thinking are central. But the counsellors do try to contribute to the humanization of the armed forces, by creating a more dignified, humane atmosphere.

Humanism is a life stance in which the human being is central. Humanists want to determine their life-choices themselves, assuming self-responsibility, and living autonomously, but in connection with others and the world around them.

== Literature ==
- Gasenbeek, B., Winkelaar, P., Humanisme (uitgeverij Kok, Kampen 2007, derde druk, 2009). Digital version via www.uvh.nl/hhc/archieven/kernteksten/humanistisch-verbond (Dutch)
- Brabers, Jules, Van pioniers tot professionals. De Dienst Humanistisch Geestelijke Verzorging bij de krijgsmacht (1964-2004), (uitgeverij De Tijdstroom, Het Humanistisch Archief, Utrecht 2006). Retrieved from http://www.uvh.nl/hhc/bronnen/kernteksten-humanisme/humanistisch-verbond. (Dutch)
- Brabers, Jules, Gasenbeek, Bert, Humanistisch vormingswerk; voor de reflectie en niet voor de actie, in Beukbergen jubilea 2010. 100 Jaar landhuis, 60 jaar vormingscentrum (Commando dienstencentra Ministerie van Defensie, Den Haag, februari 2010). (Dutch)
- Brabers, Jules, Gasenbeek, Bert, Als het erop aankomt. Aspecten uit 50 jaar humanistisch geestelijke begeleiding bij de krijgsmacht, in Journal of Humanistic Studies Waardenwerk (magazine of University of Humanistic Studies, uitgave.. 2014). (Dutch)
- Kamp, Erwin, Raadsman heeft u nog raad? Persoonlijke ervaringen van een humanistisch geestelijk verzorger bij het Korps Mariniers (Papieren Tijger, October 2009) (Dutch)
- Kamp, E., Gasenbeek, B., 50 jaar Humanistisch Geestelijke Verzorging bij de Krijgsmacht in 50 beelden. Papieren Tijger, 2014. ISBN 978 90 6728 3021 (Dutch)
- Kamp, E., Schol, M., Na de missie. Tips en tools voor militairen, veteranen en het thuisfront (Eburon, 2012), (Dutch))
