= Samuel Green (priest) =

The Reverend Samuel Frederick Leighton Green, MC and Bar (6 April 1882 – 29 May 1929) was a British Army chaplain who served in France and Belgium between 1916 and 1919.

== Birth and education ==
Green was born in Greenwich in 1882, the elder son of Catherine Green and Frederick Green, a civil servant at the War Office. He was educated at King's College School, London, and St Paul's Theological College, University of London.

== Early chaplaincy ==
In 1904 Green was appointed assistant curate at St Bartholomew's church, Heigham, Norwich as a deacon of the Church of England. In 1905 he was ordained a priest by the Rt Revd John Sheepshanks, bishop of Norwich. In 1912 he transferred to St Barnabas's Church, Heigham as assistant priest to the Revd Charles Compton Lanchester.

== First World War ==
In August 1915 the Revd Lanchester went over to France to serve as an ambulance driver for the Red Cross, regularly writing up his experiences for the parish magazine, an example Green would follow assiduously for the next three years. After Lanchester returned to the parish at the end of 1915 Green volunteered to join the Army Chaplains' Department. He was commissioned with the rank of Temporary Chaplain to the Forces 4th Class in February 1916 and sent over to France almost immediately.

His first post was to a Casualty Clearing Station (CCS 22) in Aire-sur-la-Lys and later in Bruay, where he also acted as padre to RFC Squadron No. 18. In December 1916 Green was transferred to frontline service with the 1/4th Battalion, London Regiment, a Territorial battalion recruited from Tower Hamlets. He remained the padre of this unit through to its decommission in 1919. During this period he was present at the battles of Arras, Passchendaele, 1st and 2nd Cambrai, the Kaiserschlacht and Bapaume. He was wounded by shrapnel at Arras on Easter Sunday, April 1917, while conducting divine service; gassed near Bullecourt in the Hindenburg line in August 1918 and also contracted trench fever. He was held in high regard by the officers and men of the 1/4th Londons. After the war the official historian of the battalion wrote of him:

His constant selfless devotion to duty and his kindly personality had made him a true friend to one and all, and the example of his simple life and magnificent courage in action had been a real inspiration to all — and that included the whole Battalion — who had been brought into contact with him.

Green was awarded the Military Cross for gallantry on two occasions (Gazetted 1 January 1919 and 2 April 1919). His second (Bar) MC was given a full citation in the London Gazette on 9 December 1919:

For conspicuous gallantry and devotion to duty at Sebourquiaux on 4 November 1918. During the advance he attended to the wounded, frequently under fire. He went forward and stayed for over an hour with a badly wounded signaller lying out in the open under shell fire, until the stretcher-bearers could fetch him away.

Between March 1916 and February 1919 Green wrote one letter per month for publication in St Barnabas's parish magazine, detailing his experiences on the Western Front. These provide a vivid picture of the work of an Army Chaplain on the Western Front, in hospitals, in the trenches and on the battlefield. He used his parish letters to promote a "Fag-Mag" fund to buy cigarettes, magazines and other comforts for the troops in his unit. This endeavour earned him the nickname "the Heigham Woodbine Willie" among his parishioners. A selection of his war-time parish letters, The Happy Padre, was published in Norwich in 1929. A complete edition and biography, Somewhere in Flanders, was published in 2005.

On leaving the Army Chaplains' Department in 1919 he was appointed an Honorary Chaplain to the Forces. He also did much work to support the British Legion.

== Post-First World War ==
Green returned to his chaplaincy at St Barnabas in 1919 and continued his parish work there until 1921 when he was appointed rector of All Saints church, Mundesley, Norfolk, where he remained until his death, after a short illness, in 1929, aged 47. He was buried in Mundesley churchyard with full military honours provided by the British Legion and comrades from the 1/4th Londons.

In 2005 a commemorative plaque recording Green's life and service was placed on the north wall of St Barnabas's Church, Heigham, Norfolk, alongside the parish's Great War Roll of Honour.

In March 2014 BBC Radio Norfolk began to serialise The Rev. Green's war-time letters each week during its "Sunday Breakfast" religious programme as part of the BBC's 100th anniversary of the First World War commemorations. A 3-CD set of the broadcast readings, 'Dear People ...', has been produced by St Barnabas church in Norwich, see: BBC - World War One At Home, Church of St Barnabas, Heigham: Letters from the Front

== Bibliography ==
Field, Clive British Religion and the World Wars. A Subject Bibliography of Modern Literature. Cambridge Scholars Publishing, Newcastle upon Tyne, 2019: p. 47.
