= Royal Army Chaplains' Museum =

Coordinates: 51.604409°N 1.645101°W

The Royal Army Chaplains' Museum (formerly the Museum of Army Chaplaincy) at Shrivenham, England, tells the story of British Army chaplaincy from earliest times to the present day, with the help of archive material and historical relics from several centuries.

== Collection ==
Its collection is dedicated to the work of Army Chaplains throughout history in peacetime, under fire, and in captivity. The museum archives also hold material relating to the department and its history, including information on the four chaplains who have been awarded the Victoria Cross. There is a linked charity, The Museum Of The Royal Army Chaplains' Department, which was first registered in 1979.

The museum's collections include the remaining records of the Royal Army Temperance Association and the records of the Churches' Work for Women in the Forces.

== History ==
The museum was housed in Bagshot Park, Surrey, until 2001 when it was rehoused in a converted stable block at Amport House in Hampshire. Amport House was the home of the Royal Army Chaplains' Department (and the joint service Armed Forces Chaplaincy Centre) until 2020, when the property was sold by the Ministry of Defence.

The new energy-efficient building for the museum at the Defence Academy, Shrivenham, Oxfordshire was designed by Hewitt Studios of Bath, and opened by the Countess of Wessex on 17 May 2022.

== See also ==
- U.S. Army Chaplain Museum
