= Chaplain general =

The chaplain general is a senior chaplain in non-church organisations, such as the British and Canadian armies, and is responsible for the supervision of chaplains conducting religious services and ceremonies, representing the Christian faith in that organisation, and providing pastoral care and support within the organisation.

== History ==
The post of Chaplain-General in the British Army dates from 1796, when the Army Chaplains' Department was formed.

During the First World War, the chaplain-general John Taylor Smith was equivalent to a major general and under the control of the Permanent Under-Secretary of State. Llewellyn Henry Gwynne was from July 1915 deputy chaplain-general of the army in France, with the relative rank of major-general. Both had been colonial bishops prior to appointment.

In the Second World War, the head of chaplaincy in the British Army was an (Anglican) chaplain-general, who was formally under the control of the Permanent Under-Secretary of State. An Assistant Chaplain-General was a Chaplain 1st class (full Colonel) and a senior Chaplain was a Chaplain 2nd class (Lieutenant Colonel).

In 1948 the first Bishop to the Forces was appointed; the Bishop is a suffragan of the Archbishop of Canterbury, the full title of the Bishop to the Forces is "The Archbishop of Canterbury's Episcopal Representative to the Armed Forces". The Bishop to the Forces is not a military chaplain. The current holder of the office is Tim Thornton, Bishop at Lambeth. There is sometimes confusion between the (Anglican) "Bishop to the Forces" and the (Roman Catholic) "Bishop of the Forces": for this reason the latter is normally given his title in full, i.e. "The Roman Catholic Bishop of the Forces".

Each of the three armed services has a chief chaplain (ranking as an archdeacon), for the navy the Chaplain of the Fleet, for the army the Chaplain-General, and for the Royal Air Force the Chaplain-in-Chief.

The Museum of Army Chaplaincy holds archive material and information relating to the history of the Chaplains General to the British Army both past and present.

== Outside Anglicanism ==
Chaplain General is also used as a term outside the Anglican Church, referring to the senior chaplain in a nation's military (sometimes called the Chief of Chaplains, as in the United States military). Some nations, like South Africa, Israel, and Canada, have one Chaplain General or Chief of Chaplains for the military as a whole; others, like the United States, have one for each branch of the armed forces; while others have one for each major religion or faith group represented among its military personnel.

== See also ==
- Royal Army Chaplains' Department (RAChD) (U.K.)
- Royal Canadian Chaplain Service
- Chiefs of Chaplains of the United States
- International Military Chiefs of Chaplains Conference
- Military chaplain#Military chaplains by country
