= Royal Air Force Chaplains Branch =

- RAF Chaplains Branch badge
- Active: 1 April 1918 – Present
- Country: United Kingdom
- Branch: Royal Air Force
- Role: Chaplaincy
- Mottos: Ministrare Non Ministrari (Latin for To serve, not to be served)

Commanders
- Chaplain-in-Chief: Air Vice-Marshal Giles Legood

Insignia
- Badge: Royal Air Force Chaplain Collar Insignia enlarged

The Royal Air Force Chaplains Branch provides military chaplains for the Royal Air Force of the United Kingdom.

== Mission ==
The Mission of the Royal Air Force Chaplains Branch is to serve the RAF Community through: Prayer, Presence and Proclamation. The motto of the branch Ministrare Non Ministrari translates as ..To serve, not to be served and is derived from Mark chapter 10: verse 45.

== History ==
The Reverend Harry Viener was invested as the first Chaplain-in-Chief on 11 October 1918 with the Chaplaincy branch officially established in December 1918. Reverend Viener had been a Royal Naval Chaplain and was 'lent' to the Air Force by the Admiralty. A Chaplaincy school was established at Magdalene College, Cambridge University in November 1943 with the motto of 'Truth'. The Chaplaincy School was moved to Dowdeswell Court in Gloucestershire in February 1945. Thereafter it moved to Amport House in Hampshire in December 1961. In September 2016, the Ministry of Defence announced that Amport House would be put up for sale as part of a programme of defence estate rationalisation. A Better Defence Estate, published in November 2016, indicated that the Armed Forces Chaplaincy Centre would close by 2020, which it subsequently did.

== Training ==
RAF chaplains receive training on the Specialist Officers Initial Training Course (SOITC) at RAF College Cranwell in Lincolnshire. Both RAF chaplains and candidates receive training at the Armed Forces Chaplaincy Centre, the latter was located at Amport House until 2020. The Armed Forces Chaplaincy Centre was relocated to Beckett House, Shrivenham, near Swindon. In 2020 The Reverend (Group Captain) Geoffrey Withers KHC was the first RAF Chaplain appointed Principal, Armed Forces Chaplaincy Centre Shrivenham.

== Endorsing authorities ==
To serve in the Chaplains Branch, chaplains and candidates must be endorsed by a religious body. RAF commissioned chaplains are accepted from the various Christian denominations. The British military forces are also served by "tri-service chaplains" from other world faiths, including Buddhist, Hindu, Muslim, and Sikh. In 2018, the first Sikh and Muslim military chaplains to join the British armed forces passed out from the Royal Air Force College Cranwell to join the RAF Chaplain's Branch. In November 2023 the Ministry of Defence announced the intent to recruit Non-Religious Pastoral Support Officers into Chaplaincy in order to reflect the changing demographics of the United Kingdom and HM Forces.

== Noncombatant status ==
See: Military chaplain § Non-combatant status

== Chaplain-in-Chief ==
The RAF Chaplains Branch is led by a Chaplain-in-Chief. Harry Viener was the first Chaplain-in-Chief. When the Chaplain-in-Chief is an Anglican, he or she is also the Archdeacon for the Royal Air Force – otherwise, the most senior Anglican chaplain takes that title along with that of Principal Anglican Chaplain.

- 1918–1926 Harry Viener CBE KHC
- 1926–1930 Robert Hanson OBE KHC
- 1930–1933 Sidney Clarke KHC
- 1933–1940 James Walkey OBE KHC
- 1940–1944 Maurice Edwards OBE KHC
- 1944–1949 John Jagoe CBE KHC
- 1949–1953 Leslie Wright CBE KHC
- 1953–1959: Alan Giles CB CBE QHC
- 1959–1965 Francis Cocks CB QHC (first Archdeacon for the RAF)
- 1965–1969 Wilfred Payton CB QHC
- 1969–1973 Leonard Ashton CB QHC
- 1973–1980 Hewitt Wilson CB QHC
- 1980–1983 Herbert Stuart CB QHC
- 1983–1988 Glyndwr Renowden CB QHC FRSA
- 1988–1991 Brian Halfpenny CB QHC FRSA
- 1991–1995 Brian Lucas CB QHC FRSA
- 1995–1998 Robin Turner CB DL QHC AKC
- 1998–2001 Peter Bishop CB QHC FRSA
- 2001–2006 Ron Hesketh CB QHC FRGS
- 2006–2009 Peter Mills CB QHC (Church of Scotland)
  - Archdeacons for the Royal Air Force:
  - 2006 onwards: Ray Pentland CB QHC
- 2009–2014 (ret.): Ray Pentland
- 2014 – 2018 Jonathan Chaffey CB QHC
- 2018–2022 (ret.): John Ellis CB QHC
- 2022–present: Giles Legood MBE KHC AKC

== World faith chaplains ==
The Royal Air Force Chaplains Branch has 5 world faith chaplains as of October 2021:

- Flt Lt. Mandeep Kaur (Sikh)
- Mr Krishan Attri (Hindu)
- Sqn Ldr. Imam Ali Omar (Muslim)
- Dr Sunil Kariyakarawana (Buddhist)
- Rabbi Reuben Livingstone CF (Jewish)

== Central Church of the Royal Air Force ==
St Clement Danes Church is the Central Church of the Royal Air Force located in the City of Westminster, London. For generations, members of the Royal Air Force family have enjoyed services of Holy Matrimony and Baptisms. Memorial and funeral serves have taken special place. These remain a strong feature today. The church holds the Books of Remembrance to all those who have died in service in the Royal Air Force. The Friends of St Clement Danes support the work and ministry of the Central Church of the Royal Air Force. The Friend's Patron-in-Chief is Prince Richard, Duke of Gloucester.

=== Resident Chaplain, St Clement Danes ===
The following have served as Resident Chaplain of St Clement Danes:

- 1958–1959 Gerald Groves OBE QHC
- 1959–1960 Hugh Rees QHC
- 1960–1965 Tom Ryder QHC
- 1965–1969 Leonard Ashton CB QHC
- 1969–1971 Walter Pellant OBE QHC AKC
- 1971–1976 Thomas Thomas QHC
- 1976–1979 Glyndwr Renowden CB QHC FRSA
- 1979–1982 Dennis Clark MBE QHC
- 1982–1984 Raymond Hubble QHC
- 1984–1987 Roger Kenward QHC
- 1987–1989 Michael Stokes QHC
- 1989–1991 William Sirr QHC
- 1991–1993 Anthony Goode QHC
- 1993–1995 George McAvoy MBE QHC
- 1995–1997 Peter Bishop CB QHC FRSA
- 1997–2002 David Mackenzie QHC FRSA
- 2002–2005 Christopher Long MBE QHC
- 2005–2009 Thomas Lee QHC AKC FRSA
- 2008–2010 Canon Adrian Gatrill
- 2010–2022 David Osborn QHC AKC
- 2022–present Mark Perry MStJ FRSA

== Gallery ==
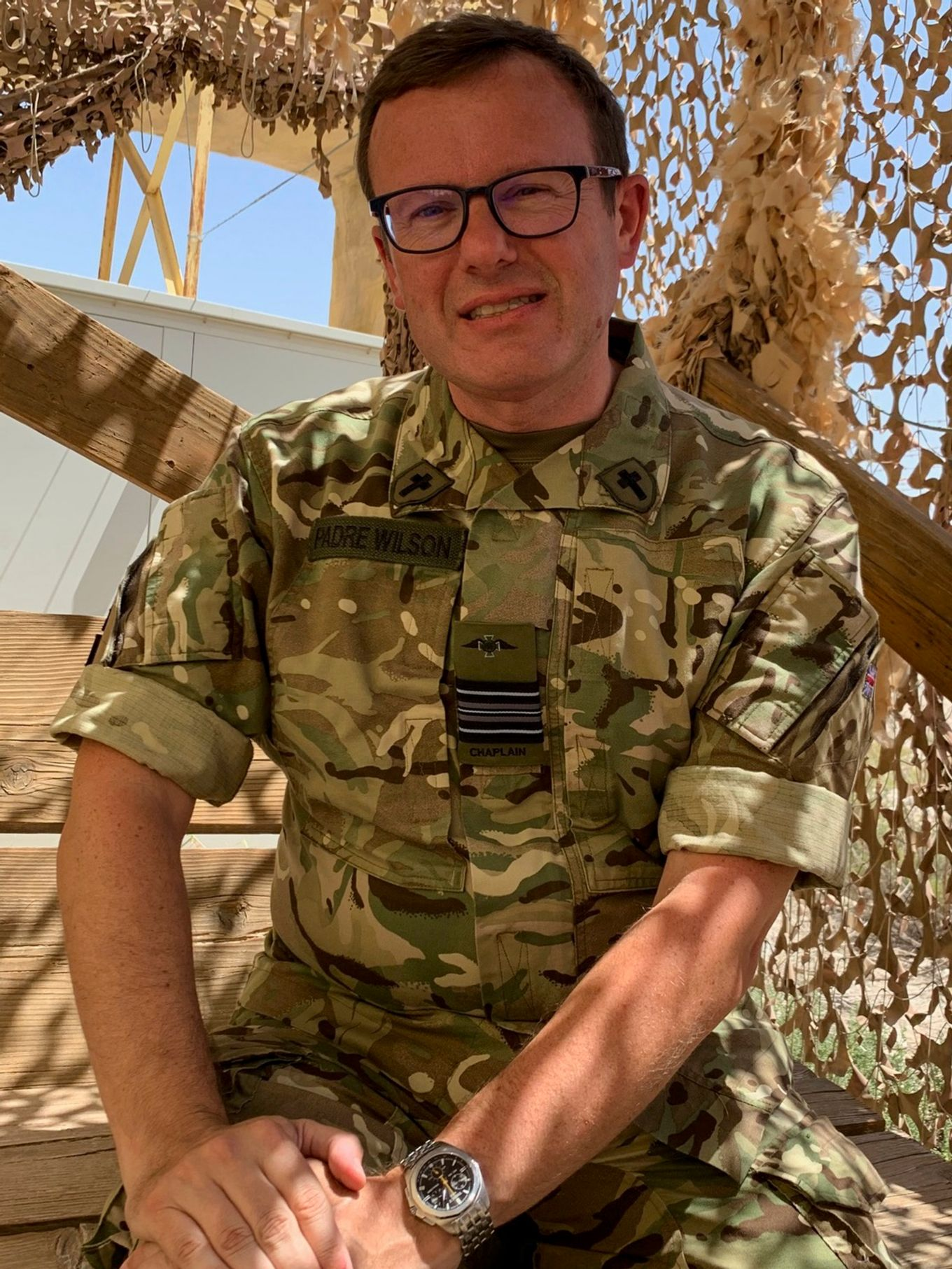
A padre in combat uniform

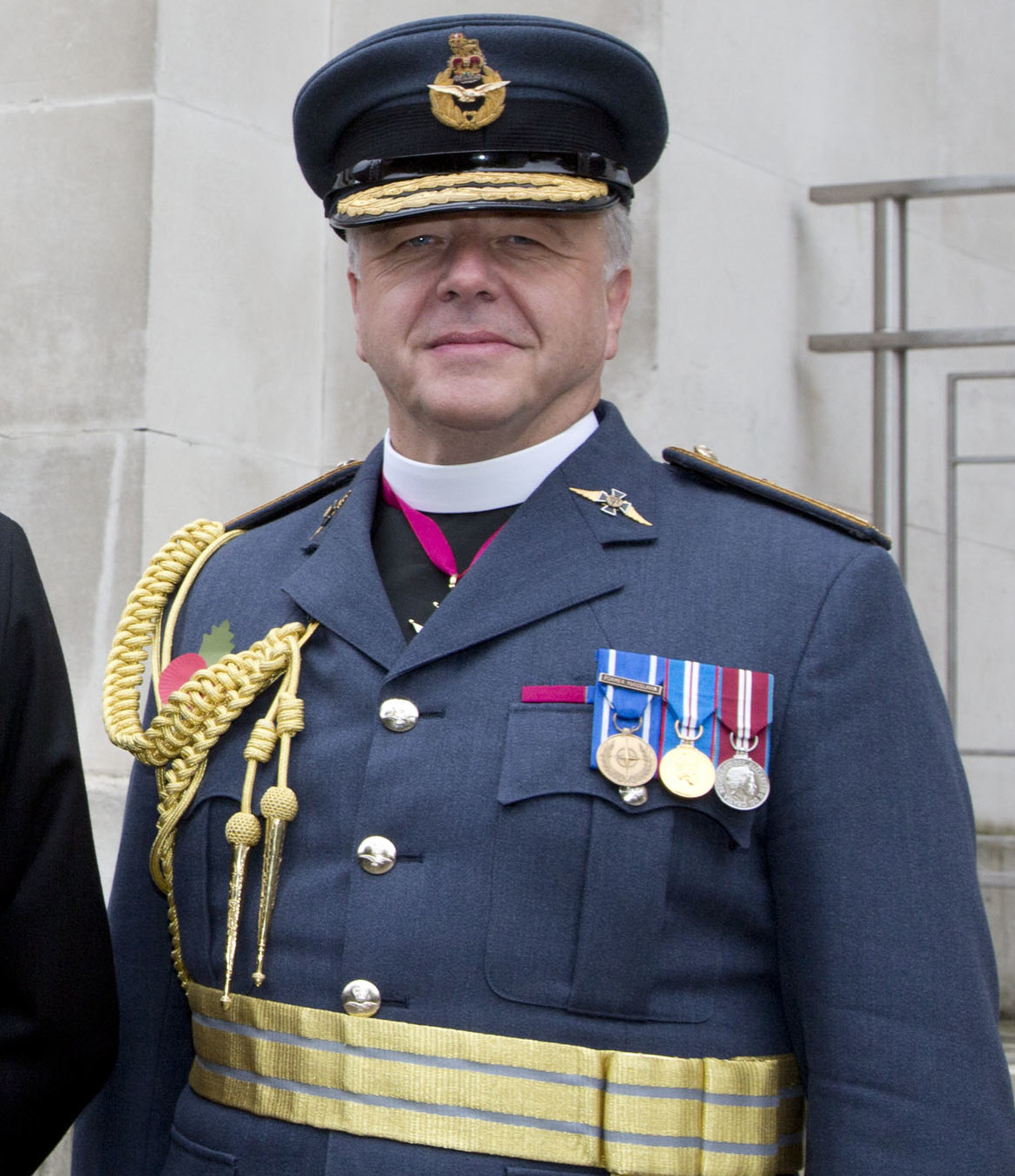
Ray Pentland in service dress

== See also ==
- RAF Chapel
- Royal Army Chaplains' Department
- Royal Navy Chaplaincy Service
- Bishop to the Forces (Anglican)
- Bishopric of the Forces (Roman Catholic)
- Military chaplain § United Kingdom
- Chaplain
- Category:Royal Air Force chaplains

== Footnotes ==
=== Bibliography ===
- Pitchfork, Graham (Air Cdre (Ret'd)). The Royal Air Force Day by Day. Stroud, UK: History Press, 2008. ISBN 978-0-7509-4309-3.
