= Leonard Ashton =

English Anglican bishop (1915–2001)

The Right Reverend Leonard Ashton CB QHC
- Bishop in Cyprus and the Gulf
- Church: Episcopal Church in Jerusalem and the Middle East
- Diocese: Diocese of Cyprus and the Gulf
- In office: 1976 to 1981
- Successor: Henry Moore
- Other post: Chaplain-in-Chief of the RAF (1969 to 1973)

Orders
- Ordination: 1942 (deacon); 1943 (priest)
- Consecration: 1974

Personal details
- Born: 27 June 1915
- Died: 19 January 2001 (aged 85)
- Denomination: Anglicanism
- Education: Tyndale Hall, Bristol

Leonard James Ashton, CB, QHC (27 June 1915 – 19 January 2001) was an English Anglican bishop and military chaplain. He was the inaugural Bishop in Cyprus and the Gulf, serving from 1976 to 1983. He had previously spent most of his ordained ministry serving in the Chaplains Branch of the Royal Air Force, and rose to become its Chaplain-in-Chief (1969 to 1973).

== Early life and education ==
Leonard Ashton was born on 27 June 1915 to Henry Ashton and Sarah Ashton (née Ing). From 1940 to 1942, he trained for ordained ministry at Tyndale Hall, Bristol, an evangelical Anglican theological college.

== Ordained ministry ==
=== Early ministry ===
Leonard Ashton was ordained in the Church of England as a deacon in 1942 and as a priest in 1943. From 1942 to 1945, he served his curacy in Cheadle in the Diocese of Chester.

=== Military service ===
On 15 May 1945, Leonard Ashton was granted an emergency commission in the Chaplains Branch of the Royal Air Force (RAF) and granted the relative rank of squadron leader. He served in north Wales during 1945, before being posted to Air Headquarters Malaya and Singapore in 1946. From 1947 to 1948, he served in Japan. In 1948, he returned to England and was posted to RAF Halton in Buckinghamshire. On 4 May 1949, he was granted a short service commission in the relative rank of squadron leader with seniority from 15 May 1945. From 1949 to 1950, he served at RAF Feltwell in Norfolk.

Leonard Ashton was transferred to a permanent commission on 21 June 1950. From 1950 to 1953, he served as a lecturer and chaplain at the RAF Chaplaincy School near Cheltenham, Gloucestershire. Then, from 1953 to 1954, he was posted to Air Headquarters Iraq. From 1954 to 1960, he served at RAF College, Cranwell, the Royal Air Force's main officer training establishment. On 15 May 1959, he was promoted to the relative rank of wing commander. From 1960 to 1961, he once more served abroad having been assigned to British Forces Arabian Peninsular and Middle East Command.

In 1962, Leonard Ashton returned to England and was promoted to Assistant Chaplain-in-Chief. From 1962 to 1965, he served at RAF Training Command. From 1965 to 1969, he was the resident chaplain (i.e. priest-in-charge) of St Clement Danes in London, the central church of the Royal Air Force. In 1969, he was appointed Chaplain-in-Chief of the RAF and promoted to the relative rank of air vice-marshal. As the most senior Anglican chaplain, he was also appointed Archdeacon for the Royal Air Force in the Church of England.

After nearly 30 years serving in the Royal Air Force as a chaplain, Ashton retired from the military in 1973.

=== Episcopal ministry ===
In 1974, Ashton was consecrated a bishop. From 1974 to 1976, he served as an assistant bishop in the Diocese of Jerusalem. In 1976, the Anglican presence in the region was reorganised: this resulted in the creation of the Episcopal Church in Jerusalem and the Middle East and four new dioceses. One of these new dioceses was the Diocese of Cyprus and the Gulf, and Ashton was appointed its first diocesan bishop as bishop in Cyprus and the Gulf. He was also an Episcopal Canon of St George's Cathedral, Jerusalem from 1976 to 1983. He retired from full-time ordained ministry in 1983, and was succeeded by Henry Moore as bishop in Cyprus and the Gulf.

With retirement, Ashton returned to England and was appointed an honorary assistant bishop of the Diocese of Oxford. He died on 19 January 2001 in Chesham, Buckinghamshire.

== Honours ==
In the 1970 New Year Honours, Ashton was appointed Companion of the Order of the Bath (CB).

Military offices
Preceded by Wilfred Payton	Chaplain-in-Chief of the RAF; 1969 to 1973	Succeeded by Hewitt Wilson
Anglican Communion titles
New title	Bishop in Cyprus and the Gulf; 1976 to 1981	Succeeded by Henry Moore
