= Robin Turner (priest) =

British Anglican priest (1942–2023)

Peter Robin Turner, CB, DL, QHC, AKC (8 March 1942 – 24 October 2023) was a British Anglican priest and military chaplain. From 1995 to 1998, he served as Chaplain-in-Chief, and thereby head of the Royal Air Force Chaplains Branch, and Archdeacon for the Royal Air Force.

Turner was educated at Dulwich College and King's College London. After a curacy in Crediton he served the RAF from 1970 to 1998. He was an Honorary Chaplain to the Queen from 1991 to 1998.

Turner died on 24 October 2023, at the age of 81.

Military offices
Preceded by Brian Humphrey Lucas	Chaplain-in-Chief of the Royal Air Force; 1995–1998	Succeeded by Peter Bishop
