= Peter Bishop (priest) =

British Anglican priest

- Born: Anthony Peter Bishop
- Occupations: Priest and military chaplain

Anthony Peter Bishop, CB, QHC, FRSA (born 24 May 1946) is a British Anglican priest and retired military chaplain. In 1995 to 1998 he was appointed Resident Chaplain of St Clement Danes in London, the central church of the Royal Air Force. From 1998 to 2001, he served as Chaplain-in-Chief, and thereby head of the Royal Air Force Chaplains Branch, and Archdeacon for the Royal Air Force.

Bishop was a civil servant in the Ministry of Transport from 1963 to 1967. After studying at the London College of Divinity and St John's College, Nottingham he was ordained deacon in 1971, and priest in 1972. After a curacy in Beckenham he served with the RAF from 1975 to 2001. He was appointed an Honorary Chaplain to the Queen in 1998.

Military offices
Preceded by Peter Robin Turner	Chaplain-in-Chief of the Royal Air Force; 1998 – 2001	Succeeded by Ronald David Hesketh
