= Brian Halfpenny =

English Anglican priest (1936–2024)

Brian Norman Halfpenny, CB, QHC, FRSA (7 June 1936 – 2 May 2024) was a British Anglican priest and military chaplain. From 1988 to 1991, he served as Chaplain-in-Chief, and thereby head of the Royal Air Force Chaplains Branch, and Archdeacon for the Royal Air Force.

Halfpenny was educated at George Dixon Grammar School, Birmingham; St John's College, Oxford; and Wells Theological College. After a curacy in Melksham he served the RAF from 1965 to 1991. He was Team Rector of Redditch from 1991 to 2001.

Halfpenny died on 2 May 2024, at the age of 87.

Military offices
| Preceded by Glyndwr Renowden | Chaplain-in-Chief of the Royal Air Force; 1988 – 1991 | Succeeded by Brian Lucas |
