= John Raymond Ellis =

John Raymond Ellis may refer to:

- Jack Ellis (politician) (born John Raymond Ellis; 1929–1994), Canadian politician
- John Ellis (chaplain) (born 1968), British Anglican priest and RAF chaplain
- John R. Ellis (born 1955), American film maker and special effects artist
