= Gapan (disambiguation) =

Gapan is a city in the Philippines.

Gapan may also refer to:

- GAPAN, the Guild of Air Pilots and Air Navigators, now known as The Honourable Company of Air Pilots
- Kapan, (Armenian: Ղափան), formerly known as Ghapan, a town in Armenia
