= St Clement Danes =

Coordinates: 51.513107°N 0.113898°W

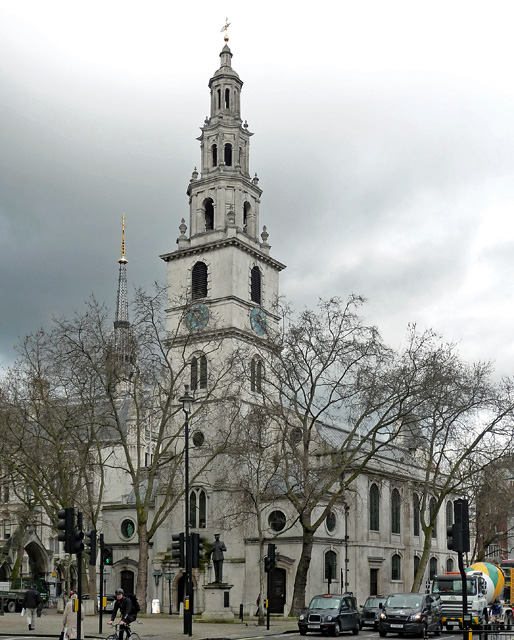
- St Clement Danes
- OS grid reference: TQ 30976 81040
- Country: England
- Denomination: Church of England
- Churchmanship: Anglo-Catholic and Ecumenical RAF
- Website: stclementdanesraf.org

Architecture
- Heritage designation: Grade I
- Architect: Christopher Wren
- Style: Baroque
- Years built: several, most recently 1682

Administration
- Diocese: Diocese of London

St Clement Danes is an Anglican church in the City of Westminster, London. It is near the 19th-century Royal Courts of Justice on the Strand in Aldwych. Although the first church on the site was reputedly founded in the 9th century by the Danes, the current building replaced the medieval church building and was completed in 1682 by celebrated architect Sir Christopher Wren. Wren's building was gutted by Luftwaffe bombing raids during the Blitz and not restored until 1958, when it was adapted to its current function as the central church of the Royal Air Force.

The church might be the one featured in the nursery rhyme "Oranges and Lemons" and the bells do indeed play that tune every day at 9 am, noon, 3pm and 6pm—as reported in 1940 the church's playing of the tune was interrupted during the Second World War due to Nazi bombing. However, St Clement's, Eastcheap, in the City of London, is also possibly the church from the rhyme. St Clement Danes is known as one of the two 'Island Churches' in The Strand (centred in the thoroughfare), the other being St Mary-le-Strand.

Bells of St Clement's
Bells playing Oranges and Lemons

== History ==
=== Connection to the Danes ===
There are several possible theories as to the connection between the Danes and the origins of the church. A popular theory is that in the 9th century, the Danes colonized the village of Aldwych on the river between the City of London and the future site of Westminster. This was during the Danelaw and London was on the dividing line between the English and the Danes. The Danes founded a church at Aldwych, hence the final part of its name (in Latin it was known as Ecclesia Clementes Danorum). However; Aldwych is an English name and doesn't seem to have any Danish influence. An alternative view is that after Alfred the Great had driven the Danes out of the City of London and they had been required to accept Christianity, Alfred stipulated the building of the church. In either case, being a seafaring people, the Danes named the church they built after St Clement, patron saint of mariners.

Other possible ideas are that in the 11th century after Siward, Earl of Northumbria, killed the Dane Tosti, Earl of Huntingdon, and his men, the deceased were buried in a field near London and a memorial church was subsequently built to honour the memory of the Danes. Also possible is that the Danish connection was reinforced by a massacre recorded in the Jómsvíkinga saga when a group of unarmed Danes who had gathered for a church service were killed. The 12th-century historian William of Malmesbury wrote that the Danes burnt the church on the site of St Clement Danes before they were later slain in the vicinity. Another possible explanation for the name is that, as King Harold I "Harefoot" is recorded as having been buried in the church in March 1040, the church acquired its name on account of Harold's Danish connections.

=== Medieval church ===
The church was first rebuilt by William the Conqueror, and then again later in the Middle Ages.

A new chancel was built over part of the churchyard in 1608, at a cost of more than £1,000, and various repairs and improvements to the tower and other parts of the church cost £496 in 1618.

Shortly after the Great Fire of 1666, further repairs to the steeple were attempted, but these were found impractical, and the whole tower was rebuilt from the foundations. Work was completed in 1669. Soon afterwards it was decided that the rest of the church was in such a poor state that it too should be completely rebuilt. Wren employed Edward Pierce (with whom he worked on many churches) to create the ornate interior.

=== Seventeenth-century rebuilding ===
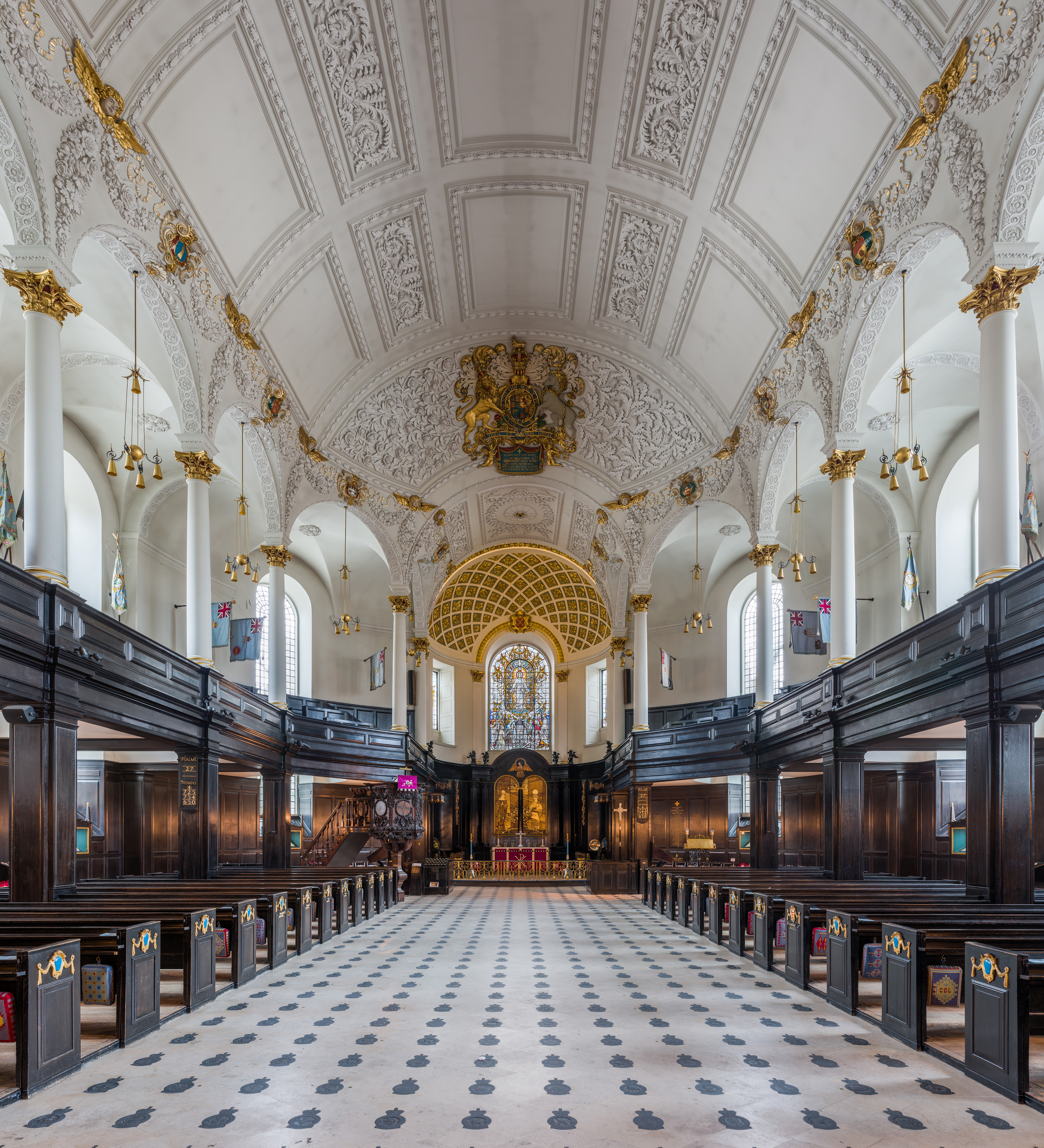
Interior of the church, looking east

St Clement Danes was rebuilt between 1680 and 1682 to a design by Sir Christopher Wren, incorporating the existing tower which was reclad. The new church was constructed from Portland stone, with an apse at the east end. A steeple was added to the tower in 1719 by James Gibbs.

The interior has galleries on three sides supported by square pillars, continued above gallery level as Corinthian columns, supporting, in turn, a barrel-vaulted ceiling. Wren used the same scheme again at St James's Church, Piccadilly, begun two years later. Above the galleries, each bay has a cross vault, allowing the building to be lit from large round-headed windows on the upper level.

=== Later history ===
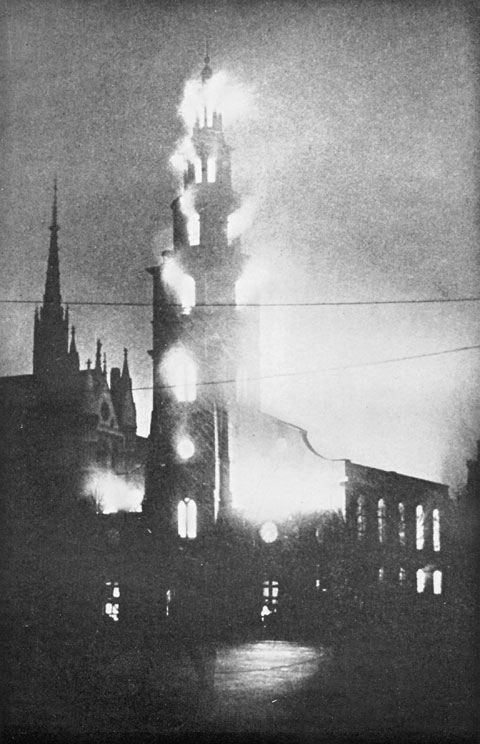
St Clement Danes ablaze on 10 May 1941

William Webb Ellis, often credited with the invention of Rugby football in 1823, was once rector of the church and is commemorated by a memorial tablet.

In 1844, St Clement Danes School was constructed on land on Houghton Road, Holborn which the churchwardens had purchased in 1552. It opened in 1862 and remained there until 1928, then moved to Shepherd's Bush until 1975, when it was finally re-established as a comprehensive school in Chorleywood, Hertfordshire.

The church was almost destroyed by Luftwaffe bombing raids during the Blitz on 10 May 1941. The outer walls, the tower and Gibbs's steeple survived the raids, but the interior was gutted by fire. As a result of the blaze, the church's ten bells fell to the ground. Subsequently, they were placed in storage and were recast after the war.

=== As the Central Church of the Royal Air Force ===
Following an appeal for funds by the Royal Air Force, the church was completely restored under the supervision of Sam Lloyd. In 1958, St Clement Danes Church was reconsecrated in the presence of Queen Elizabeth II and Prince Philip, Duke of Edinburgh as the Central Church of the Royal Air Force.

As part of the rebuilding, the following inscription was added under the restored Royal coat of arms:

AEDIFICAVIT CHR WREN
AD MDCLXXII
DIRUERUNT AERII BELLI
FULMINA AD MCMXLI
RESTITUIT REGINAE CLASSIS
AERONAUTICA AD MCMLVIII

which may be translated as: "Christopher Wren built it 1672. The thunderbolts of aerial warfare destroyed it 1941. The Royal Air Force restored it 1958." (There is an error in the inscription, as the church was completed in 1682 and not 1672.)

== Current worship and services ==
The church is known for its excellent Anglican choral tradition of Eucharist and Matins (on Sundays, at 1100) At its roots it is Anglican and is also known for its ecumenical representation of the RAF Chaplains Branch. Services are regularly held and open to the public. Special services take place to commemorate prominent occasions of the RAF and its associated organisations. Royal Air Force Music Services provides first class musical support. The King's Colour Squadron, formerly the Queen's Colour Squadron, attends at events and ceremonies charged with the safe-keeping of the King's Colour for the Royal Air Force and other ceremonial duties at the RAF's central church.

- Saint Clement is commemorated every April at St Clement Danes, a modern clementine custom/revival. The Reverend William Pennington-Bickford initiated the service in 1919 to celebrate the restoration of the famous church bells and carillon, which he'd had altered to ring out the popular nursery rhyme. This special service for children ends with the distribution of oranges and lemons to the boys and girls. Formerly William Bickford, William Pennington-Bickford (died 1941) was Rector from 1910 to 1941 and he and his wife Louisa became known for their devotion to the welfare of the parish. (He had succeeded his father-in-law in the benefice.)
- In 2008, the church was one of the venues where people gathered as part of the Armed Forces Day of Prayer.
- In 2013 a short service was held for Prime Minister Margaret Thatcher. The coffin was then transferred to a gun carriage drawn by the King's Troop, Royal Horse Artillery. The cortège then continued along Fleet Street towards St Paul’s Cathedral.
- On the 100th anniversary of the foundation of the RAF, celebrations took place at St Clement Danes.
- In 2025, St Clement Danes hosted a special service marking the 25th anniversary of the lifting of the ban on LGBTQ+ personnel serving in His Majesty's Armed Forces. The service was organised and introduced by the Resident Chaplain, the Reverend Mark Perry. The sermon was delivered by the Deputy Chaplain-in-Chief Personnel, the Reverend Ruth Hake, and the Chaplain-in-Chief of the Royal Air Force, Air Vice-Marshal Giles Legood, together with the Reverend Andy Chapman, Padre to the LGBTQ+ defence community, also took part in the service. The service was broadcast on BBC Radio 4’s Sunday Worship on 23 February 2025.

== Community of the Cross of Nails ==
The Central Church of the RAF is a member of Coventry Cathedral Community of the Cross of Nails. The three guiding principles are Healing the wounds of history, Learning to live with difference and celebrate diversity, and Building a culture of justice and peace. The Community of the Cross of Nails is guided by the words 'Father Forgive', and praying the Litany of Reconciliation. "The Cross of Nails is a symbol of hope and friendship in the aftermath of conflict." Archbishop Justin Welby.

== The Friends of St Clement Danes ==
The Friends of St Clement Danes support the work and ministry of the Central Church of the Royal Air Force. The Friends' Patron-in-Chief is Prince Richard, Duke of Gloucester, and its Patron is Air Chief Marshall Sir Richard Knighton Chief of the Air Staff

== Resident Chaplains ==
St Clement Danes, the Central Church of the Royal Air Force is led by a Royal Air Force Chaplain appointed by the Chaplain-in-Chief. In 1958, Gerald Groves became the inaugural Resident Chaplain for the church's re-consecration in the presence of Queen Elizabeth II following the destruction caused by the Second World War.

- 1958–1959 Gerald Groves OBE QHC
- 1959–1960 Hugh Rees QHC
- 1960–1965 Tom Ryder QHC
- 1965–1969 Leonard Ashton CB QHC
- 1969–1971 Walter Pellant OBE QHC AKC
- 1971–1976 Thomas Thomas QHC
- 1976–1979 Glyndwr Renowden CB QHC FRSA
- 1979–1982 Dennis Clark MBE QHC
- 1982–1984 Raymond Hubble QHC
- 1984–1987 Roger Kenward QHC
- 1987–1989 Michael Stokes QHC
- 1989–1991 William Sirr QHC
- 1991–1993 Anthony Goode QHC
- 1993–1995 George McAvoy MBE QHC
- 1995–1997 Peter Bishop CB QHC FRSA
- 1997–2002 David Mackenzie QHC FRSA
- 2002–2005 Christopher Long MBE QHC
- 2005–2009 Thomas Lee QHC AKC FRSA
- 2008–2010 Canon Adrian Gatrill
- 2010–2022 David Osborn QHC AKC
- 2022–2025 Mark Perry MStJ FRSA
- 2025-2026 Ashley Mitchell KHC
- 2026–present Dr David Richardson

== Directors of Music ==
- 1958–1992 Martindale Sidwell FRCO
- 1992–2015 Peter Long FRCO
- 2015–present Simon Over FRCO

Assistant Directors of Music

- 2016-present Charlie Newsome-Hubbard FRCO

== Royal Air Force features ==
There are features throughout and outside the building commemorating people and units of the RAF.

=== Statues ===
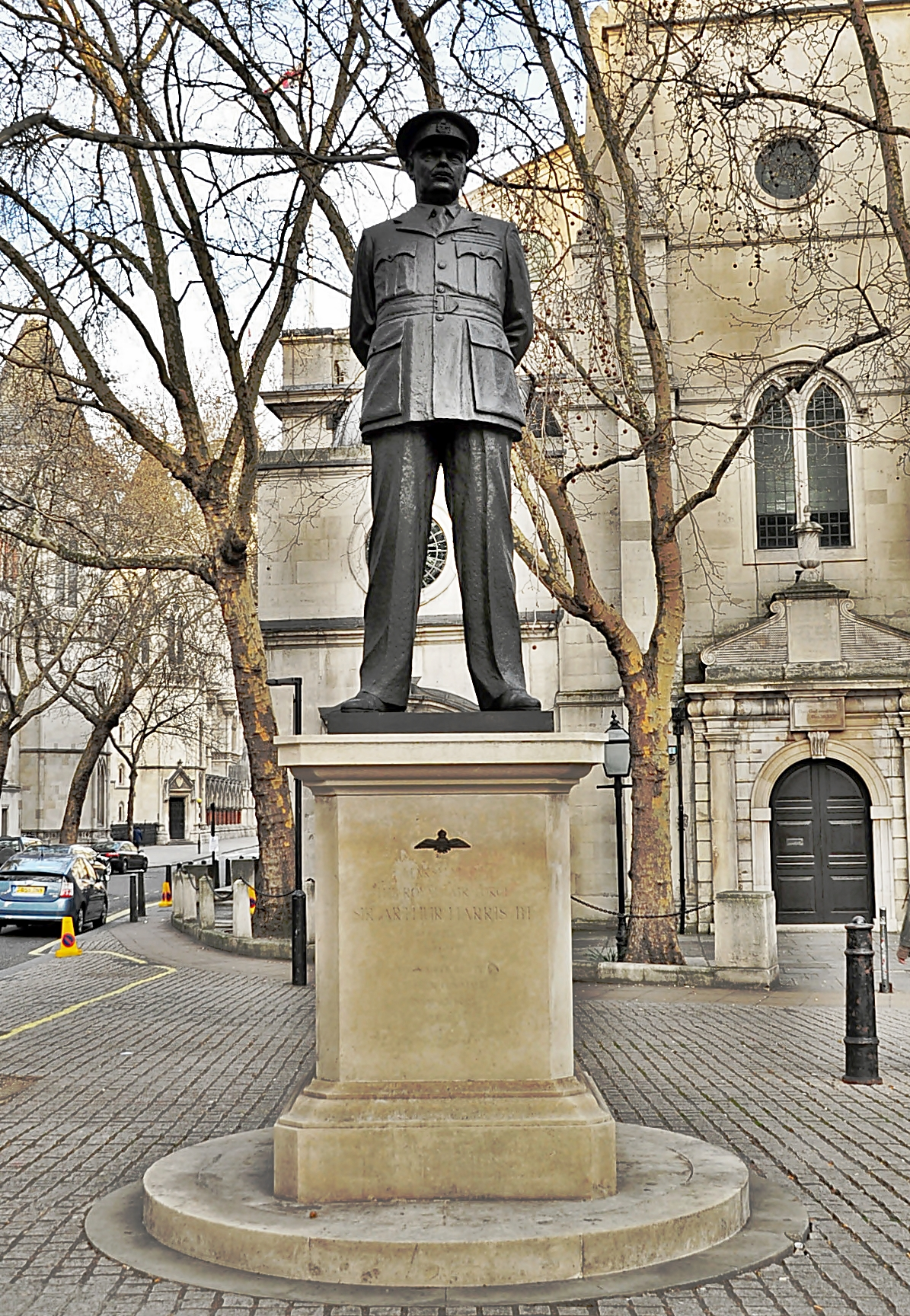
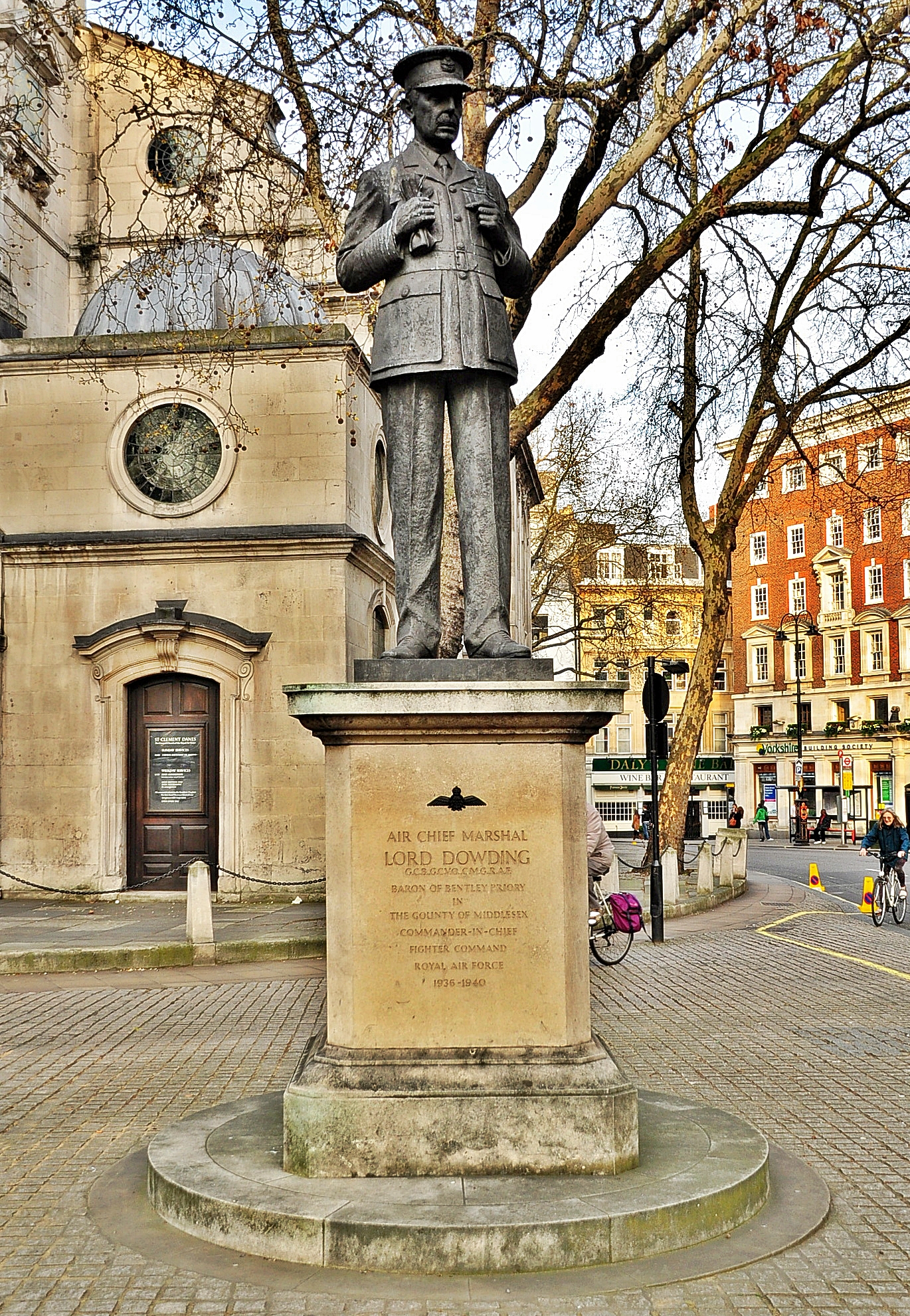
Statues of Sir Arthur Harris (left), and Hugh Dowding, 1st Baron Dowding, outside St Clement Danes

Outside the church stand statues of two of the RAF's wartime leaders, Arthur "Bomber" Harris and Hugh Dowding, both by the sculptor Faith Winter.

The erection of the statue of Harris was controversial due to his responsibility for the bombing of Dresden and other bombing campaigns against German cities. Despite protests from Germany, including from the mayors of Dresden and Hamburg as well as some in Britain, the Bomber Harris Trust (an RAF veterans' organisation) erected a statue of him outside St Clement Danes in 1992. It was unveiled by Queen Elizabeth the Queen Mother who looked surprised when she was jeered by protesters. The line on the statue reads "The Nation owes them all an immense debt". The statue had to be guarded by policemen day and night for some time as it was frequently sprayed with graffiti.

=== Memorials and Honours ===
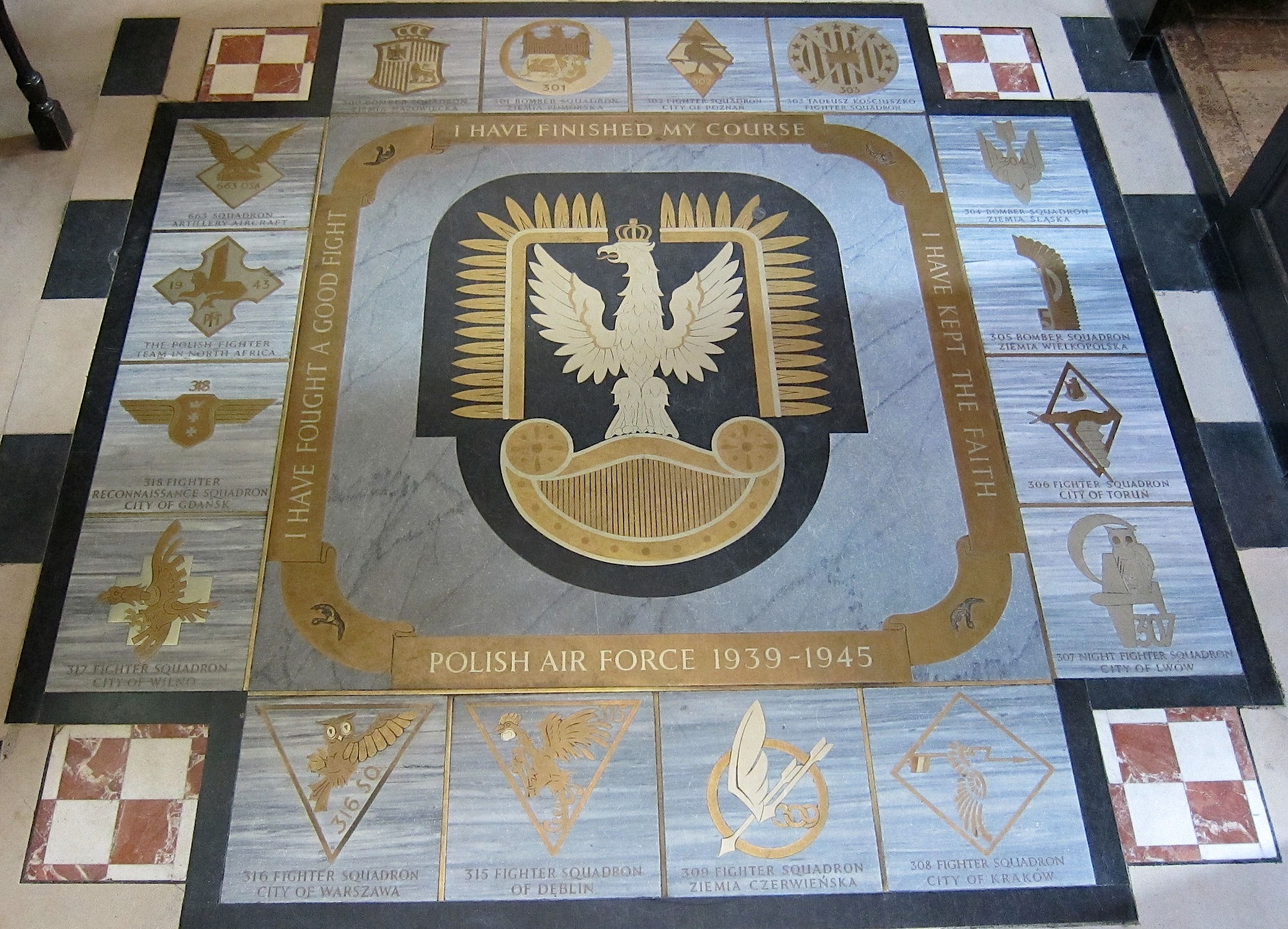
The Polish Air Forces memorial on the floor of the church

The floor of the church, of Welsh slate, is inscribed with the badges of over 800 RAF commands, groups, stations, squadrons and other formations. Near the entrance door is a ring of the badges of Commonwealth air forces, surrounding the badge of the RAF.

A memorial to the Polish airmen and squadrons who fought in the defence of the United Kingdom and the liberation of Europe in the Second World War is positioned on the floor of the north aisle.

Books of Remembrance listing the names of all the RAF personnel who have died in service, as well as those American airmen based in the United Kingdom who died during the Second World War.

Near the altar are plaques listing the names of RAF, Royal Flying Corps, Royal Naval Air Service, and Commonwealth personnel awarded the Victoria Cross and the George Cross.

=== Burials ===
King Harold Harefoot is recorded as being buried here, although there is no memorial.

There are memorials to several people associated with the RAF whose ashes are buried in St Clement Danes, including

- Sir Archibald McIndoe, CBE FRCS (1900–1960), plastic surgeon who worked for the RAF during the Second World War
- Marshal of the Royal Air Force Lord Tedder, GCB (1890–1967)
- Marshal of the Royal Air Force Lord Douglas of Kirtleside, GCB, MC, DFC (1893–1969)

=== Donations and artefacts ===
In the gallery hang the Queen's Colours and Standards of active RAF squadrons, (these Colours/Standards having been retired and replaced by newer versions), along with standards of several now disbanded squadrons plus the Royal Banner of the Royal Observer Corps, (most standards of disbanded squadrons hang in the rotunda of the RAF College Cranwell).

Pulpits, pews and chairs in the body of the church have been presented by various people, including past chiefs of the Air Staff, Sir Douglas Bader and the Guinea Pig Club. The armorial achievement of Lord Trenchard is displayed above the main entrance at the west end of the church. The lectern was a gift from the Royal Australian Air Force, the Cross from the Air Training Corps, the altar from the Dutch embassy. The church's font was donated by the Royal Norwegian Air Force, and is located in the crypt. The Paschal Candle was given by the Royal Belgian Air Force. Information on the donated organ is to be found in the next section. The Order of the Garter Banner of MRAF Lord Portal of Hungerford was transferred from St George's Chapel, Windsor Castle to St Clement Danes following his death in 1971.

== Rectors of St Clement Danes ==
John Diprose's history of St Clement Danes gives a list of rectors since 1325.

- 1540–1557† John Rixman (also Archdeacon of Cornwall)
- 1557–1559† Ralph Jackson
- 1559–1589† William Harward
- 1589–1602† Richard Webster (also Archdeacon of Middlesex)
- 1602–1617† John Layfield
- 1617–1634† Roger Bates
- 1634–1678† Richard Dukeson (sequestered in 1643, his place taken by Daniel Evans, Richard Vines, and George Masterson; Dukeson was restored in 1660)
- 1678–1708† Gregory Hascard (also Dean of Windsor from 1684)
- 1708–1719† William Forster
- 1720–1721 Thomas Blomer
- 1721–1773† Thomas Blackwell
- 1773–1786† John Burrows
- 1786–1795† George Berkeley (son of Bishop Berkeley, husband of Eliza Berkeley)
- 1795–1807 Henry Garrioch Vernon
- 1807–1843† William Gurney
- 1843–1855 William Webb Ellis
- 1855–1860 Skinner Chart Mason
- 1860–1869 Richard Henry Killick
- 1869–1879 Robert James Simpson
- 1879–1887 John Lindsay
- 1887–1889 George Sutton Flack
- 1889–1910† J. J. H. Septimus Pennington (surnamed Sparrow until 1886)
- 1910–1941† William Pennington Bickford (son-in-law of Septimus Pennington)

† Rector died in post

== Organ ==
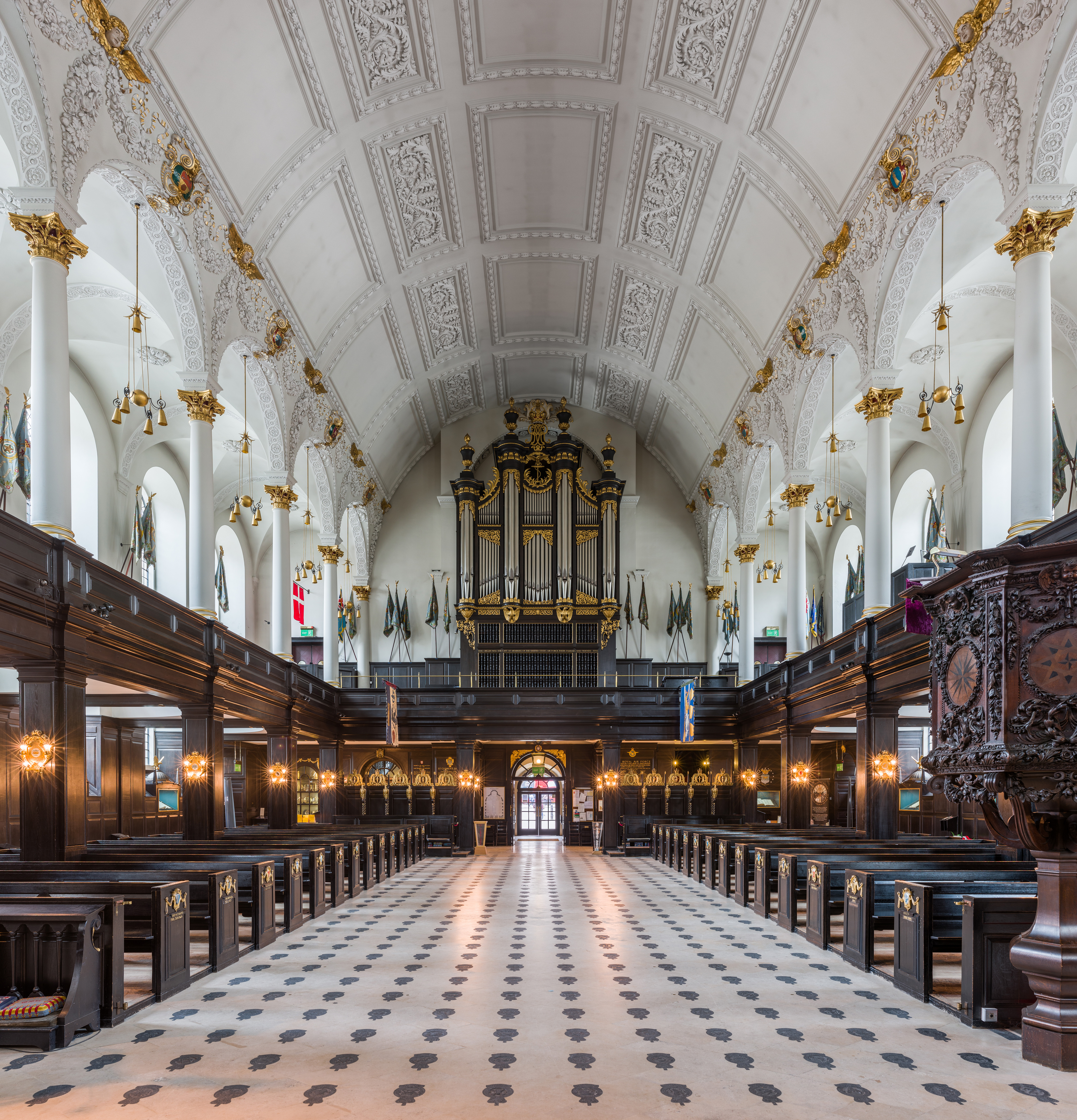
The organ of 1958

The earliest records of an organ are from 1690, when an organ was installed by Bernard Smith. This went through several rebuildings over the next 250 years, but was finally destroyed in the Second World War. A new organ, situated facing the altar in the gallery, was installed by the builder Harrison and Harrison in 1958. This was a gift from the United States Air Force. The case was made as a replica of the Father Smith organ previously destroyed. A specification of the organ can be found on the National Pipe Organ Register.

=== Organists ===
- Anthony Young 1707–1747
- Samuel Howard 1747–1782
- Thomas Smart 1782–1803
- John Purkis 1804–1849
- Frederick Scotson Clark
- Edwin Matthew Lott 1860–1864
- Charles Edward Stephens 1864–1869
- Edmund Barnes 1869–1882
- Charles King Hall 1880–1885
- F. J. Marchment
- C. Borrow c. 1921
- D. Rayner Smith

== Schools ==
The church established both a primary and a secondary school.

The St Clement Danes CE Primary School (established in 1700) is located nearby on Drury Lane in Covent Garden.

A secondary school was first located in Holborn (1862–1928) near to the church, then moved to Hammersmith as a state school run by the Inner London Education Authority as St Clement Danes Grammar School (1928–1975). It then relocated to Chorleywood, Hertfordshire, initially as a comprehensive school (1975–2011), and thereafter as an Academy as 'St Clement Danes School'.

== Masonic Lodge ==
In 1871 a Masonic Lodge was consecrated at the request of several local Freemasons, who wanted to meet in a local Lodge instead of having to travel out of the parish. The petition was accepted by the then Grand Master, the Earl de Grey and Ripon; accordingly the St Clement Danes Lodge was formed and granted a Warrant of Constitution, along with the registration number 1351 on the register of the United Grand Lodge of England. The first meeting of the Lodge was on 4 May 1871 at the King's Head public house at 265 Strand, and the Rector of the Church, the Reverend R J Simpson, was the first Chaplain of the Lodge. The Lodge held meetings at various hotels and restaurants within the parish for many years, before amending its Constitution to allow it to meet at Freemasons' Hall, Great Queen Street, London, where it still meets today.

== In fiction ==
The statue of Dr Samuel Johnson at the eastern end of the church land, comes to life as the character "Dictionary", in Charlie Fletcher's 2006 children's book about unLondon, Stoneheart.

The 1949 novel Nineteen Eighty-Four has the protagonist encountering a picture of the church from prior to the war – a building which he has known only as a ruin, never having been rebuilt. (The plot of the book, written in 1948, assumes a Third World War breaking out in the early 1950s, followed by a period of deep crisis and civil war in Britain and the rise of a totalitarian regime banning all religion; thus, no one in this future had any reason to rebuild the church).

== Notable people ==
- Harold Harefoot King of England died 1040 AD
- Richard Puttenham, the possible author of The Arte of English Poesie and brother of George Puttenham (writer and literary critic), was buried in St Clement Danes on 2 July 1601
- John Layfield, one of the translators of the King James Version of the Bible, Rector from 1602 to 1617
- Thomas Otway, buried in the churchyard on 16 April 1685
- Pierre Radisson, French fur trader and explorer and a driving force behind the Hudson's Bay Company, was buried in the churchyard in July 1710.
- Anthony Young, organist at the church from 1707 to 1747
- Charles Christian Reisen, gem-engraver, born in the parish of St Clement Danes in 1680
- James Burton, the pre-eminent property developer of Georgian London, and father of the architect Decimus Burton, married in the church on 1 March 1783.
- The Twinings tea family lived and did business in the parish and, consequently, many members of the Twining family were baptised in the church, including the social reformer Louisa Twining in 1820.
- James Weddell, discoverer of the Weddell Sea in Antarctica, was buried in the churchyard in 1834.
- Katherine de Roet, daughter of a Herald, mistress and then third wife of John of Gaunt, Duke of Lancaster, mother of the Beauforts and ancestor of Tudor and Stuart monarchs, married Sir Hugh Swynford here in c.1366
- Margaret Thatcher's funeral procession paused here, where her coffin was transferred from the hearse to a gun carriage before being taken to St Paul's Cathedral.
- William Ewart Gladstone – the Gladstone Memorial stands in the plaza in front of the church.

== See also ==
- List of churches and cathedrals of London
- List of Christopher Wren churches in London
