= Renowden =

Renowden is a surname. Notable people with the surname include:

- Glyndwr Renowden (1929–2002), Welsh Anglican priest
- Raymond Renowden (1923–2000), Welsh Anglican priest and author
