= Brian Lucas =

British Anglican priest (born 1940)

Brian Humphrey Lucas CB QHC FRSA (born 20 January 1940) is a British Anglican priest and retired military chaplain.

From 1991 to 1995, he served as Chaplain-in-Chief, and thereby head of the Royal Air Force Chaplains Branch, and Archdeacon for the Royal Air Force.

== Education and Ordination ==
Lucas was born in Port Talbot, South Wales. He studied Humanities at St David's College, Lampeter (BA 1962) where he was elected college representative to the NUS and was involved in the college magazine. He then studied Theology at St Stephen's House, Oxford.

After ordination as a deacon in 1964 and as a priest in 1965, he served on the staff of Llandaff Cathedral until 1967 when he moved to the parish of Neath. At this time he became honorary Chaplain to 334 (Neath) Squadron of the Air Training Corps. He was commissioned as a chaplain in the RAF in 1970.

== RAF Chaplaincy ==
After chaplaincies in Cornwall, Malta and East Anglia, he was Staff Chaplain to the Chaplain-in-Chief at the MOD from 1979 until 1982. Following a tour in Cyprus, he became the Senior Chaplain at the RAF College Cranwell in 1985. He was appointed Assistant Chaplain-in-Chief and Command Chaplain RAF Germany from 1987 until 1989 when he became Assistant Chaplain-in-Chief and Command Chaplain RAF Support Command.

== Post-RAF Religious Career ==
Lucas was an Honorary Chaplain to Her Majesty the Queen from 1989 to 1995.

He became Canon of Lincoln in 1991 (Emeritus from 2003) and was appointed Chaplain-in-Chief and Archdeacon to the RAF in the same year (Emeritus from 1996).

In January 1993 he was made a Companion of the Order of the Bath.

From 1996 to 2003, he was Rector of the Caythorpe Benefice in the Diocese of Lincoln; this comprised the parishes of Caythorpe, Fulbeck and Carlton Scroop with Normanton.

== Writings ==
In 2011 he published his autobiography ("Reflections in a Chalice"), and in 2014 and 2017 two volumes on the great Gothic Cathedrals of France ("A Glimpse of Glory"). In 2020 he published a book of his selected sermons, ("Alive in Christ").

== Personal life ==
Lucas is married to Joy and they have three children.

Military offices
Preceded by Brian Halfpenny	Chaplain-in-Chief of the Royal Air Force; 1991– 1995	Succeeded by Robin Turner
