= Giles Legood =

British Anglican priest (born 1967)

Air Vice-Marshal the Venerable Giles Legood MBE KHC
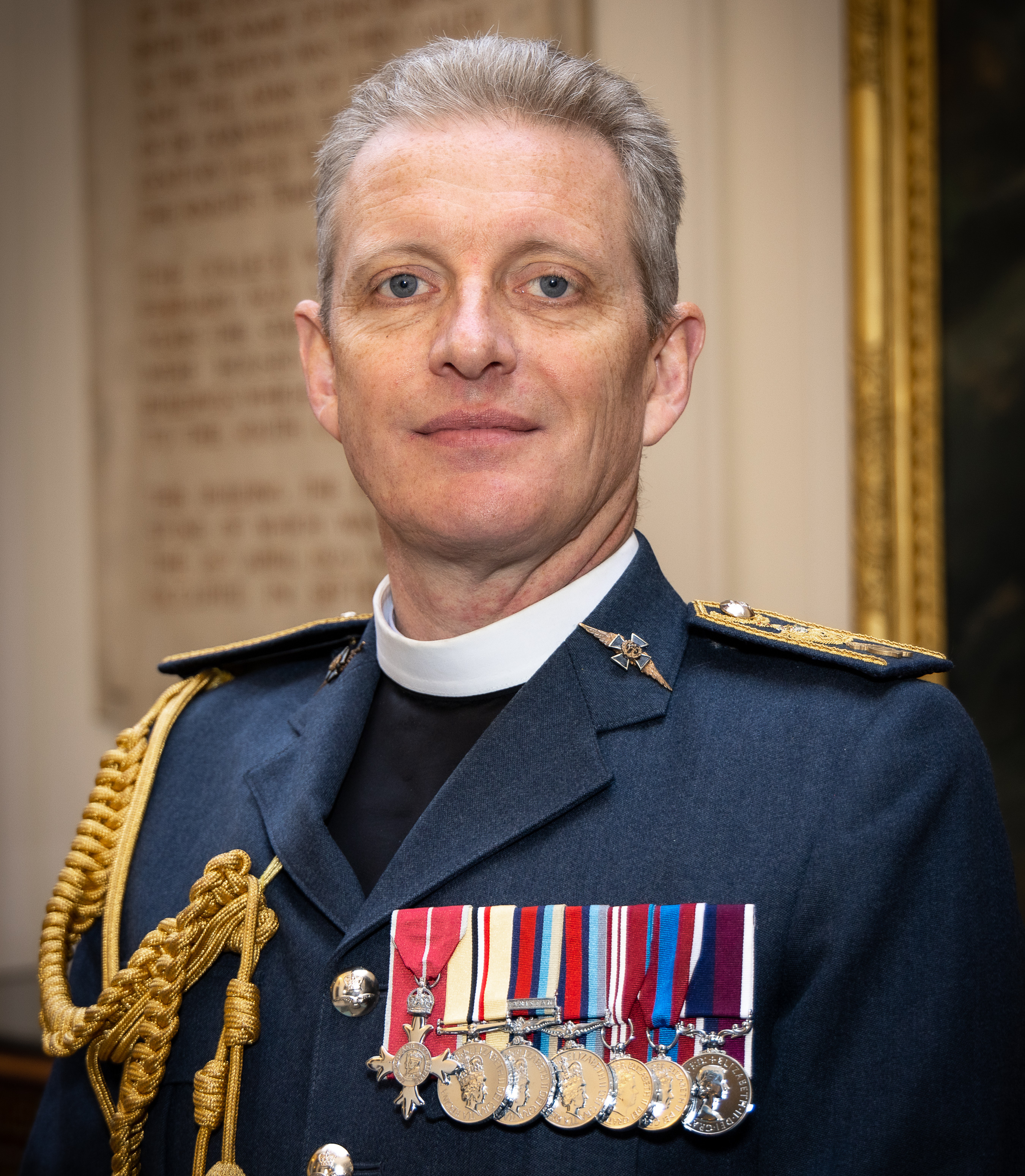
- Legood in 2023
- Born: 1967 (age 58–59); Maidstone, Kent, England
- Education: King's College London
- Military career
- Allegiance: United Kingdom
- Branch: Royal Air Force
- Service years: 2007–present
- Rank: Air Vice-Marshal
- Commands: Royal Air Force Chaplains Branch
- Conflicts: Iraq War; War in Afghanistan
- Awards: Member of the Order of the British Empire

Air Vice-Marshal Giles Leslie Legood, MBE, KHC (born 1967) is a British Anglican priest. Since July 2022 he has served as Chaplain-in-Chief of the Royal Air Force Chaplains Branch and Archdeacon for the Royal Air Force. He previously served as Deputy Chaplain-in-Chief.

== Early life and education ==
Legood was born in Maidstone in Kent and grew up in Bearsted. He was educated at Roseacre Junior School, and later Maidstone Grammar School. He studied at King's College London, graduating in 1988 with a Bachelor of Divinity (BD) degree and the Associate of King's College (AKC) qualification. He then worked in the City of London for two years.

From 1990 to 1992, he trained for ordained ministry at Ripon College Cuddesdon, an Anglican theological college near Oxford. He later undertook postgraduate studies, graduated from Heythrop College London with a Master of Theology (MTh) degree in 1998 and from Derby University with a Doctor of Ministry (DMin) degree in 2004.

== Ordained ministry ==
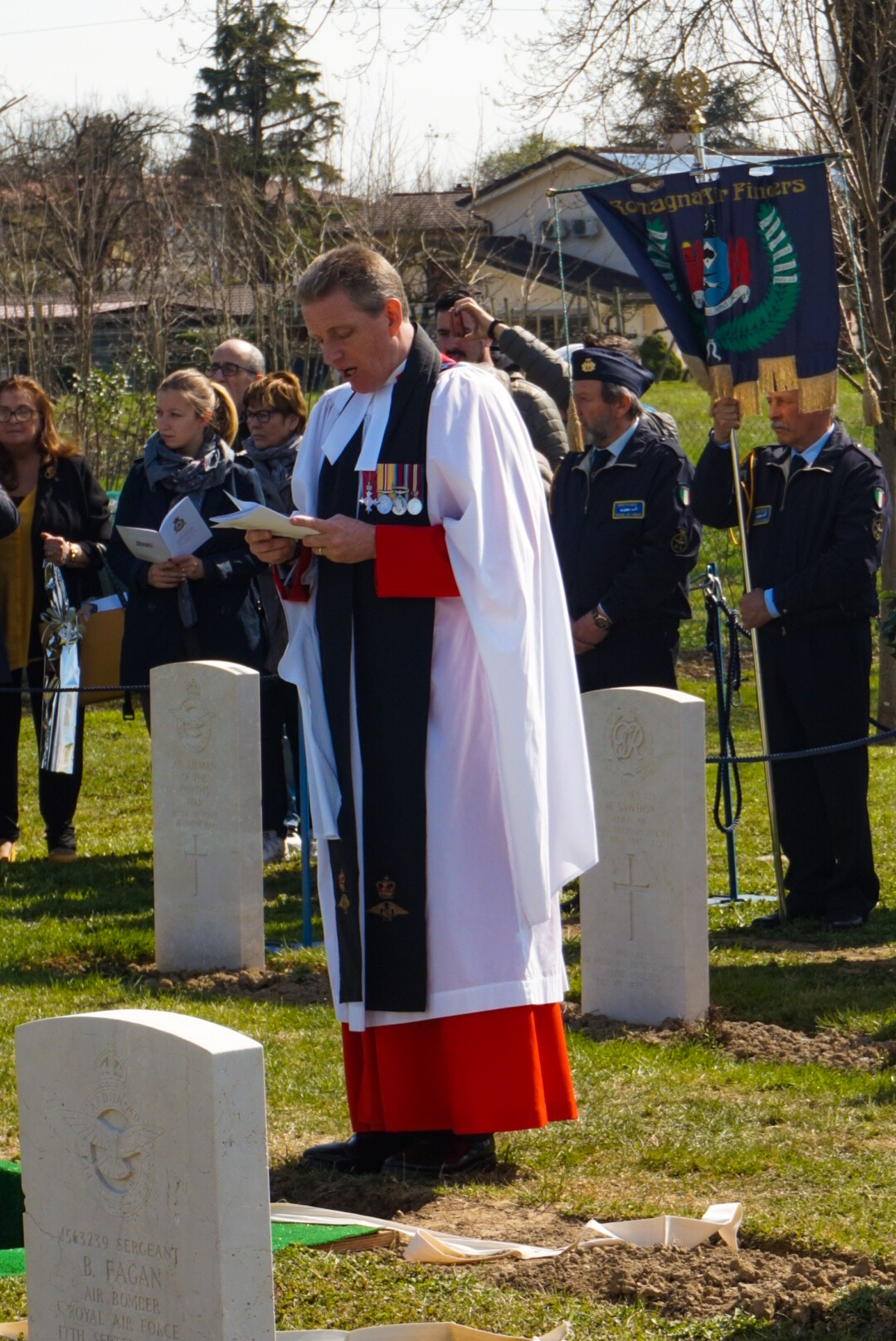
Legood officiating at a funeral, 2019

Legood was ordained in the Church of England as a deacon in 1992 and as a priest in 1993. From 1992 to 1995, he served his curacy at St Mary's Church, North Mymms in the Diocese of St Albans. He was made Chaplain and Honorary Lecturer in the University of London in 1995.

=== Military service ===
On 20 October 2004, Legood was commissioned into the Chaplains Branch, Royal Auxiliary Air Force, as a flight lieutenant. He was attached to No. 600 Squadron RAF, and was the RAF's first part-time chaplain.

In 2007, Legood transferred to the Royal Air Force as a full-time chaplain. He served as chaplain to RAF Northolt, and served in Iraq and Afghanistan. In 2013, he was promoted to the relative rank of wing commander. In 2015 he became senior chaplain at RAF Brize Norton. During his time there, and earlier in service, he joined detachments to the Falkland Islands, Germany, Cyprus, Ascension Island, Kenya and Saudi Arabia.

In 2017, Legood was promoted to Deputy Chaplain-in-Chief (Operations) and was based at Headquarters Air Command.

From 2021 to 2022, Legood attended the Royal College of Defence Studies. On 5 August 2022, on completion of his course, he was appointed Chaplain in Chief (head of the RAF Chaplains Branch) and promoted to the relative rank of air vice-marshal. As the most senior Anglican chaplain, he also additionally serves as Archdeacon for the Royal Air Force, and was collated as archdeacon by Hugh Nelson, Bishop to the Armed Forces, during a service at St Clement Danes on 11 September 2022.

== Honours and decorations ==
In 2014, Legood was appointed a Member of the Order of the British Empire (MBE) in recognition of gallant and distinguished services in Afghanistan during the period 1 April 2013 to 30 September 2013. This made him the first RAF chaplain to receive an operational honour since the Second World War. On 22 July 2018, he was made an Honorary Chaplain to the Queen (QHC). Upon the succession of King Charles III, he became an Honorary Chaplain to the King (KHC). He is also a recipient of the Iraq Medal, the Operational Service Medal for Afghanistan, the Operational Service Medal Iraq and Syria, the Queen Elizabeth II Diamond Jubilee Medal, and Queen Elizabeth II Platinum Jubilee Medal.

Military offices
Preceded by John Ellis	Chaplain-in-Chief of the Royal Air Force; 2022–present	Incumbent
Church of England titles
Preceded by John Ellis	Archdeacon for the Royal Air Force; 2022–present	Incumbent
