= Harry Viener =

The Venerable Harry Viener
- Born: 26 December 1868
- Died: 7 May 1947 (aged 78)
- Military career
- Allegiance: United Kingdom
- Branch: Royal Navy; Royal Air Force
- Service years: 1901–1926
- Rank: Air Commodore
- Units: Royal Navy Chaplaincy Services; Royal Air Force Chaplains Branch
- Conflicts: World War I

Harry Dan Leigh Viener, CBE, UCd'I (26 December 1868 – 7 May 1947) was an eminent Anglican Chaplain in the first half of the 20th century. In 1918, he joined the fledgling Royal Air Force Chaplains Branch as its first Chaplain-in-Chief.

== Early life and education ==
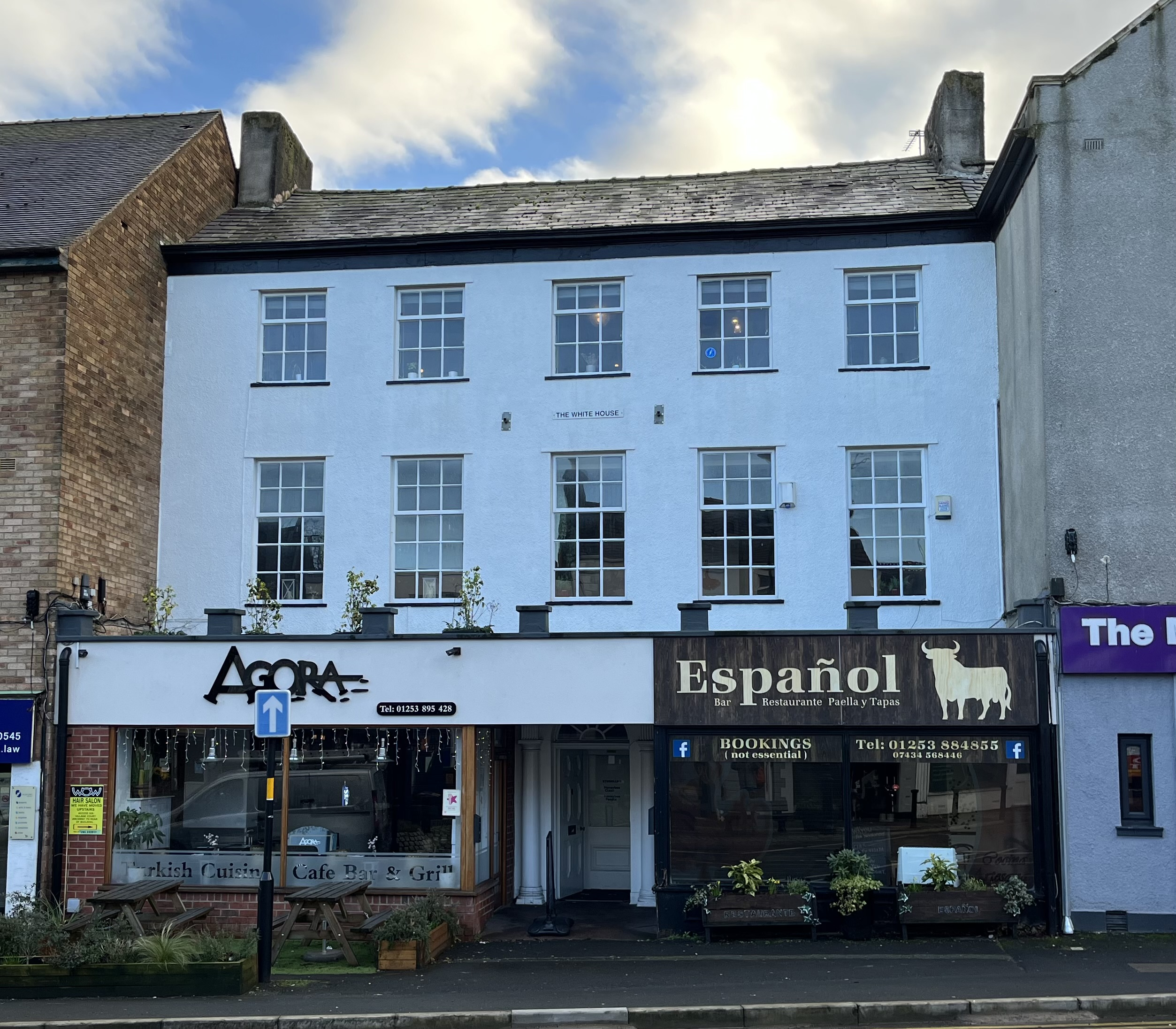
Viener grew up in the White House in Poulton-le-Fylde, Lancashire

Viener was born on 26 December 1868 in Blackpool, England, and initially lived at The White House, the family home, in nearby Poulton-le-Fylde. He was educated at Malvern College, then an all-boys public school in Malvern, Worcestershire. He studied at St John's College, Oxford. In 1890, he was awarded a Casberd exhibition.

On 5 October 1882, he was commissioned into the 1st (Oxford University) Volunteer Battalion, Oxfordshire Light Infantry, as a second lieutenant; nicknamed the Oxford University Volunteers, this battalion was the precursor to the Oxford University Officers' Training Corps. He resigned his commission on 25 March 1893. From 1892 to 1899, he was a schoolmaster and private tutor.

== Ordained ministry ==
Viener was ordained in the Church of England as a deacon in 1899 and as a priest in 1900. He served his curacy at St Peter's Church, Walsall, in the Diocese of Lichfield.

On 12 November 1901, Viener was commissioned as a chaplain of the Royal Navy Chaplaincy Service (RNCS). The RNCS does not give ranks to its chaplain and so while he served with the Royal Navy, Viener simply held the appointment Chaplain.

On 11 October 1918, he joined the fledgling Royal Air Force Chaplains Branch as its Chaplain-in-Chief and was granted the relative rank of brigadier-general. In 1920, he was granted the relative rank of air commodore. He retired from the military on 25 October 1926, and was succeeded as Chaplain-in-Chief by Robert Hanson.

After serving 25 years as a military chaplain, he returned to civilian ministry. From 1927 to 1934, he was Rector of St Nicholas' Church, Chawton, in the Diocese of Winchester. He retired from full-time ministry in 1934.

== Later life ==
Viener died on 7 May 1947.

== Personal life ==
In 1925, Viener married Violet Margaret Keatch.

== Honours ==
Following the 1908 Messina earthquake, Viener was appointed an Officer of the Order of the Crown of Italy "in recognition of valuable services rendered by them at the time of the earthquake in Southern Italy in the year 1908". On 10 October 1919, he was appointed a Commander of the Order of the British Empire (CBE) "in recognition of distinguished services rendered during the War". During his time as Chaplain in Chief, he was appointed an Honorary Chaplain to the King (KHC).

Military offices
| New title | Chaplain-in-Chief of the Royal Air Force; 1918–1926 | Succeeded by Robert Edward Vernon Hanson |
