= Peter Mills (RAF officer) =

British minister

Peter Watson Mills, CB (born 1955) is a British minister of the Church of Scotland and a retired senior Royal Air Force officer. He served as Chaplain-in-Chief of the RAF and head of its Chaplains Branch from 2006 to 2009.

== Early life ==
Mills was born in 1955. He was educated at Arbroath High School, a grammar school in Arbroath, Scotland.

== Career ==
In 1974, Mills joined Aberdeen City Police, which became Grampian Police a year later, as a police constable. He served for 4 years.

In 1978, he began the steps to become a religious minister by starting a Bachelor of Divinity (BD) degree at the University of Aberdeen. He graduated in 1982. In 1983, he studied for a Certificate in Pastoral Studies (CPS). He then served for a year as an assistant minister in Montrose, Angus.

=== Military career ===
Mills was commissioned into the Chaplains Branch, Royal Air Force, on 13 May 1984. He was granted the relative rank of flight lieutenant; RAF chaplains hold only relative ranks as they do not hold executive authority. On 13 May 1985, he was promoted to the relative rank of squadron leader. On 2 September 1987, he transferred from a short service commission to a regular commission. In 1989, he undertook a four-month posting to the Falkland Islands as Force Chaplain. He was promoted to the relative rank of wing commander on 13 May 1998. In 2001, he was appointed Principal Chaplain (Church of Scotland and Free Churches), and promoted to the relative rank of group captain on 31 May of that year. On 27 March 2006, he was promoted to the relative rank of air vice-marshal, and became the 20th Chaplain-in-Chief of the RAF.

== Honours and decorations ==
On 31 May 2001, Mills was appointed Honorary Chaplain to the Queen (QHC). In July 2009, he was awarded an honorary Doctor of Divinity (DD) degree by the University of Aberdeen. In the 2010 New Year Honours, he was appointed Companion of the Order of the Bath (CB).

Military offices
| Preceded by Ron Hesketh | Chaplain-in-Chief of the Royal Air Force; 2006 – 2009 | Succeeded by Ray Pentland |
