= Maurice Edwards =

British Anglican priest

The Venerable Maurice Edwards OBE
- Chaplain-in-Chief, Royal Air Force
- Church: Church of England
- In office: 1940 to 1944
- Predecessor: James Walkey
- Successor: John Jagoe

Orders
- Ordination: 1911

Personal details
- Born: Maurice Henry Edwards; 17 May 1886
- Died: 26 April 1961 (aged 74)
- Denomination: Anglicanism
- Education: Ripon Grammar School; Queens' College, Cambridge

Maurice Henry Edwards, OBE (17 May 1886 – 26 April 1961) was a British Anglican priest. During World War II, from 1940 to 1944, he was Chaplain-in-Chief of the Royal Air Force.

== Early life ==
Edwards was born on 17 May 1886. He was educated at Ripon Grammar School and Queens' College, University of Cambridge. He trained for Holy Orders at Leeds Clergy School, before leaving in 1911 to be ordained in the Church of England.

== Career ==
Edwards was ordained in the Church of England as a deacon in 1911 and as a priest in 1912. He was a curate in Bedale, North Riding, Yorkshire, from 1911 to 1914.

He was appointed a Royal Navy chaplain on 6 August 1914. He then served in the First World War.

In 1918, he joined the fledgling Royal Air Force Chaplaincy Service. He was granted the relative rank of squadron leader on 1 August 1919, the relative rank of wing commander on 6 August 1929, and the relative rank of group captain on 6 August 1934. He saw active service in Iraq from 1919 to 1921, in Egypt from 1921 to 1924 and then in Iraq again from 1930 to 1932.

On 10 April 1940, he was appointed Chaplain-in-Chief, the most senior chaplain of the Royal Air Force, and granted the relative rank of air commodore. In 1941, he convinced C. S. Lewis to undertake tours of RAF bases as a lay lecturer.

From 1944 to 1947, he was based at the Rother Vale Collieries, after which he became rector of Acton Burnell cum Pitchford, a post he held until his retirement in 1953.

He died on 26 April 1961.

== Honours ==
In the 1928 Birthday Honours, Edwards was appointed an Officer of the Order of the British Empire (OBE).

He was appointed an Honorary Chaplain to the King (KHC) on 10 April 1940.

== Notes and references ==
Church of England titles
Preceded by James Rowland Walkey	Chaplain-in-Chief of the RAF; 1940–1944	Succeeded by John Arthur Jagoe
