= Ron Hesketh =

British Anglican priest and military chaplain

Ronald David Hesketh, CB, QHC, FRGS (born 16 June 1947) is a British Anglican priest and retired military chaplain. From 2001 to 2006, he served as Chaplain-in-Chief, and thereby head of the Royal Air Force Chaplains Branch, and Archdeacon for the Royal Air Force.

== Early life and education ==
Hesketh was born in Liverpool on 16 June 1947. He was educated at King David High School, a Jewish Orthodox state school in Liverpool that also accepts students of other faiths. He studied at Bede College, Durham, graduating with a Bachelor of Arts (BA) degree in 1968. In 1969, he matriculated into Ridley Hall, Cambridge, an Evangelical Anglican theological college, to train for ordained ministry; He also studied at St. Michael's College, Llandaff, the Welsh Anglican theological college, from which he graduated with a Diploma in Pastoral Studies (DPS) in 1971. He later studied with the Open University, from which he completed a Diploma in Reformation Studies in 1977.

== Ecclesiastical career ==
Ron Hesketh was ordained in the Church of England as a deacon in 1971 and as a priest in 1972. His first post was a curacy at Holy Trinity Church, Southport in the Diocese of Liverpool. He was then Chaplain to the Mersey branch of the Mission to Seamen. He was a chaplain of the Royal Air Force (RAF) from 1975 to 2006, serving as Chaplain-in-Chief and Archdeacon for the RAF from 2001 to 2006. He was a Canon and Prebendary at Lincoln Cathedral from 2001 to 2006; an Honorary Chaplain to the Queen from 2001 to 2006; and Vocational Officer for the Diocese of Worcester from 2006 to 2011. He has been Co-ordinating Chaplain to the West Mercia Police Force since 2009. In 2018, Ron Hesketh was appointed as the National Chaplain to the Order of St John Fellowship.

== Personal life ==
In 1971, Ron Hesketh married Vera Ruth Taylor. Together they have two children: one son and one daughter.

Military offices
Preceded by Peter Bishop	Chaplain-in-Chief of the Royal Air Force; 2001 – 2006	Succeeded by Peter Mills
Church of England titles
Preceded by Peter Bishop	Archdeacon for the Royal Air Force; 2001 – 2006	Succeeded by Ray Pentland
