= John Ellis (chaplain) =

British Anglican priest and former police officer

The Venerable John Ellis CB QHC
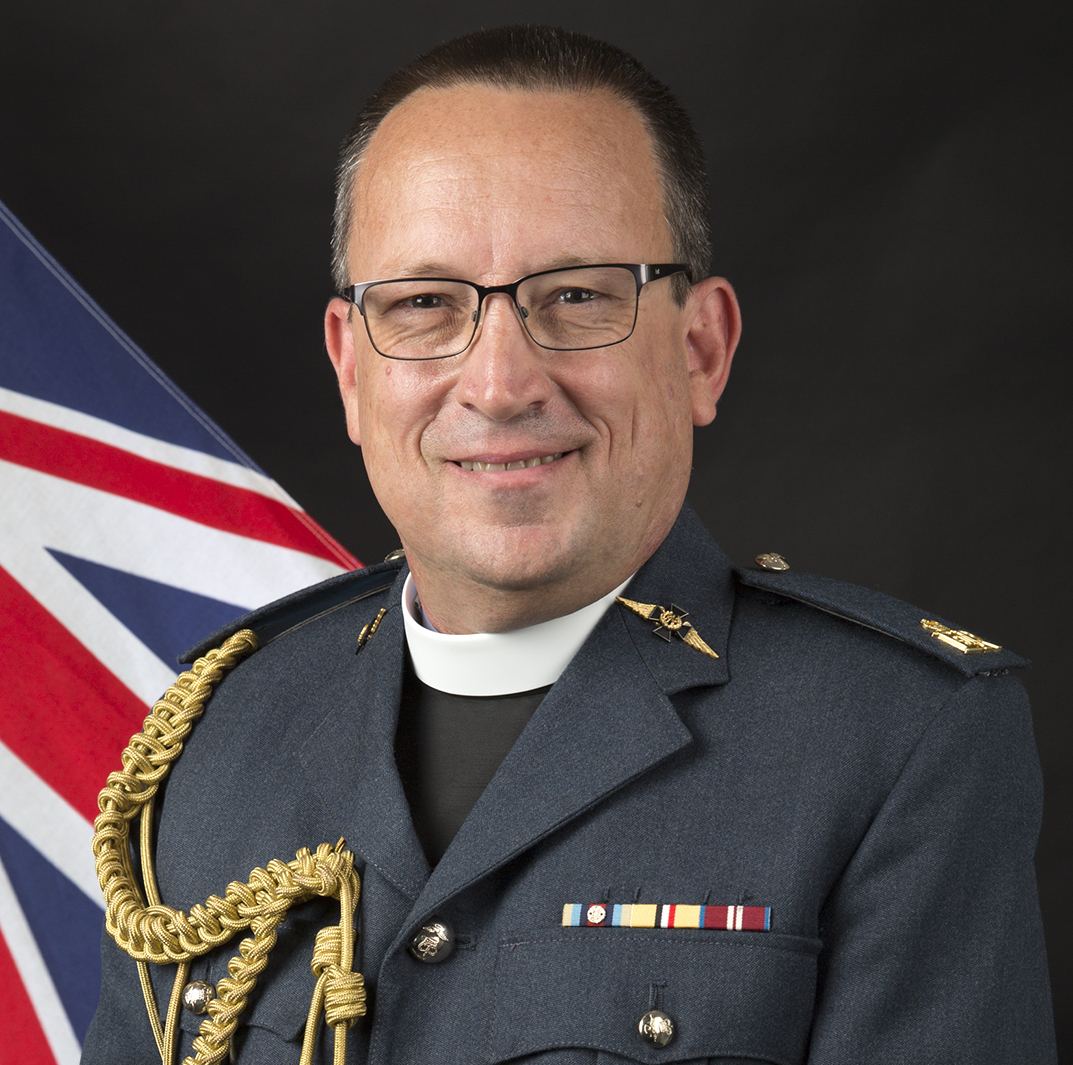
- Ellis in 2018
- Born: 3 November 1963 (age 62); Republic of Malta
- Spouse: Amanda (m. 1985)
- Military career
- Allegiance: United Kingdom
- Branch: Royal Air Force
- Service years: 2004–2022
- Rank: Air Vice-Marshal
- Commands: Royal Air Force Chaplains Branch
- Conflicts: Iraq War; War in Afghanistan
- Awards: Companion of the Order of the Bath

Air Vice-Marshal John Raymond Ellis, CB, QHC (born 3 November 1963) is a British Anglican priest and former police officer. Between July 2018 and July 2022 he served as Chaplain-in-Chief of the Royal Air Force Chaplains Branch and Archdeacon for the Royal Air Force. He had worked as a police officer and then in parish ministry in the Diocese of St Edmundsbury and Ipswich from 1997, before joining the Royal Air Force Chaplains Branch in 2004.

== Early life and education ==
Ellis was born on 3 November 1963 in Malta. He was educated at Hamond's Grammar School in Swaffham, Norfolk, England: the school became a comprehensive school as Hamond's High School while he was there. He worked as a police constable with Suffolk Constabulary from 1983 to 1995.

== Ordained ministry ==
Having trained for Holy Orders at St Stephen's House, Oxford, he was ordained in the Church of England as a deacon in 1997 and as a priest in 1998. From 1997 to 2000, he served his curacy in the multi-church benefice of Clare in the Diocese of St Edmundsbury and Ipswich. Then, from 2000 to 2002, he was priest-in-charge of St John's and St George's, Bury St Edmunds, two Anglo-Catholic churches in the town. In 2002, the churches merged with a neighbouring church to form one benefice, and he became team vicar of All Saints with St John's and St George's, Bury St Edmunds.

=== Military service ===
Following training, he was commissioned into the Royal Air Force Chaplains Branch on 5 August 2004. He then served as chaplain to several RAF stations, and served tours in Iraq and Afghanistan. He was promoted to the relative rank of squadron leader on 5 August 2006, and to the relative rank of wing commander on 1 January 2011. He then served as Joint Force Senior Chaplain in Afghanistan. He was promoted to the relative rank of group captain on 23 March 2015. He then served as Deputy Chaplain-in-Chief (Personnel) and was based at Headquarters Air Command.

From 2017 to 2018, Ellis attended the Royal College of Defence Studies. On 23 July 2018, he was appointed Chaplain in Chief (head of the RAF Chaplains Branch) and promoted to the relative rank of air vice-marshal. As the most senior Anglican chaplain, he also served as Archdeacon for the Royal Air Force. In December 2018, he was made an honorary canon of Lincoln Cathedral. He retired from the RAF in July 2022.

== Personal life ==
In 1985, Ellis married Amanda. Together they have one son and one daughter.

== Honours ==
In 2017, Ellis was made an Honorary Chaplain to the Queen (QHC). In 2019, he was awarded the Royal Air Force Long Service and Good Conduct Medal. He is also a recipient of the Operational Service Medal for Afghanistan, the Iraq Medal, and Queen Elizabeth II Diamond Jubilee Medal. He was appointed a Companion of the Order of the Bath in the 2022 Birthday Honours.

Military offices
Preceded by Jonathan Chaffey	Chaplain-in-Chief of the Royal Air Force; 2018–2022	Succeeded by Giles Legood
Church of England titles
Preceded by Jonathan Chaffey	Archdeacon for the Royal Air Force; 2018–2022	Succeeded by Giles Legood
