= St Mary's Church, Horncastle =

Coordinates: 53.208170°N 0.116998°W

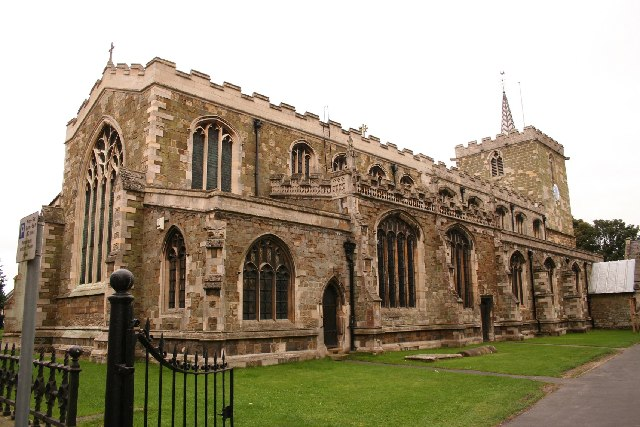
- The church's west facade, facing the market place
- St Mary's Church, Horncastle
- Country: United Kingdom
- Denomination: Church of England
- Website: https://www.stmaryshorncastle.org.uk/

History
- Dedication: St. Mary

Administration
- Province: Canterbury
- Diocese: Lincoln
- Deanery: Horncastle
- Parish: Horncastle

Clergy
- Rector: The Revd Canon Charles Patrick

St. Mary's Church, Horncastle, Lincolnshire, England, dates from the early 13th century and is dedicated to Saint Mary. It serves the Ecclesiastical Parish of Horncastle and a grade II* listed building that was heavily restored by Ewan Christian between 1859 and 1861.

== History ==
It is thought that a Roman church once stood on the site. This appears to have been succeeded by a Saxon Minster, although construction of the present building started c.1250.

The building appears to have experienced two major works of restoration:

- The first, which took place around 1660, once he had been restored as Vicar of Horncastle, and is commemorated on the south wall near to the altar rails by a large metal painted plaque, is credited to The Rev'd Thomas Gibson. Gibson was ill-treated during the Civil War and deprived of his living for some years.
- The 1859–61 restoration is commemorated by a stained glass window in memory of The Rev'd Canon W H Milner, who is credited with being the primary driving force behind the restoration.

Whilst remaining in regular use as the Parish Church of Horncastle, by 2001 a Roman Catholic congregation was also using the building for its Mass on Saturday evenings at 6:00 pm and continues to have Mass there at that time.

== Architecture ==
The building is dominated by three architectural styles:

- Early English as seen in the five-bay nave arcade (the upper sections of which were re-built in 1859–61), internal tower arch with pointed head and western-facing lancet windows, with their moulded string courses.
- Perpendicular as evident in the north and south chancel chapels and nave clerestory, with its five 15th-century windows.
- Victorian restoration seen especially in the east window, chancel arch, nave aisles, porches and vestry office. The floor level at the east end of the church was raised in height by two feet during the 1859-61 restoration, in order to accommodate the central heating system.

There are also some Georgian influences, such as the heavily restored 14th-century piscina in the chancel's south wall.

== Governance ==
Horncastle Parish is part of the South Wolds Group of Churches, which was inaugurated by Bishop John of Lincoln during a service in St Mary's Horncastle on 7 November 2010. This benefice is sub divided into three groups:

- The Asterby Group;
- The Hemingby Group; and
- The Horncastle Group.

== Past clergy of note ==
These include:

- John Langton, later Bishop of Chichester
- Simon Islip, Rector, later Archbishop of Canterbury
- John Rouceby (murdered 1388)
- William Strickland, later Bishop of Carlisle
- Joseph Robertson, Vicar 1779-
- Sidney Clarke, Asst Curate, later Chaplain-in-Chief of the RAF

== Monuments and burials ==
- Sir Ingram Hopton
- Sir Lionel Dymoke
- Jane Dymoke
- Sarah Sellwood, niece of Sir John Franklin and mother of Emily who married Alfred Lord Tennyson
