= Herbert Stuart (priest) =

RAF Chaplain-in-Chief (1924–2019)

The Venerable Canon Herbert James Stuart CB, MA (14 February 1924 – 24 February 2019) was an eminent Anglican priest in the second half of the 20th century.

== Early life ==
He was born on 14 February 1924, educated at Trinity College, Dublin and ordained in 1950. After curacies at Sligo and Rathmines he entered the RAF Chaplaincy Service, eventually becoming an Honorary Chaplain to the Queen and the service's Archdeacon (Chaplain-in-Chief) in 1980. He retired from military service in 1983.

He died on 24 February 2019 at the age of 95.

== Notes and references ==
Church of England titles
Preceded by John Hewitt Wilson	Chaplain-in-Chief of the RAF; 1980–1983	Succeeded by Glyndwr Rhys Renowden
