= Henry Moore (bishop) =

English Anglican bishop (1923–2025)

Henry Wylie Moore (2 November 1923 – 16 December 2025), commonly known as Harry Moore, was an English Anglican bishop. He was the second bishop of the Diocese of Cyprus and the Gulf from 1983 to 1986.

== Life and career ==
Moore was born in 1923. His first job after leaving school was as a clerk with the London, Midland and Scottish Railway. From 1942 to 1946, he served in the armed forces during the Second World War, firstly with the King's Regiment (Liverpool) and later with the Rajputana Rifles. In 1948, he graduated from the University of Liverpool and after studying at Wycliffe Hall, Oxford, was ordained in 1951. His first position was a curacy in Farnworth, Cheshire.

After time as a missionary in Khuzistan, Moore held incumbencies in Burnage and Middleton. He then worked for 16 years with the Church Missionary Society (CMS), firstly as its home secretary and then as executive secretary. He was ordained to the episcopate in 1983 and was Bishop of Cyprus and the Gulf until 1986. He returned to England to again work with the CMS and retired in 1990.

== Personal life and death ==
Moore married Betty Basnett in 1956. They had five children. He turned 100 on 2 November 2023.

Moore died on 16 December 2025 at the age of 102.

Church of England titles
Preceded by Leonard Ashton	Bishop in Cyprus and the Gulf; 1981–1986	Succeeded by John Brown
