= Sidney Clarke (priest) =

The Venerable Sidney Lampard Clarke MA, BSc was an eminent Anglican Chaplain.

He was born on 15 January 1871 in Derby, Derbyshire, England and educated at the Universities of St Andrews and London. He was ordained Deacon in 1899 and Priest a year later. After a curacy at St. Mary's, Horncastle he was a naval chaplain and instructor from 1901 until 1918 when he joined the fledgling RAF Chaplaincy Service. He was at the Halton Camp from 1919 to 1930 when he became Archdeacon (Chaplain-in-Chief) of the service. Upon military retirement he was Vicar of Cranwell from 1934 to 1938.

An Honorary Chaplain to the King he died on 13 November 1945.

== Notes and references ==
Church of England titles
Preceded by Robert Edward Vernon Hanson	Chaplain-in-Chief of the RAF; 1930–1933	Succeeded by James Rowland Walkey
