= The White House, Poulton-le-Fylde =

The White House
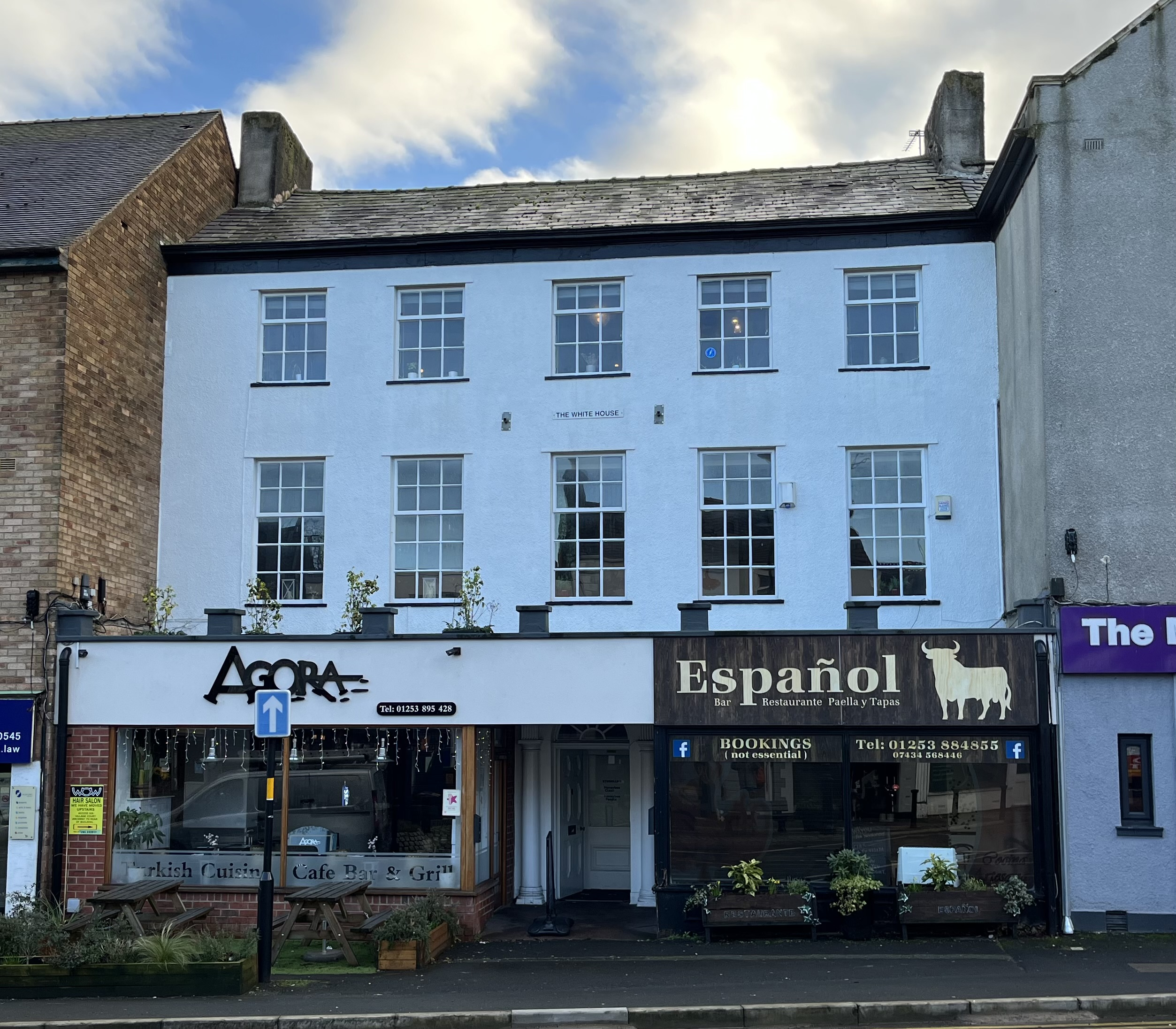
- The property in 2023

- Location within the Borough of Wyre Location within Lancashire Location within England
- 53.84613504°N 2.9917720°W
- Location: 4–10 Queen's Square; Poulton-le-Fylde; England

History
- Built: 18th century

Listed Building – Grade II
- Designated: 16 August 1983
- Reference no.: 1204619

The White House is a historic building in the English market town of Poulton-le-Fylde, Lancashire. It has been designated a Grade II listed building by Historic England. The property is located in Queen's Square, around 250 feet (76 m) to the southeast of the town centre and Market Place.

A town house, with the ground floor now occupied by businesses, it was built in the mid-18th century, constructed of rendered brick with a cornice gutter and a slate roof. It is on a double-pile plan with three storeys. It has five bays and the first-floor casement windows are tall with glazing bars; the second-floor windows are smaller. The front entrance to the building is flanked by Doric pilasters.

The White House was an early home of chaplain Harry Viener.

== See also ==
- Listed buildings in Poulton-le-Fylde

== Sources ==
- Historic England, "4, 6 and 10, Queen Square (1204619)", National Heritage List for England
