= James Walkey =

The Venerable James Rowland Walkey CBE, was an amateur sportsman in the first half of the twentieth century who later became an eminent Anglican Chaplain.

He was born into a military family on 10 April 1880 and educated at Plymouth College and Christ's College, Cambridge. During his varsity years he was awarded a Blue for Rugby and, after joining the British Army as a chaplain, was its 100-yard champion in 1906. In that year he married Bijou Frances Paske daughter of the Colonel Commandant of the Notts and Derbyshire Regiment with whom he had one son and six daughters. He was mentioned in despatches during World War I and at its conclusion joined the fledgling Royal Air Force Chaplaincy Service. After serving at Uxbridge (during which time he became its Fencing champion) he held posts in Iraq and the Middle East before becoming an Honorary Chaplain to the King and eventually its Archdeacon (Chaplain-in-Chief). Later he held incumbencies at Wateringbury, Worting, Angmering, Haversham and Moreton. He retired just a year before his death on 8 January 1960.

== Notes and references ==
Church of England titles
Preceded by Sidney Lampard Clarke	Chaplain-in-Chief of the RAF; 1933–1940	Succeeded by Maurice Henry Edwards
