= Glyndwr Renowden =

British military chaplain (1929–2002)

The Venerable Glyndwr Rhys Renowden CB (13 August 1929 – 17 August 2002) was an eminent Anglican priest in the second half of the 20th century.

== Biography ==
He was born into an ecclesiastical family (Note: His father was the Revd Charles Renowden, sometime Vicar of Dafen, Carmarthenshire and his brother the Very Revd Raymond Renowden, Dean of St Asaph) on 13 August 1929. He was educated at Llanelli Grammar School and St David's College, Lampeter.

Renowden was ordained in 1953. He served curacies at St Mary's, Tenby and St Mary's, Chepstow. He then entered the Chaplains Branch of the Royal Air Force (RAF), in which he served for 30 years. He was appointed Resident Chaplain of St Clement Danes, in London, the central church of the Royal Air Force (1976). Eventually becoming an Honorary Chaplain to the Queen (1980) and the service's Chaplain-in-Chief (1983). He was appointed Companion of the Order of the Bath (CB) in the 1987 Queen's Birthday Honours.

He retired from military service in 1988 and stepped down as Honorary Chaplain to the Queen. He then became Priest in charge at Llanfallteg with Clunderwen and Castell Dwyran.

He died on 17 August 2002.

== Notes ==
Church of England titles
Preceded by Herbert James Stuart	Chaplain-in-Chief of the RAF; 1983–1988	Succeeded by Brian Halfpenny
