= John Layfield (theologian) =

John Layfield (also spelled Laifield) (died 6 November 1617) was an English scholar and Bible translator.

== Life ==
Layfield was educated at Merchant Taylors' School, Northwood before proceeding to Trinity College, Cambridge, where he was a Fellow from 1585 to 1603. He was chaplain to George Clifford, the 3rd Earl of Cumberland on his 1598 voyage to Puerto Rico. Rector of St Clement Danes in London from 1602 until his death in 1617, he was appointed a founding fellow of Chelsea College by King James I of England in 1610. He was also a member of the "First Westminster Company" charged by James with the translation of the first 12 books of the King James Version of the Bible. It was said that "being skilled in architecture, his judgment was much relied on for the fabric of the tabernacle and temple." He died in London, on 6 November 1617.

== Sources ==
- McClure, Alexander. (1858) The Translators Revived: A Biographical Memoir of the Authors of the English Version of the Holy Bible. Mobile, Alabama: R. E. Publications (republished by the Maranatha Bible Society, 1984 ASIN B0006YJPI8 )
- Nicolson, Adam. (2003) God's Secretaries: The Making of the King James Bible. New York: HarperCollins ISBN 0-06-095975-4
- Fuller, Thomas. (1842) The Church History of Britain, from the Birth of Jesus Christ Until the Year MDCXLVIII. London: Thomas Tegg.
