= William Harward =

William Harward DD (d. 1589) was a Canon of Windsor from 1562 - 1589.

== Family ==
He married (as her third husband) Alice Cavell, widow of Humphrey Cavell MP, in 1568.

== Career ==
He was educated at St John's College, Cambridge, where he graduated BA in 1550, and then Queens' College, Cambridge, where he graduated MA in 1553 and was a fellow until 1559.

He was appointed:

- Prebendary of Bursalis in Chichester 1558 - 1560
- Rector of St Clement Danes 1559 - 1589
- Vicar of Cowfold, Sussex 1560
- Rector of Shadoxhurst, Kent
- Rector of Farnham Royal, Buckinghamshire
- Prebendary of Winchester 1581

He was appointed to the twelfth stall in St George's Chapel, Windsor Castle in 1562, and held the stall until 1589.
