= Robert Hanson (priest) =

The Venerable Robert Edward Vernon Hanson, OBE, MA (29 March 1866 – 7 February 1947), was an eminent Anglican Chaplain in the first half of the 20th century.

Hanson was born on 29 March 1866 and educated at King's College London and Emmanuel College, Cambridge. He was ordained in 1895 and after a curacy at St John's, Richmond, joined the Army Chaplains' Department as Chaplain to the Forces (4th class, ranking as captain) on 10 December 1900. He was a Chaplain to the British Armed Forces and instructor until 1918. He served in the South African War and in Aldershot, Egypt, Dublin, Deepcut, Malta and the Great War where he was mentioned in dispatches. He joined the fledgling RAF Chaplaincy Service as Assistant Chief Chaplain and became its Archdeacon (Chaplain-in-Chief) in 1926. An Honorary Chaplain to the King he retired in 1930 and died on 7 February 1947.

== Notes and references ==
Church of England titles
Preceded by Harry Dan Leigh Viener	Chaplain-in-Chief of the RAF; 1926–1930	Succeeded by Sidney Lampard Clarke
