= Honourable Company of Air Pilots =

Livery company of the City of London

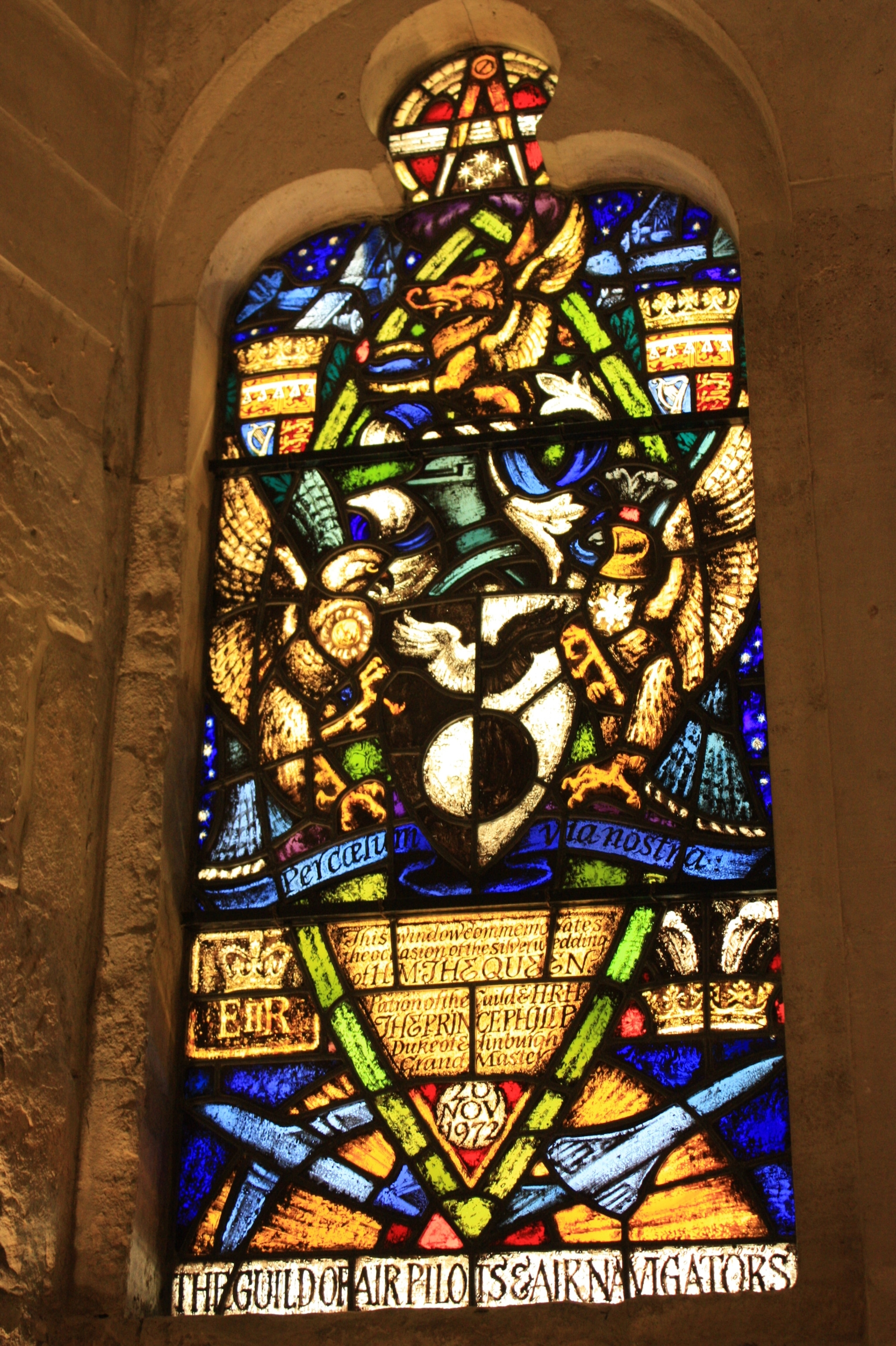
Stained glass to the Guild of Air Pilots and Air Navigators, Guildhall, London

The Honourable Company of Air Pilots, formerly the Guild of Air Pilots and Air Navigators (GAPAN), is one of the Livery Companies of the City of London. The company was founded in 1929, and became a Livery Company in 1956. Elizabeth II granted Honourable status to the company in February 2014. Prince Philip, Duke of Edinburgh, formally presented the royal charter to the master of the company, Tudor Owen, at a banquet held at the London Guildhall on 19 February 2014.

The company ranks eighty-first in the order of precedence of livery companies and fourth in the order of precedence of the modern livery companies. It is unique amongst City Livery Companies in having active regional committees in Australia, Hong Kong, New Zealand and North America.

The company's motto is 'Per Cælum Via Nostra', 'Our Way Is By The Heavens'.

== Objectives of the Company ==
The objectives of the company are:

- To establish and maintain the highest standards of air safety through the promotion of good airmanship among pilots and navigators.
- To maintain a liaison with all authorities connected with licensing, training and legislation affecting pilot or navigator whether private, professional, civil or military.
- To constitute a body of experienced airmen available for advice and consultation and to facilitate the exchange of information.
- To strive to enhance the status of air pilots and air navigators.
- To assist air pilots and air navigators in need through the Benevolent Fund.

== The Court of the Company ==
Note: This information may not be up to date.

Year
2026-2027
Master
Elizabeth Walkinshaw
Immediate Past Master
John Denyer
Master-Elect
Steve Dean
Wardens

Dave Singleton

- Steve Durrell
- Pete Taylor
Clerk
Paul Tacon
Chaplains
Ray J. Pentland CB
