= Jonathan Chaffey =

British Church of England priest

The Venerable Jonathan Chaffey CB
- Archdeacon of Oxford
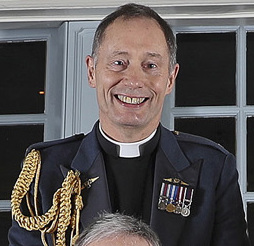
- Chaffey in 2017
- Church: Church of England
- Diocese: Oxford
- In office: 2020 to present
- Predecessor: Martin Gorick
- Previous posts: Chaplain-in-Chief, RAF (2014–2018)

Personal details
- Born: Jonathan Paul Michael Chaffey; 1962 (age 63–64)
- Denomination: Anglicanism
- Military career
- Allegiance: United Kingdom
- Branch: Royal Air Force
- Service years: 1990–2018
- Rank: Air Vice-Marshal
- Commands: Royal Air Force Chaplains Branch
- Conflicts: War in Afghanistan
- Awards: Companion of the Order of the Bath

Jonathan Paul Michael Chaffey CB (born 1962) is a British Church of England priest and former military chaplain, who served with the Royal Air Force. He serves as Archdeacon of Oxford in the same diocese; from 2014 to 2018 he served as the Chaplain-in-Chief and head of the Royal Air Force Chaplains Branch. He previously served as Deputy Chaplain-in-Chief.

== Early life ==
Chaffey was born in 1962 in London, England. He was educated at Worksop College, a private school in Worksop, Nottinghamshire. He studied at St Chad's College, Durham, graduating with a Bachelor of Arts (BA) degree in 1983. In 1984, he entered Cranmer Hall, Durham, an Anglican theological college attached to St John's College, Durham, to train for ordained ministry.

== Ordained ministry ==
Chaffey was ordained in the Church of England as a deacon in 1987 and as a priest in 1988. Before joining the military, he served his curacy at St Stephen's Church, Gateacre in the Diocese of Liverpool.

=== Military career ===
On 20 May 1990, Chaffey was commissioned into the Chaplains Branch, Royal Air Force and granted the relative rank of flight lieutenant. His first posting was to RAF Lyneham. On 20 May 1991, he was promoted to the relative rank of squadron leader. He transferred from a short service commission to a permanent commission on 17 November 1993. During his early career he served as a chaplain at RAF Stafford, RAF Finningley, RAF Wittering, RAF Waddington and RAF Lossiemouth. He also completed overseas deployments to RAF Gibraltar, the Falkland Islands, Al Udeid Air Base in Qatar and Gioia del Colle Air Base in Italy.

On 1 July 2003, as part of the half-yearly promotions, Chaffey was promoted to the relative rank of wing commander. From 2004 to 2007, he served as the Staff Chaplain at Royal Air Force College Cranwell. In addition to being the senior chaplain, he also taught the Beliefs and Values Programme and the Care in Leadership Course. He was then posted to HQ Chaplaincy Services in a training role. During this time he also completed two postings to Afghanistan as part of Operation Herrick. On 1 January 2010, he was granted the relative rank of group captain. He was then appointed the Deputy Chaplain-in-Chief.

In 2013, Chaffey began his attendance of the Royal College of Defence Studies. In July 2014, he succeeded Ray Pentland as the Chaplain-in-Chief and head of the Royal Air Force Chaplains Branch. He was promoted to the relative rank of air vice-marshal on 25 July 2014. Chaffey was appointed a Companion of the Order of the Bath in the 2018 New Year Honours. He retired from the Royal Air Force in July 2018.

=== Later ministry ===
On 29 January 2020, it was announced that Chaffey would be the next Archdeacon of Oxford in the Diocese of Oxford: he was due to be licensed as archdeacon during a service at Christ Church Cathedral, Oxford on 9 May 2020. But, due to the COVID-19 pandemic, was instead collated online on 1 May 2020. He has been a residentiary canon of Christ Church Cathedral, Oxford since 2020. He served as Interim Sub Dean of the cathedral from November 2022 to October 2023, when Revd Canon Peter Moger was installed as the new sub-dean.

== Personal life ==
Chaffey is married to Jane, who is also a priest. Together, they have three daughters.

Military offices
Preceded by Ray Pentland	Chaplain-in-Chief of the Royal Air Force; Archdeacon for the Royal Air Force; 2014–2018	Succeeded by John Ellis
