= Hewitt Wilson =

The Venerable (John) Hewitt Wilson CB, MA (14 February 1924 – 29 June 2008) was an eminent Anglican priest in the second half of the 20th century.

He was born on 14 February 1924 and educated at Kilkenny College and Trinity College, Dublin. After a curacy at St. George's Church, Dublin he entered the RAF Chaplaincy Service, serving in a variety of locations before eventually becoming its Archdeacon (Chaplain-in-Chief). serving for seven years.

He was Archdeacon Emeritus from 1980 and Rector of The Heyfords with Rousham and Somerton until 1993. He died on 29 June 2008.

Church of England titles
Preceded by Leonard James Ashton	Chaplain-in-Chief of the RAF; 1973–1980	Succeeded by Herbert James Stuart
