= Ray Pentland =

British Church of England priest

The Venerable Ray Pentland CB QHC
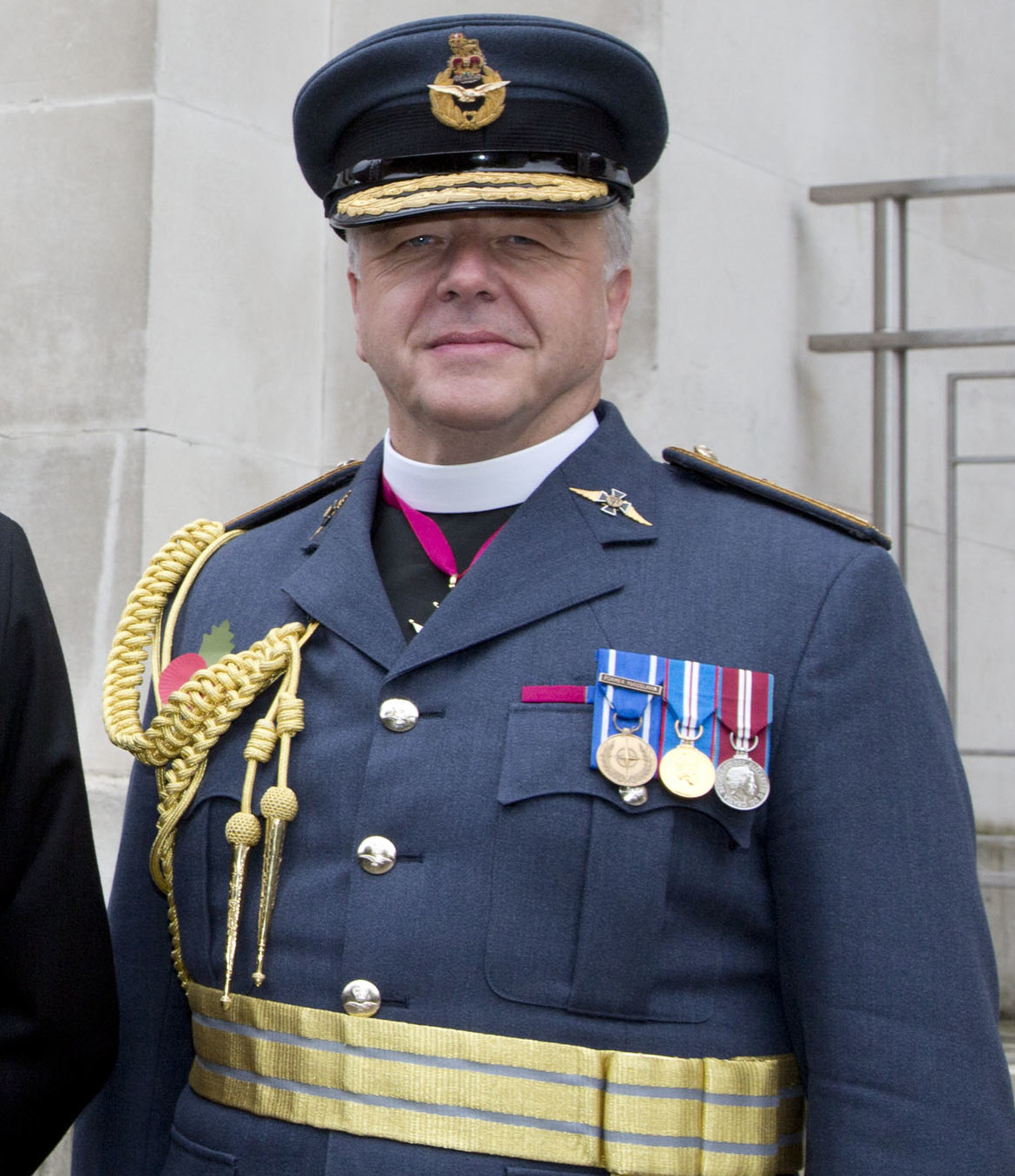
- Pentland in 2013
- Born: 14 July 1957 (age 69); Greenock, Scotland
- Military career
- Allegiance: United Kingdom
- Branch: Royal Air Force (1990–2014); Royal Auxiliary Air Force (2014–present)
- Service years: 1990–present
- Rank: Air Vice Marshal
- Service number: 5207651M
- Commands: Chaplains Branch
- Awards: Companion of the Order of the Bath

Raymond Jackson Pentland, CB, QHC (born 14 July 1957) is a British Church of England priest. He is a retired military chaplain, having served as Chaplain-in-Chief of the Royal Air Force and head of its Chaplains Branch from 2009 to 2014.

== Early life ==
Pentland was born on 14 July 1957 in Greenock, Scotland, to Adam Jackson Pentland and Edith Henderson Pentland. He was educated at Cowdenknowes High School.

== Career ==
=== Civilian ministry ===
Pentland attended the William Booth Memorial Training College from 1977. Upon graduation in 1979, he became an Officer of The Salvation Army. He served in number of inner city locations throughout the United Kingdom from 1979 to 1986.

In 1986, Pentland left The Salvation Army to enter St John's College, Nottingham and train for ordination into the Church of England. He was ordained a deacon in 1988, in Southwell Minster, Nottinghamshire. He then became Assistant Curate of St. Jude's Church, Mapperley, Nottingham. He was ordained a priest in 1989.

=== Military career ===
In 1990, Pentland attended the Specialist Entrant and Re-entrant Course at RAF Cranwell. On 26 August 1990, he was commissioned into the Chaplains Branch of the Royal Air Force as a chaplain with the relative rank of flight lieutenant. He was given the service number 5207651M. On 26 August 1991, he was promoted to the relative rank of squadron leader. He transferred from a short service commission to a permanent commission on 1 November 1993. As part of the half-yearly promotions, he was promoted to the relative rank of wing commander on 1 January 2003.

Pentland was member of the House of Clergy in the General Synod of the Church of England from 2005 to 2014. On 27 March 2006, he was appointed Principal Anglican Chaplain, Archdeacon for the Royal Air Force and Honorary Chaplain to the Queen (QHC). He was also made an Honorary Canon of Lincoln Cathedral. On 1 April 2009, he was selected to succeed Peter Mills as Chaplain-in-Chief of the Royal Air Force: he took up the appointment on 1 October in addition to his role as Archdeacon, becoming the 21st Chaplain in Chief. In the 2013 New Year Honours, he was appointed Companion of the Order of the Bath (CB).

Pentland retired in 2014, and was succeeded as Chaplain-in-Chief by Jonathan Chaffey.

== Later life ==
Having retired from full-time ministry when he retired from the Royal Air Force in 2014, Pentland held permission to officiate in the Dioceses of Oxford and of London from 2014 to 2019. He continues his link with the military, having transferred his commission from the RAF to the Royal Auxiliary Air Force (RAuxAF) on 24 November 2014 in the rank of air commodore, and later as acting air vice-marshal. From 2015 to 2018, he also served as an honorary assistant curate at St Andrew-by-the-Wardrobe and St James Garlickhythe. From 2019 to 2021, he was a non-stipendiary minister at Holy Trinity Church, Aylesbury in the Diocese of Oxford. He has held permission to officiate in the Diocese of Lichfield since 2021, and in the Diocese of London since 2024.

== Personal life ==
In 1979, Pentland married Christine Ann Lyth. They have two children.

Church of England titles
| Preceded by Ron Hesketh | Archdeacon for the Royal Air Force; 2006–2014 | Succeeded by Jonathan Chaffey |
Military offices
| Preceded by Peter Mills | Chaplain-in-Chief of the Royal Air Force; 2009–2014 | Succeeded by Jonathan Chaffey |
