= Military archdeacon =

Senior chaplains in the UK armed forces

The most senior Anglican chaplain in each branch of the British Armed Forces (Royal Navy, British Army, and Royal Air Force) is made an archdeacon in the Church of England. Respectively they are titled the Archdeacon for the Royal Navy, the Archdeacon for the Army, and the Archdeacon for the Royal Air Force. As an archdeacon, they are styled The Venerable.

== Archdeacon for the Royal Navy ==
The Archdeacon for the Royal Navy is the senior Anglican chaplain of the Royal Navy Chaplaincy Service. Since 2021, this has been Andrew Hillier.

Until 1998, the most senior Anglican chaplain had also been head of the Chaplaincy Service as the Chaplain of the Fleet. Since then, chaplains from other denominations have also been able to be appointed Chaplain of the Fleet but when an Anglican becomes head they hold both appointments concurrently.

- Simon Golding (1998–2002); also Chaplain of the Fleet from 2000 to 2002
- Barry Hammett (2002–2006); also Chaplain of the Fleet from 2002 to 2006
- John Green (2006–2010); also Chaplain of the Fleet from 2006 to 2010
- Martin Poll (2010–2012)
- Ian Wheatley (2012–2017); also Chaplain of the Fleet from 2014
- Martyn Gough (2018–2021); also Chaplain of the Fleet
- Andrew Hillier (2021–present); also Chaplain of the Fleet

== Archdeacon for the Army ==
The Archdeacon for the Army is the senior Anglican chaplain of the Royal Army Chaplains' Department (RAChD), British Army. Since 2022, this has been Stephen Dunwoody.

Until 1987, the most senior Anglican chaplain had also been head of the RAChD as its Chaplain General. Since then, chaplains from other denominations have also been able to be appointed Chaplain General but when an Anglican becomes head they hold both appointments concurrently.

- Tom Robinson (1987–1990)
- Graham Roblin (1990–1993)
- Alan Dea (1993–1995)
- John Holliman (1996–1999)
- John Blackburn (1999–2004); also Chaplain General from 2000 to 2004
- Stephen Robbins (2004–2011); also Chaplain General from 2008 to 2011
- Peter Eagles (2011–2017), Deputy Chaplain General
- Clinton Langston (2017–2022); also Chaplain General from 2018 to 2022
- Stephen Dunwoody (2022–present)

== Archdeacon for the Royal Air Force ==
The Archdeacon for the Royal Air Force is the most senior Anglican chaplain of the Royal Air Force Chaplains Branch. They also hold the position of Principal Anglican Chaplain. Since 2022, this has been Giles Legood.

Until 2001, the most senior Anglican chaplain had also been head of the Chaplains Branch as its Chaplain-in-Chief. Since then, chaplains from other denominations have also been able to be appointed Chaplain-in-Chief but when an Anglican becomes head they hold all three appointments concurrently.

- Ron Hesketh (2001–2006); also Chaplain-in-Chief from 2001 to 2006
- Ray Pentland (2006–2014); also Chaplain-in-Chief from 2009 to 2014
- Jonathan Chaffey (2014–2018); also Chaplain-in-Chief from 2014 to 2018
- John Ellis (2018–2022); also Chaplain-in-Chief from 2018 to 2022
- Giles Legood (2022–present); also Chaplain-in-Chief since 2022
