= Chaplain to the King =

Member of the clergy within the United Kingdom

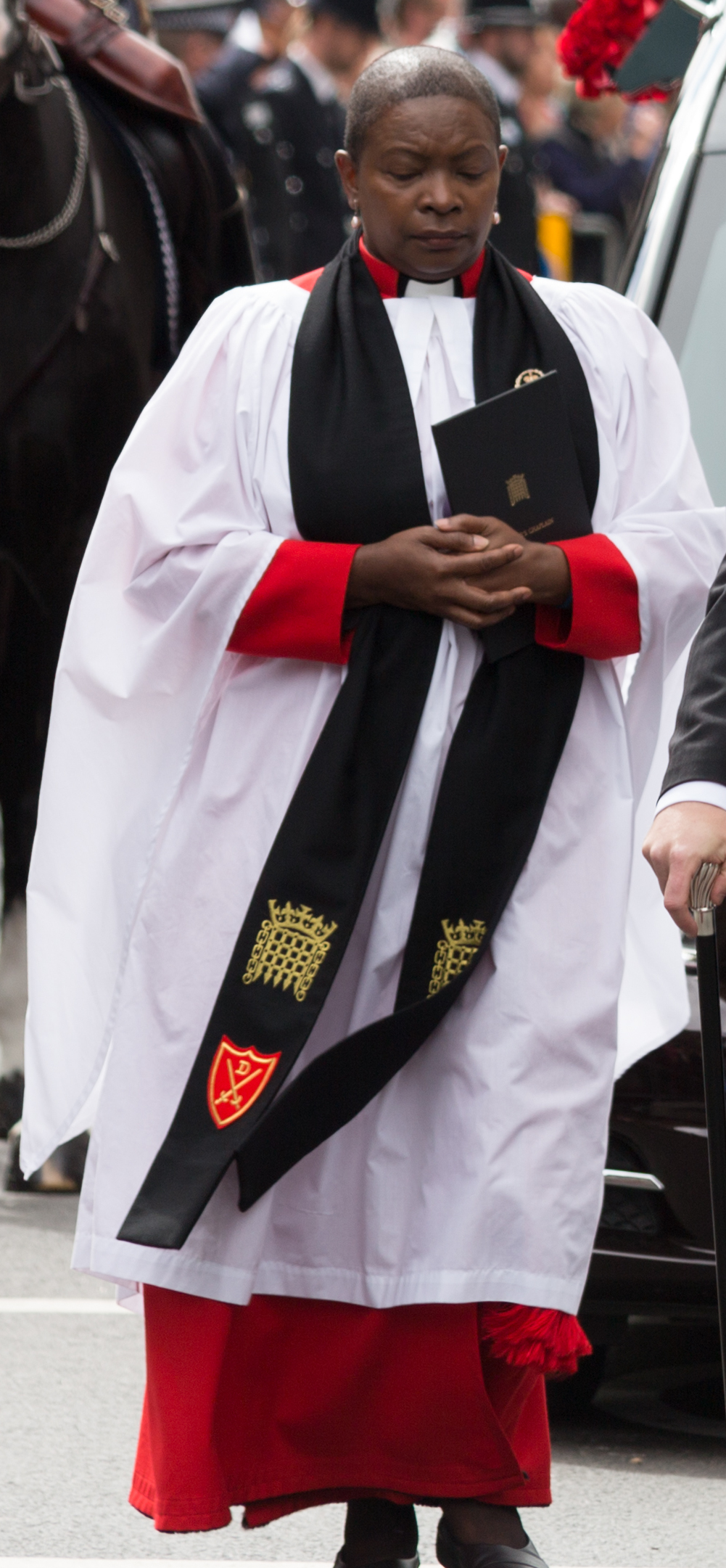
The Revd Canon Rose Hudson-Wilkin, a Chaplain to HM The Queen, in 2017.

Chaplain to the King is an appointment in the Royal Household of the United Kingdom held by a number of clergy of the Church of England and the Church of Scotland. When the reigning monarch is female, they are referred to as a Chaplain to the Queen.

Distinct from the above is the appointment of Honorary Chaplain to the King (KHC), which is a distinction awarded to military chaplains, akin to being an aide-de-camp to the King.

== The College of Chaplains in England ==
An establishment of thirty-six Chaplains is maintained, forming part of the Ecclesiastical Household. At one time the Chaplains were expected to be in permanent attendance (on rotation) at the royal court, but today their duties are minimal (with each Chaplain being invited to preach once a year at the Chapel Royal, St James's Palace). The Chaplains are overseen by the Clerk of the Closet, who is usually a diocesan bishop. Any Chaplain appointed to be a Dean or a Bishop is required then to relinquish the office of Chaplain.

In 1964 a mandatory retirement age of 70 was introduced. Retired Chaplains are sometimes appointed as Extra Chaplains, as a mark of special recognition.

== Chaplains to the King in Scotland ==
A contingent of ten Chaplains forms part of the Royal Household in Scotland. They are overseen by the Dean of the Chapel Royal in Scotland. As in England, some may be appointed as Extra Chaplains after retirement.

== Honorary Chaplains to the King ==
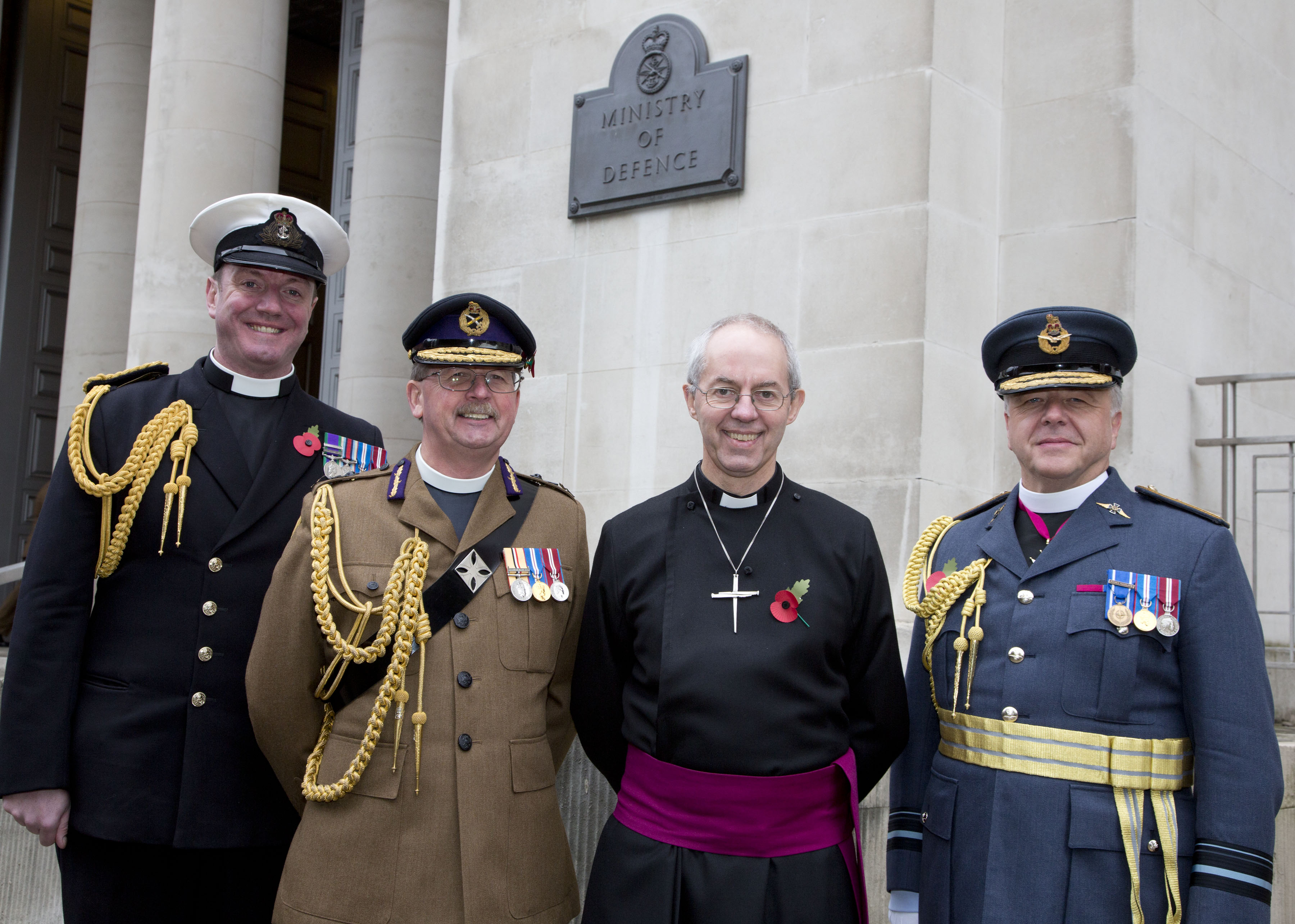
Three Honorary Chaplains to the Queen (Scott Brown, Jonathan Woodhouse and Ray Pentland) with the Archbishop of Canterbury in 2015.

Honorary Chaplain to the King, or King's Honorary Chaplain (KHC), is an appointment in the armed forces of the United Kingdom and other Commonwealth realms, held by senior military chaplains. There are normally twelve in all (four from each service). When the reigning monarch is female, they are known as Queen's Honorary Chaplains (QHC). When in uniform, Honorary Chaplains to the King are entitled to wear aiguillettes.

The Honorary Chaplains are distinct from, and appointed in addition to, the Chaplains to the King who are part of the Ecclesiastical Household.

The regular practice of appointing a select number of Naval, Military and Air Force chaplains to be Honorary Chaplains to the King dates from the mid-1920s. The appointments were made, with the King's approval, by the Admiralty, the War Office and the Air Ministry respectively.

== Dress and accoutrements ==
Chaplains and Honorary Chaplains alike may wear a scarlet cassock and a silver-gilt badge (consisting of the royal cypher and crown within an oval wreath). The distinctive cassock and badge were introduced during the reign of King Edward VII. The badge is worn below any medal ribbons or medals during the conduct of religious services, on the left side of the scarf by chaplains who wear the scarf and on academic or ordinary clerical dress by other chaplains. Chaplains to the Sovereign may continue to wear the scarlet cassock after retiring; Honorary Chaplains used to do likewise, but since the 1980s this particular privilege has been restricted to those who previously served as Chaplain to the Fleet, Chaplain-General to the Forces or Chaplain in Chief of the RAF).

== See also ==
- Ecclesiastical Household
