= St Peter's Church, Bournemouth =

Church in Dorset, England

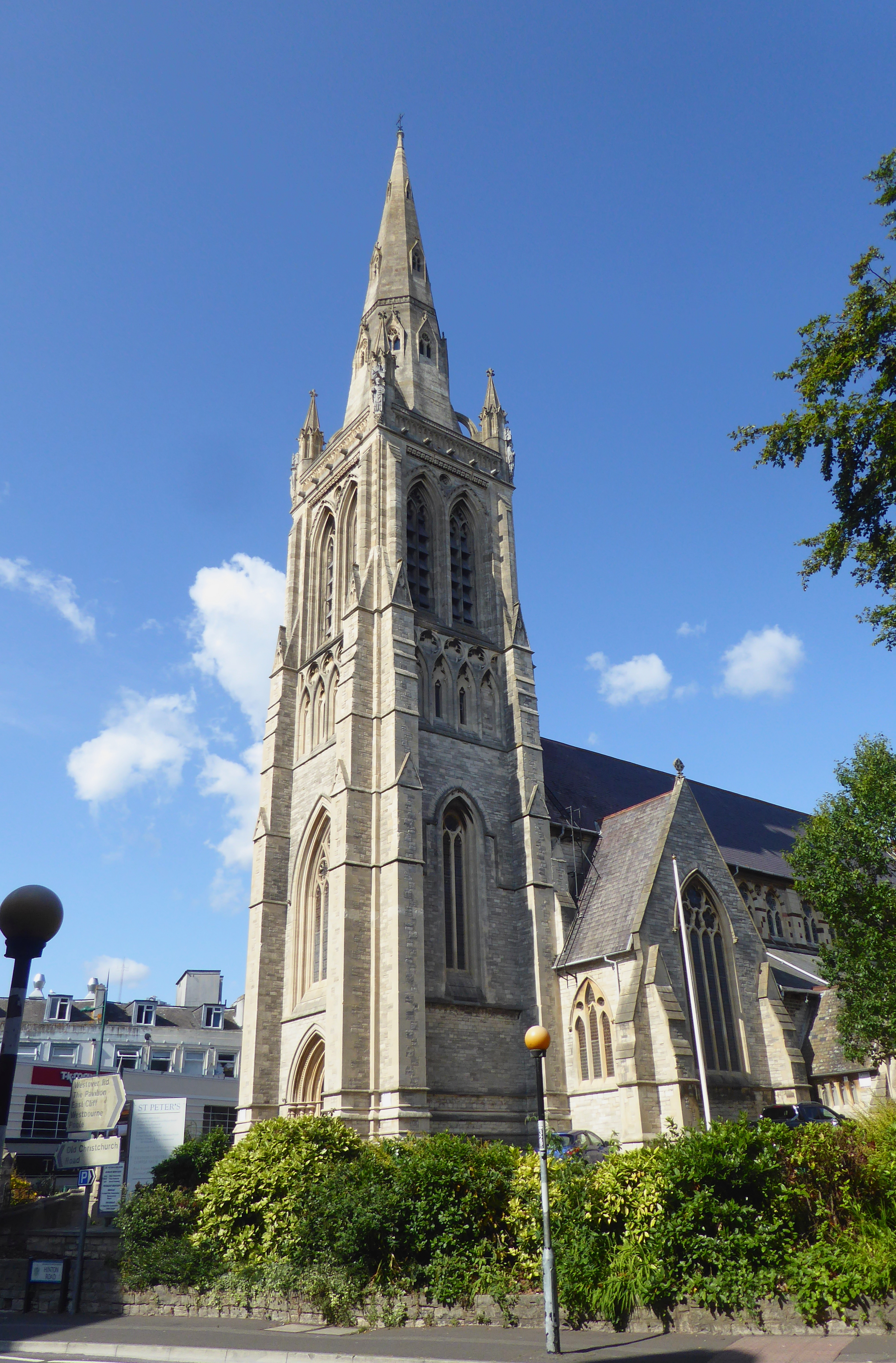
- St Peter's Church, Bournemouth
- 50.7205°N 1.8755°W
- Denomination: Church of England
- Churchmanship: Liberal Catholic
- Website: stpetersbournemouth.org.uk

History
- Status: Parish Church
- Dedication: Saint Peter

Architecture
- Architect: G. E. Street
- Style: Gothic Revival
- Completed: 1879

Specifications
- Height: Spire 202 feet (62 m)
- Materials: Purbeck stone with Bath stone dressings

Administration
- Province: Canterbury
- Diocese: Winchester
- Archdeaconry: Bournemouth
- Deanery: Bournemouth
- Parish: Bournemouth

Clergy
- Rector: The Reverend Canon Nicholas Jepson-Biddle

Listed Building – Grade I
- Official name: Church of St Peter
- Designated: 5 May 1952
- Reference no.: 1153014

St Peter's Church is a Church of England parish church located in the centre of Bournemouth, Dorset, England. It is a Grade I listed building classed as a major parish church, and was completed in 1879 to a design by George Edmund Street as the founding mother church of Bournemouth.

The building incorporates work by some of the finest Gothic Revival architects and artists, including Street, George Frederick Bodley, Ninian Comper, Arthur Blomfield and Edward Burne-Jones, with stained-glass windows and frescoes by Clayton and Bell. The chancel has been described as 'one of the richest Gothic Revival interiors in England'. The 202-foot (62 m)-high spire is a landmark in Bournemouth Town Centre, where it is the town centre parish church, together with the churches of St Stephen and St Augustine.

Mary Shelley, author of Frankenstein, is interred here, reputedly along with the heart of her husband, the poet Percy Bysshe Shelley.

== History ==
St Peter's was built over a period of twenty-four years from 1855 at the instigation of the first vicar of Bournemouth, the Reverend Alexander Morden Bennett, to replace an earlier building. G. E. Street was commissioned to create a finer church to match the beauty of the town. It was the founding church of Bournemouth and was constructed between 1854 and 1879 on the foundations of the 1840s predecessor. G. E. Street later designed the Royal Courts of Justice in The Strand in London. The 202-foot (62 m) tower and spire is a landmark across the town centre and beyond. It has unusual paintings, notable stained glass and alabaster. The church has a footprint of nearly 1200m^{2}.

The building was constructed in stages, each funded by public subscription, as the cost to build it as a whole was too great. The north aisle was the first part to be built, being added to the north side of the previous building in 1855, followed in 1859 by the clerestory and hammerbeam roof over the roof of the previous building, which was then removed. In 1863–1864 the chancel, eastern transepts, and vestries were built, and in 1869–1870 the 116 ft-high tower was built. The tower was not initially connected to the nave of the church, allowing a narthex and western transepts to be added between them in 1874. Finally, in 1879, the 86 ft-high spire was added to the tower, completing Street's design.

In 1914, an extension was added to the north-east corner of the church, providing a vestry, office, and song school, and a basement lounge area with kitchen, toilets, and boiler room.

In 1926, the Chapel of the Resurrection was built in the churchyard south of the church to a design by Ninian Comper. It was intended as a mortuary chapel and was dedicated as a memorial to the fallen of World War I. The chapel was renovated in 2014, with a kitchen, toilet, and heating being added.

=== Present day ===
St. Peter's Church is a parish church in the Archdeaconry of Bournemouth of the Diocese of Winchester. It sits in the Liberal Catholic tradition of the Church of England. It is the town's original parish church, and the parish church for the town centre.

It is an historical focus in the town centre, with multiple burials of note, and is also a shared community space, for people to come in, walk around and just 'be', with the community cafe, Parry's, open Wednesday-Friday and with freely accessible music and performance at its heart.

During the summer of 2020, churchwarden Jane Styslinger set up the Grounds Reimagined project, to clear the near 4-acre woodland churchyard that had been neglected since 2009. The work was transformational, using grants from Bournemouth, Christchurch and Poole Council, the Dorset Wildlife Trust, Bournemouth Rotary Club, Bournemouth Parks In Mind and other local funding streams. A wildlife trail and a heritage trail have been set, with all the graves of note highlighted for historians and visitors to enjoy. The project brought members of the church, other organisations and local residents together during the summer of Covid restrictions and beyond.

During the summer of 2023, the tower and spire underwent significant stonework renovation, partially funded by the National Churches Trust and the Wolfson Foundation, as part of the church's Development Project.

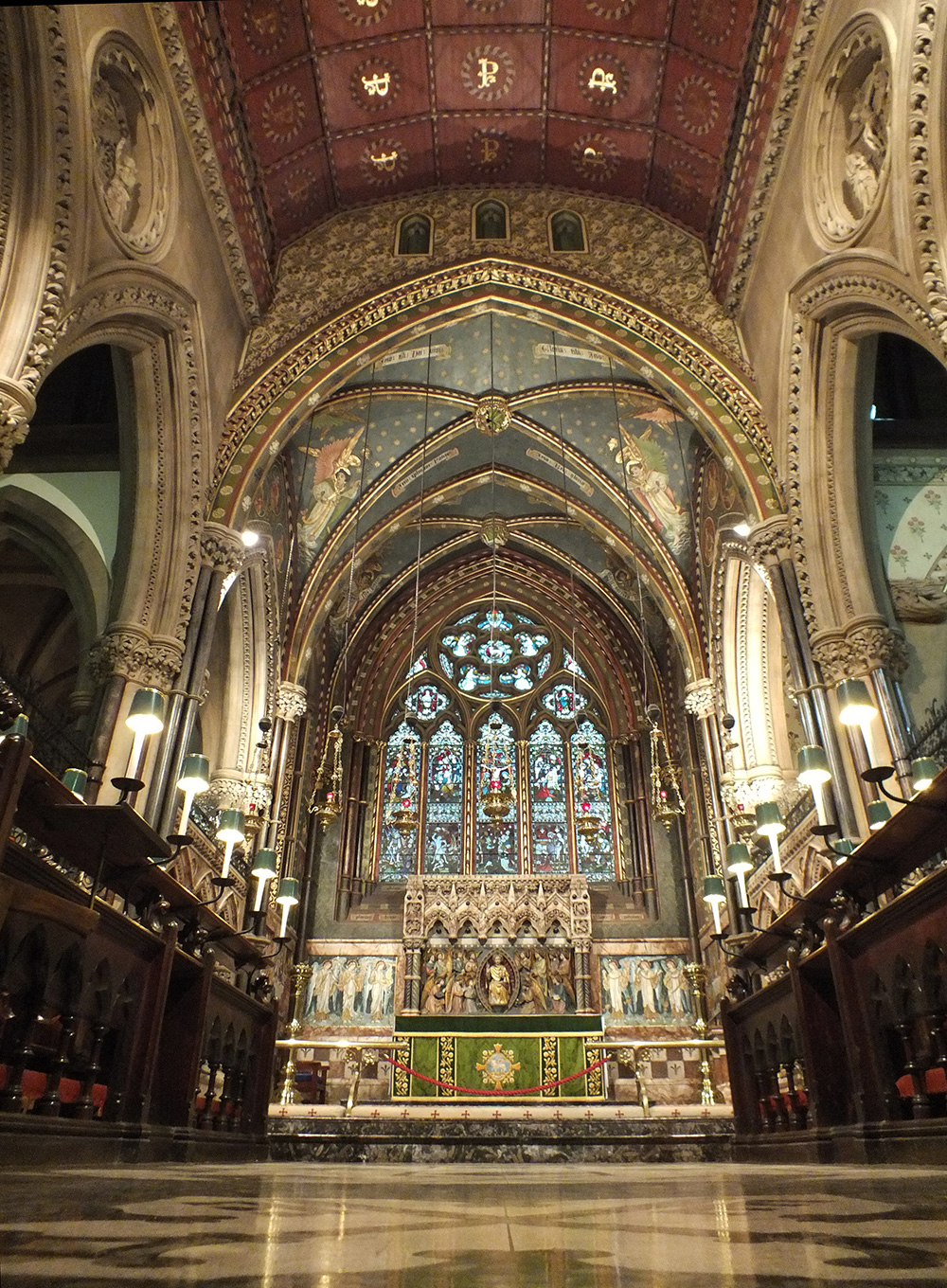
The chancel

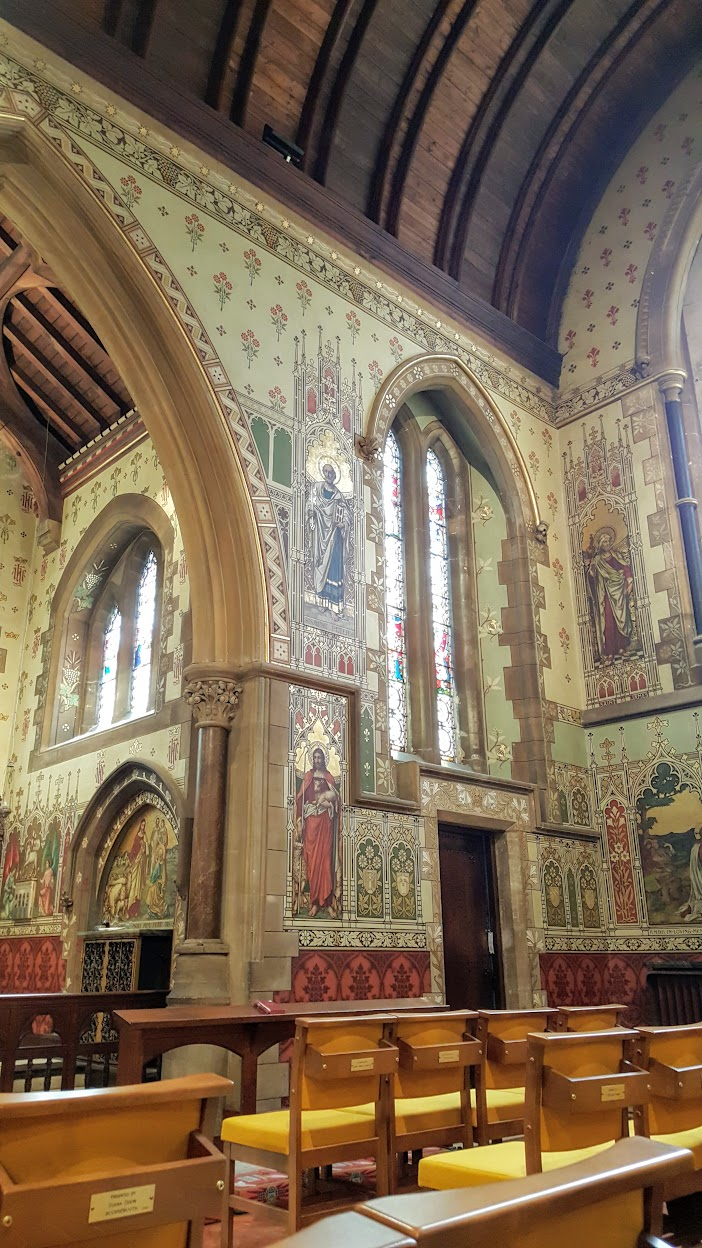
The Keble Chapel

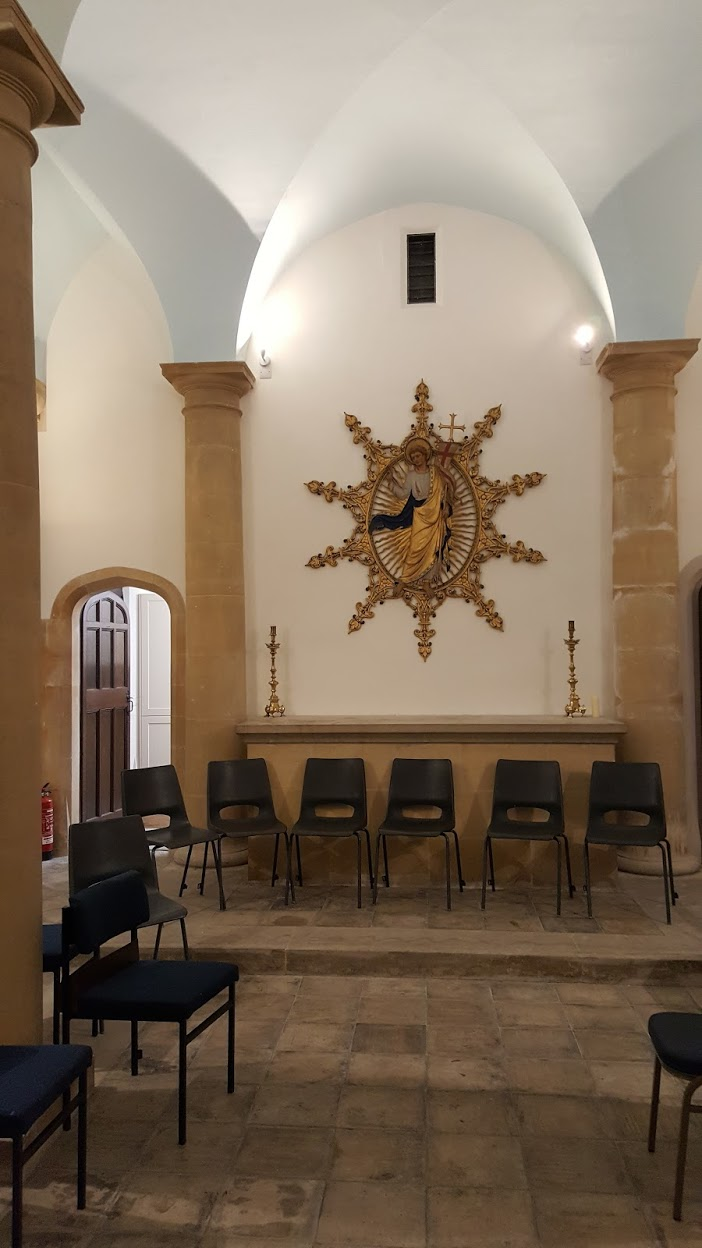
The Chapel of the Resurrection

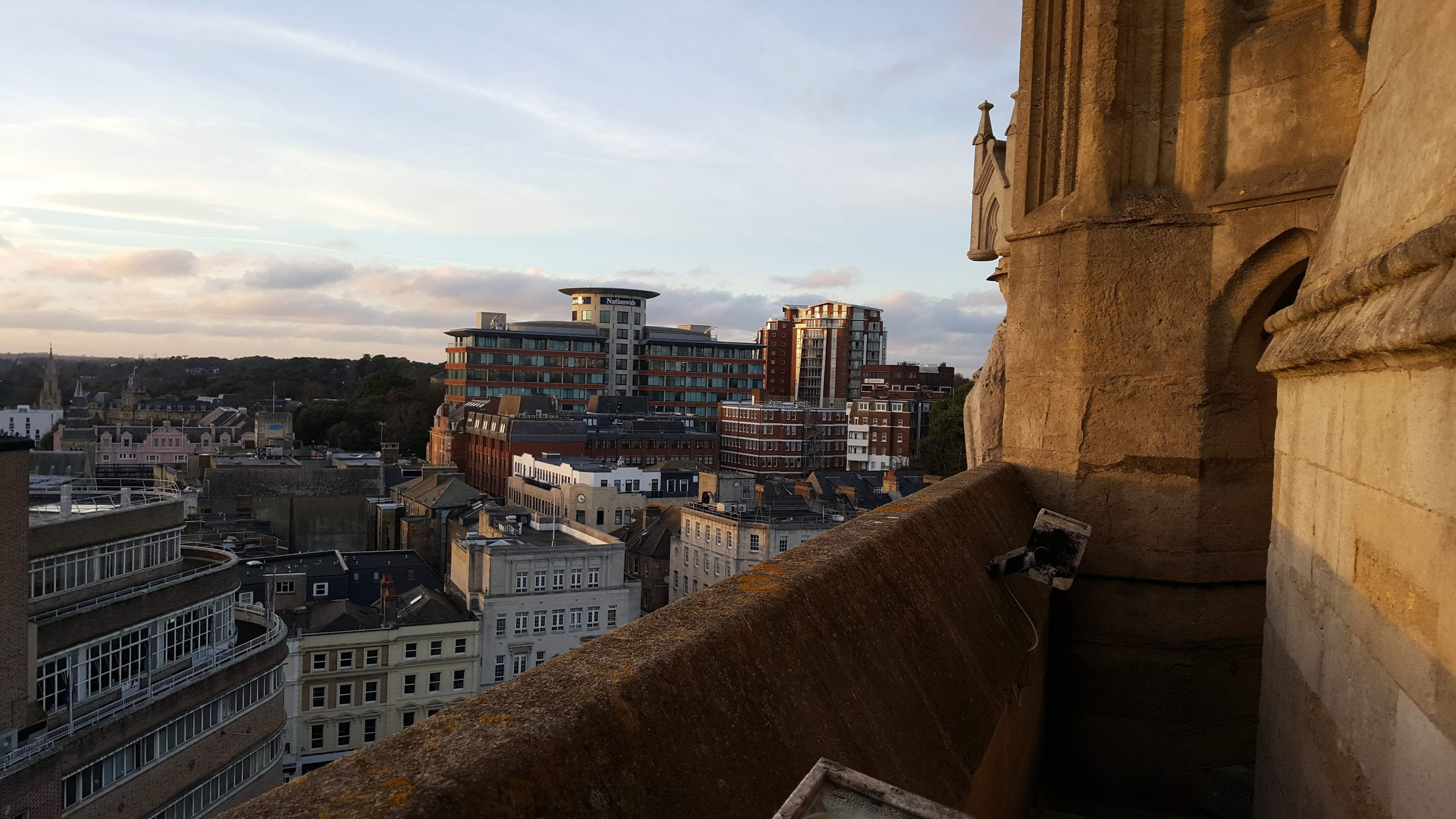
The town centre from the tower

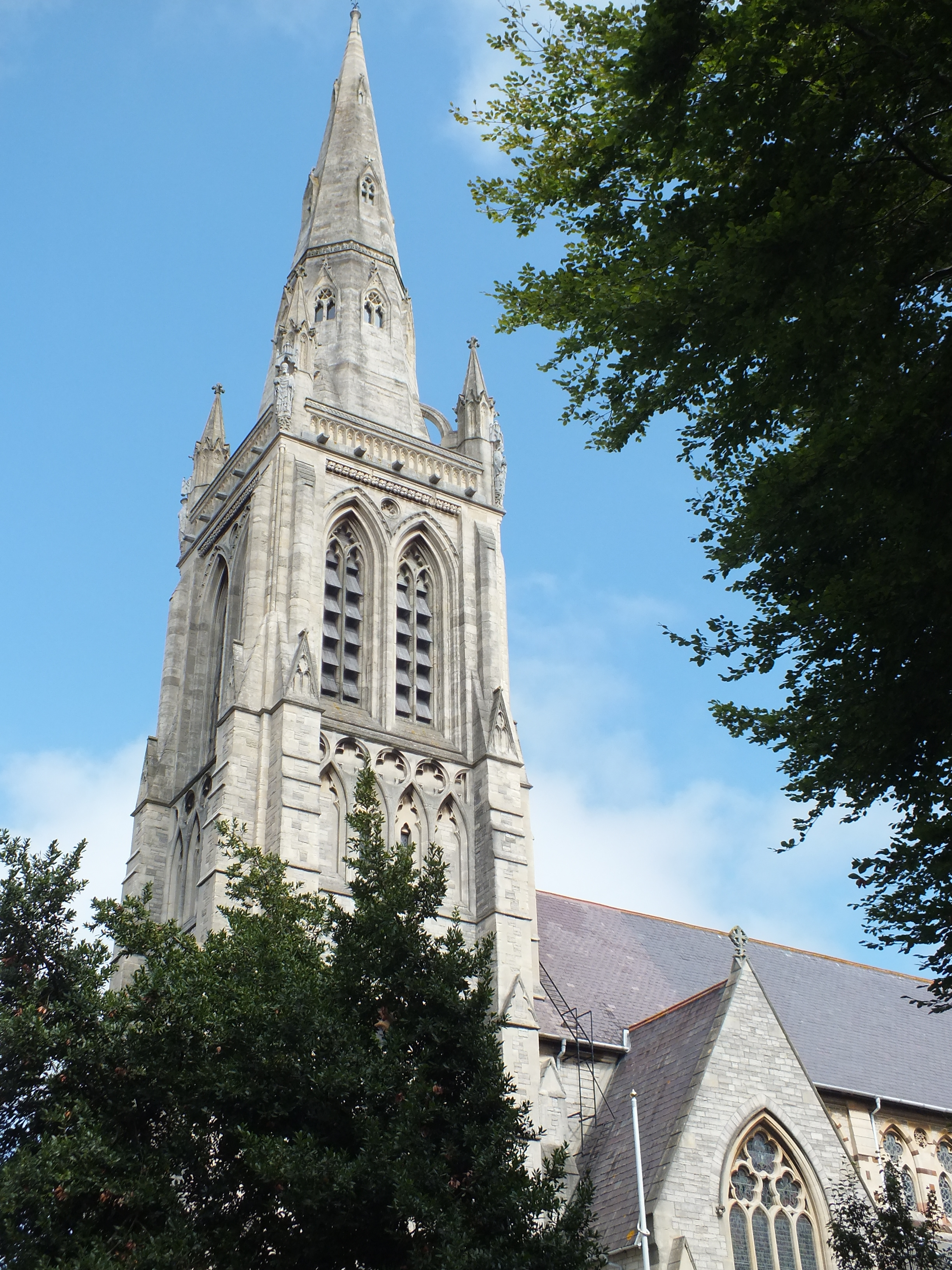
The tower and spire

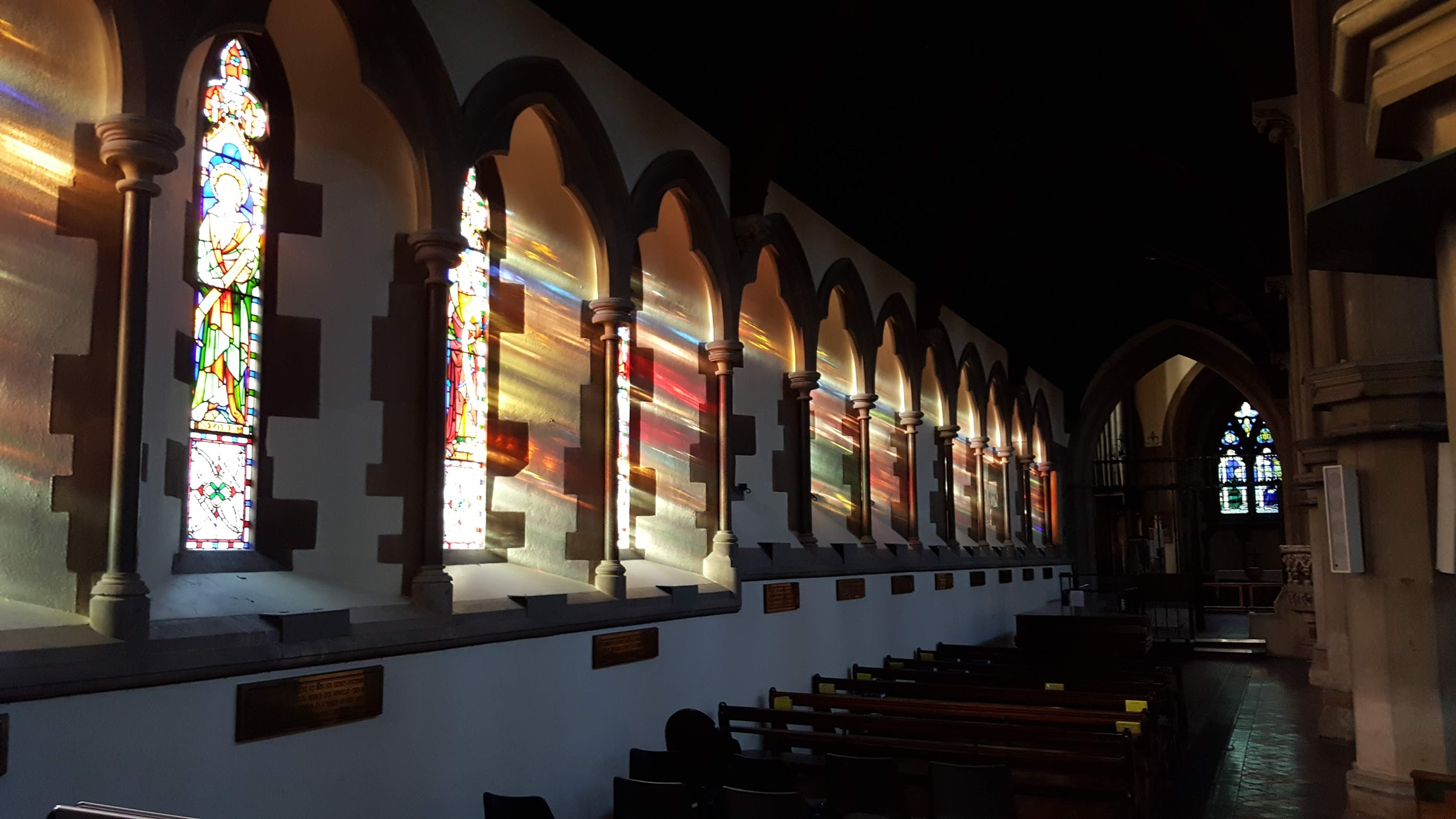
The north aisle

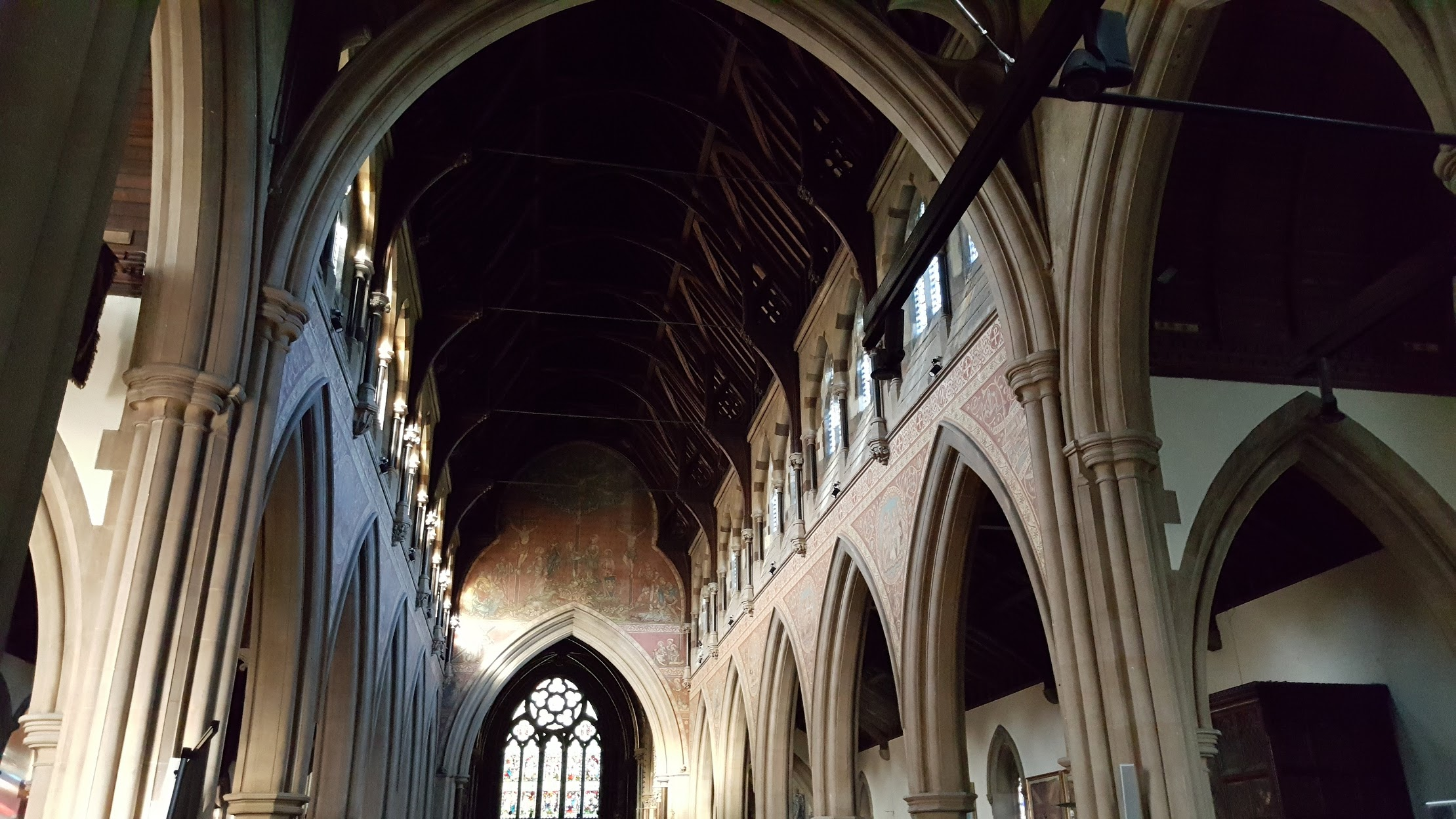
The nave roof and west transepts

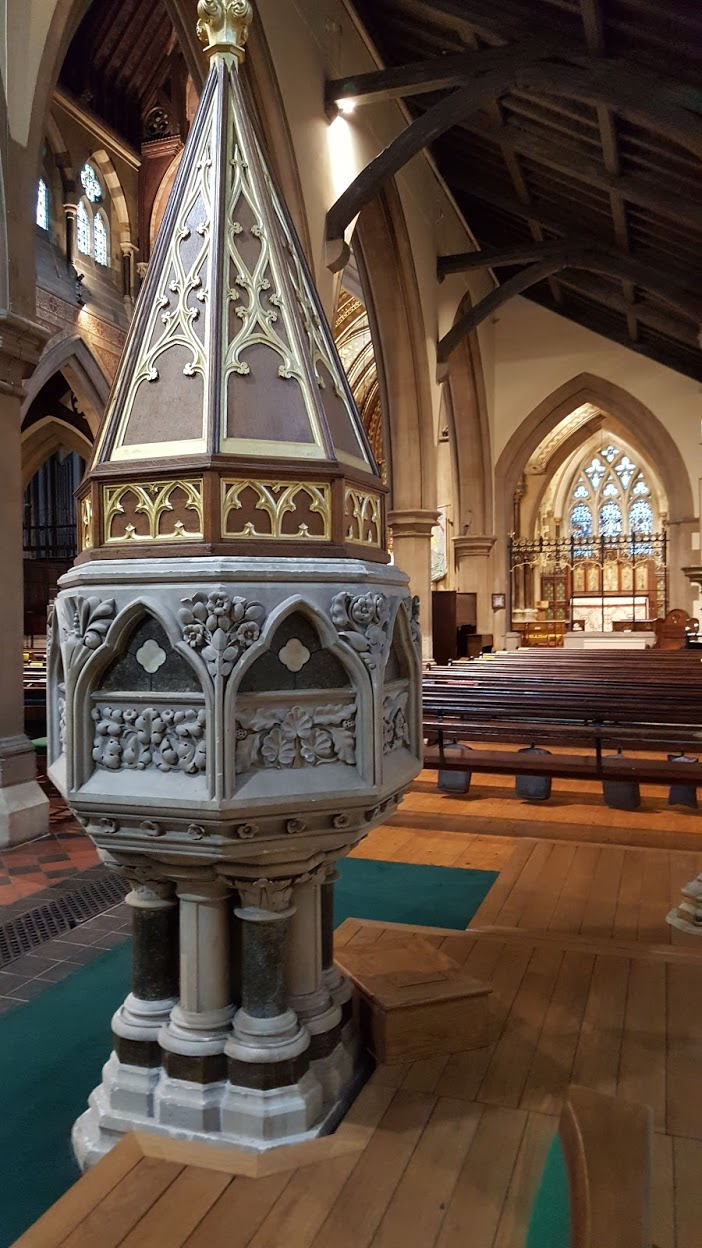
The baptistry and south aisle

== Clergy ==
Since November 2024, the priest-in-charge of Bournemouth Town Centre Parish has been the Reverend Canon Nicholas Jepson-Biddle, formerly Precentor of Wells Cathedral.

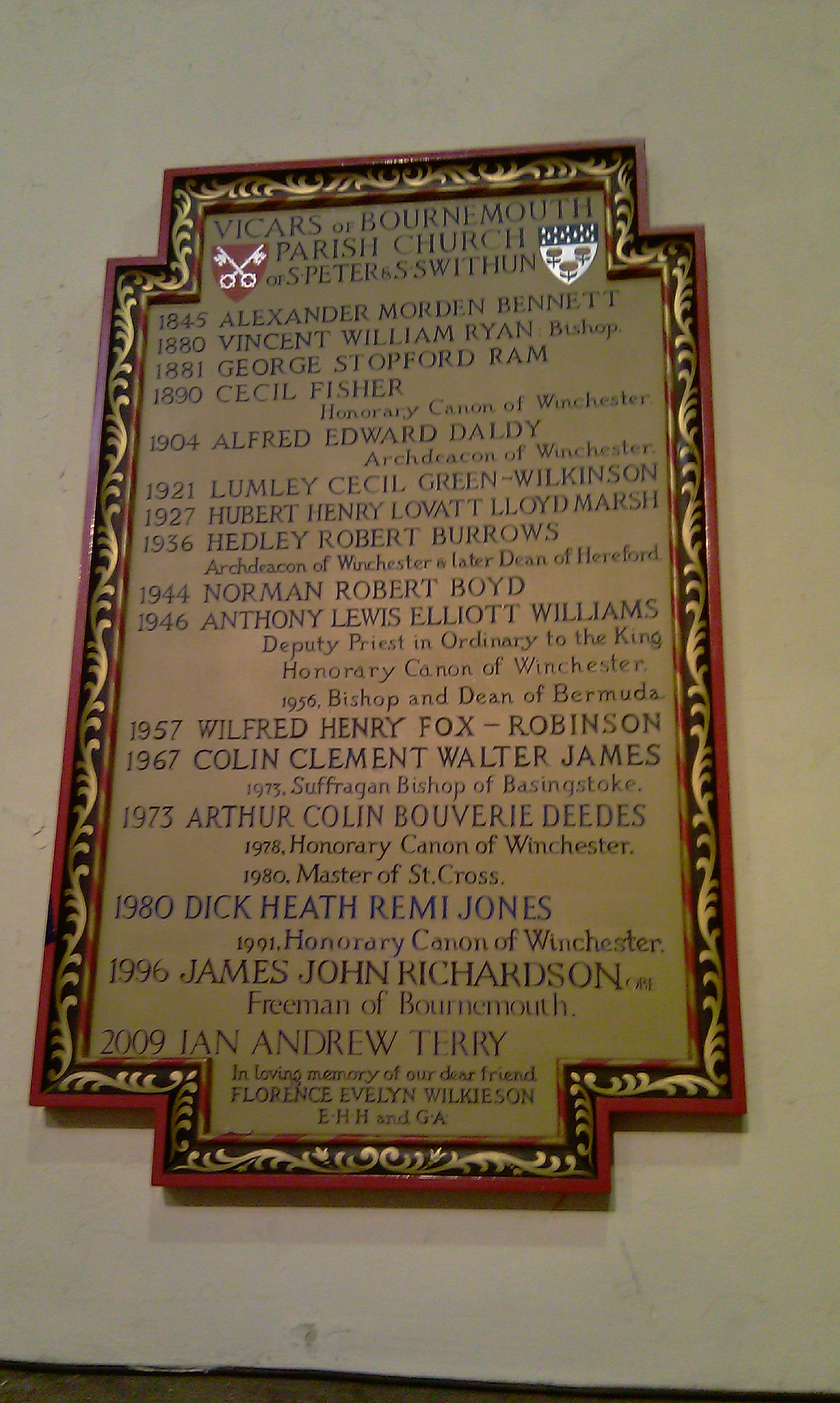
Vicars of St Peter's Church

=== Vicars of St. Peter's (Note: Noticeboard in the church, located near the font.) ===
- 1845 – Alexander Morden Bennett
- 1880 – Vincent William Ryan (formerly Bishop of Mauritius)
- 1881 – George Stopford Ram
- 1890 – Cecil Edward Fisher
- 1904 – Alfred Edward Daldy (also Archdeacon of Winchester)
- 1921 – Lumley Cecil Green-Wilkinson
- 1927 – Hubert Henry Lovatt Lloyd Marsh
- 1936 – Hedley Robert Burrows (also Archdeacon of Winchester and later Dean of Hereford)
- 1944 – Norman Robert Boyd
- 1946 – Anthony Lewis Elliott Williams (later Bishop of Bermuda)
- 1957 – Wilfred Henry Fox-Robinson
- 1967 – Colin Clement Walter James (later Bishop of Winchester)

=== Rectors of Bournemouth Town Centre Parish ===
- 1973 – Arthur Colin Bouverie Deedes (later Master of St Cross)
- 1980 – Dick Heath Remi Jones
- 1996 – James John Richardson (awarded the OBE in 2006 for services to the Church of England.)
- 2009 – Ian Andrew Terry
- 2024 – Nicholas Jepson-Biddle (formerly Precentor of Wells Cathedral)

== Music ==
=== Choirs ===
==== History ====
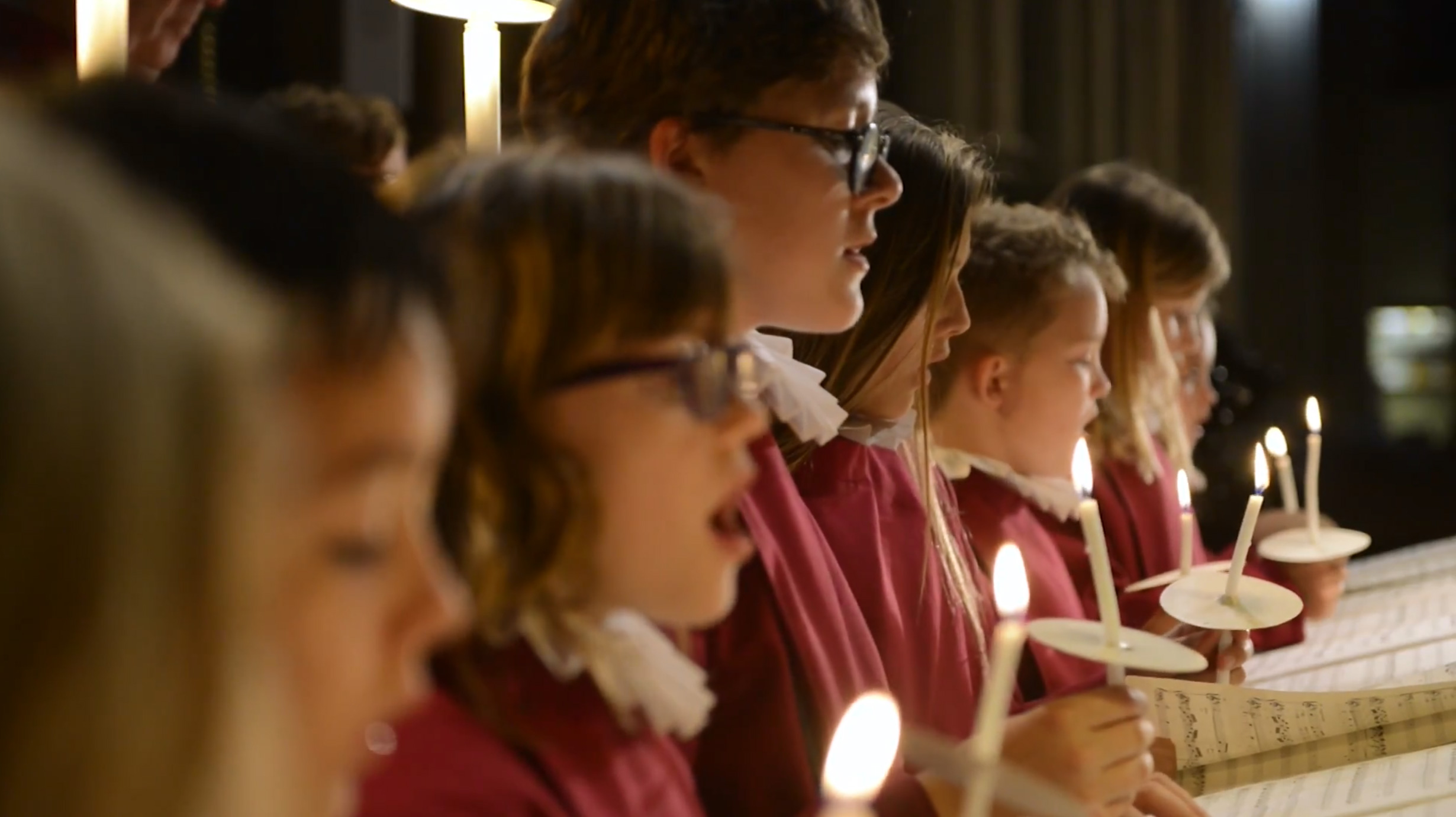
The choristers singing during a filming session in 2017

St Peter's has always maintained a choral tradition as a key part of its ministry. In 1865, on completion of the chancel and east transepts, a Choir Home was started, where eight of the eighteen choristers (known as 'Home Boys') boarded under the care of a matron, while the other ten (known as 'Town Boys') lived in the town. All of the choristers were educated at St Peter's School, which had opened in 1850 on land next to the church. The choir sang evensong every day, the Litany on Wednesday and Friday, and a total of four services each Sunday.

As Bournemouth grew larger, there was no longer any need to recruit choristers from elsewhere, and the Choir Home was closed in 1924. This also meant that much the population moved out to the new suburbs, leading to the opening of new schools, and St. Peter's School closed in 1935. The choir continued to grow in size and accomplishment as a traditional choir of men and boys throughout the twentieth century. The girls section of the choir was created in 2009.

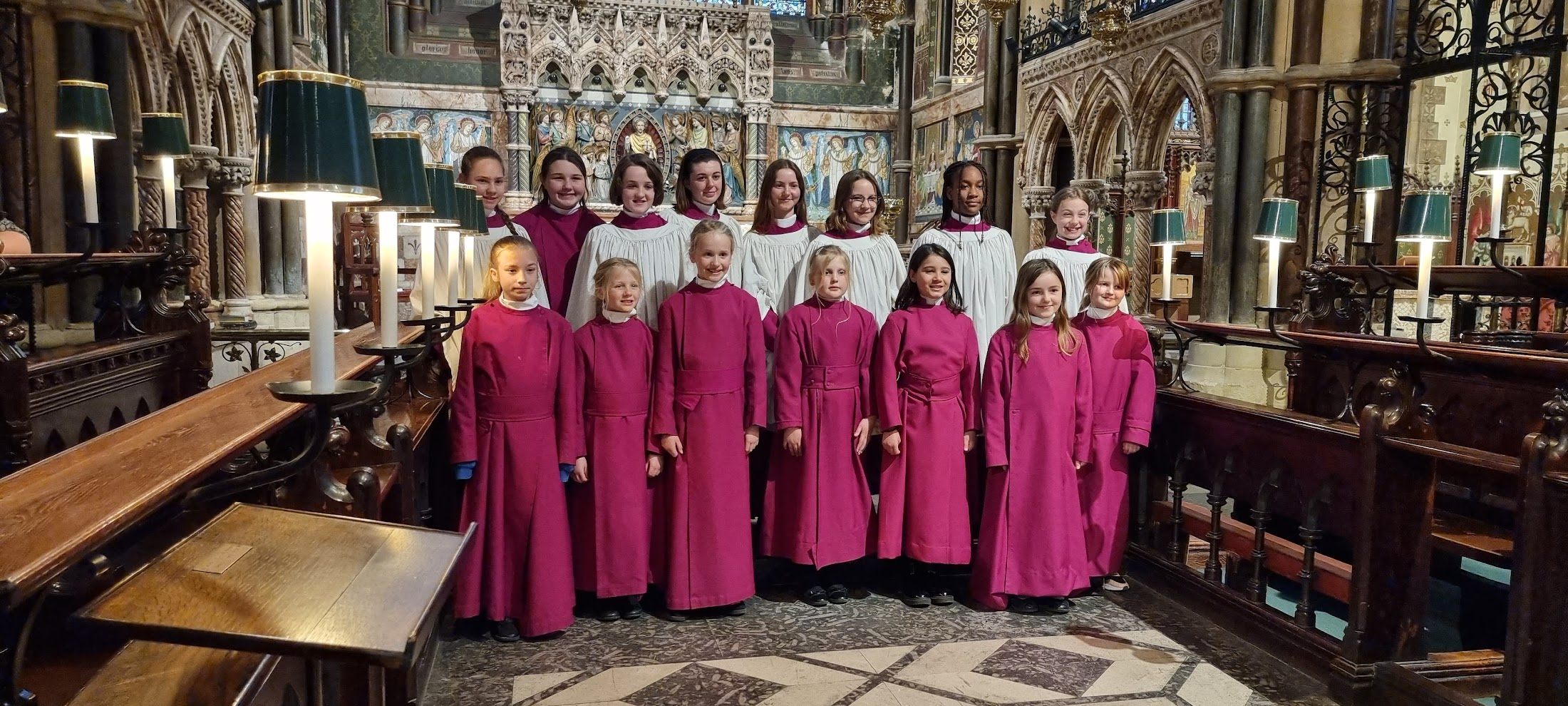
The girl choristers in 2023

==== Today ====
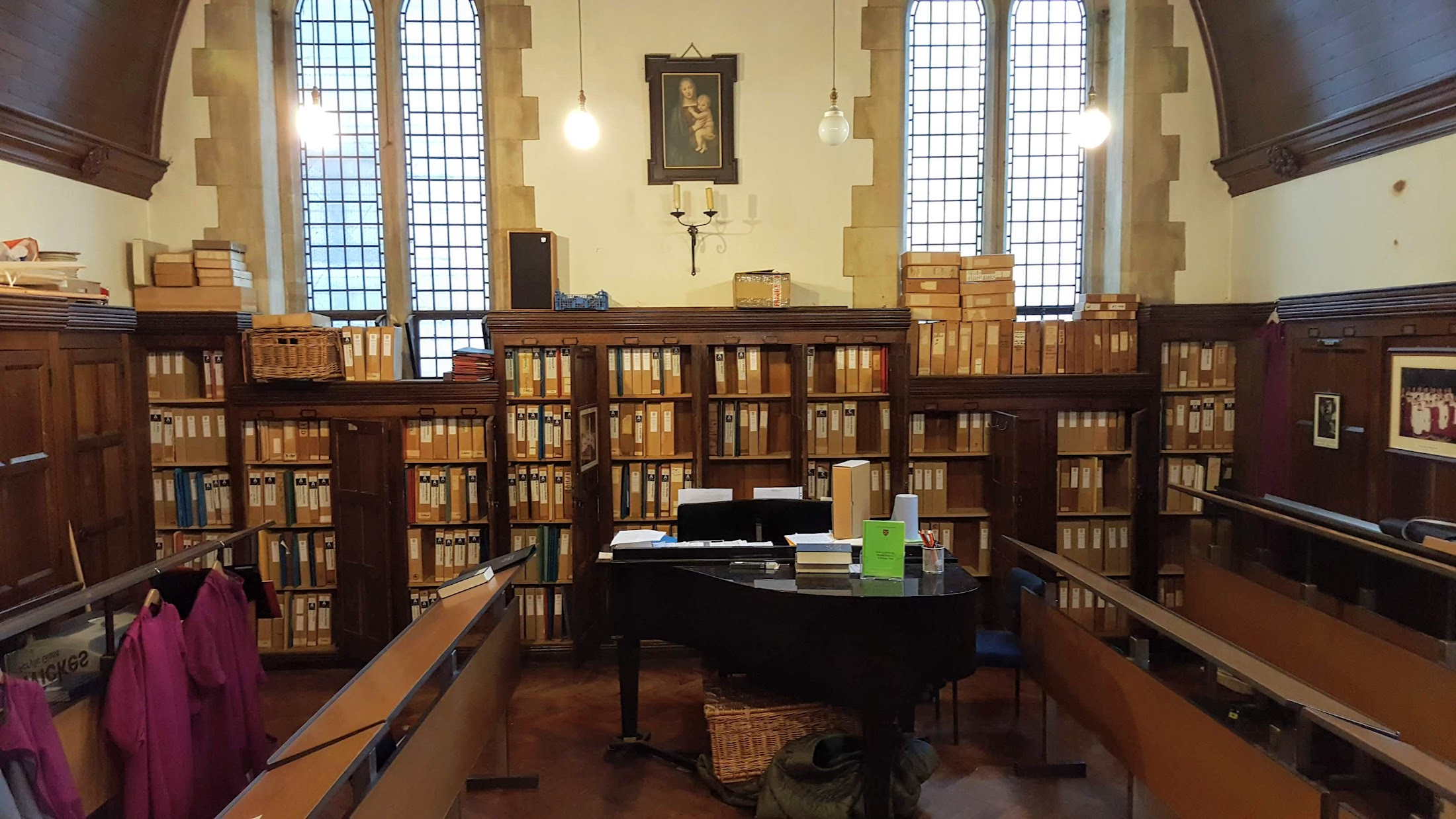
The song school

The choir now comprises up to sixteen girl choristers aged between nine and eighteen, and nine professional lay clerks, who provide the music for the Eucharist on most Sundays and on principal feasts. The choir has sung as a visiting choir at a number of British cathedrals and major churches and occasionally makes recordings. There is also an adult parish choir which sings for one Sunday per month.

The choir rehearses in the song school, a purpose-built barrel-roofed space with piano, stalls, music and robing storage, and office. The song school was built in 1914 as part of the north-east extension of the church - the space in the north-east transept formerly occupied by the choir's vestry became the new organ chamber.

The choir is directed by the Director of Music, currently Duncan Courts, and accompanied by the Assistant Organist, currently Ian Harrison.

The St. Peter's Choral Foundation was created in 2021 as a registered charity. Its aim is to support the funding and development of the choir and its activities, as well as promoting the English choral tradition and singing education in Bournemouth.

=== Organs ===
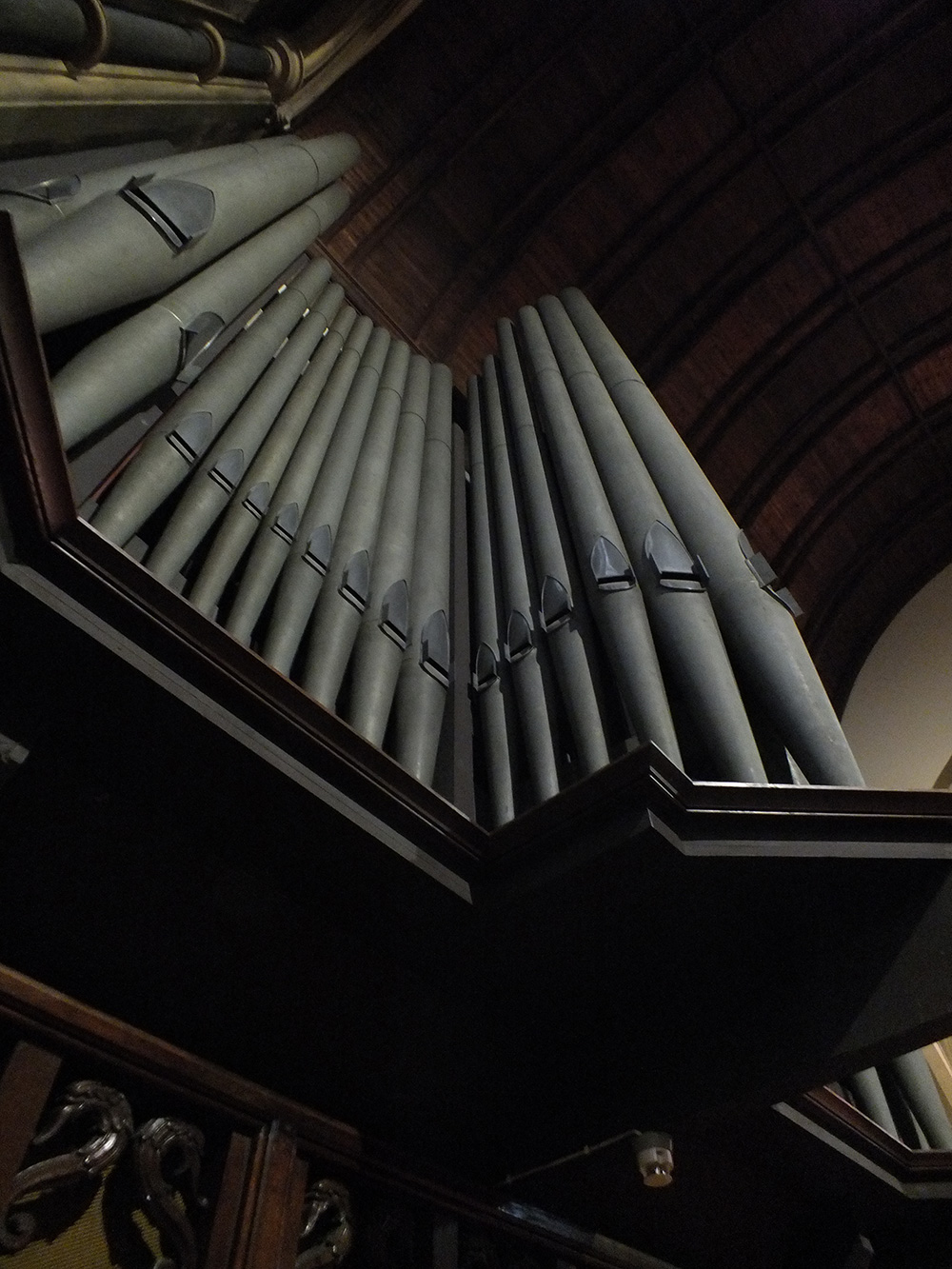
The Harrison organ facade from the north transept

==== The Duncan and Bates organs (1843–1870) ====
The first organ in St Peter's was built for the opening of the previous 'Mock-Gothic' building of 1845. It was built by a Mr. J. Duncan of Poole, who was also the first organist. As Street's work began to replace the old building from 1855, this instrument was moved about, first from its west gallery to the new north aisle in 1856, then into the north-east transept soon after 1864 when the east end was completed. In this last position, with the majority of the new church complete, the organ was found to be 'nearly worn out' and of 'insufficient power'. As a temporary measure, a second-hand instrument was bought from Vauxhall Gardens in London, probably in 1865. This had been built by Bates of London in 1840, and originally consisted of seven stops on a single manual.

There is no record of its specification after being rebuilt in Bournemouth, but the organ was sold to St John's, Carlton Hill in Brighton in 1870, and the pipework was later re-used in a 1997 instrument in St Laurence, Falmer in East Sussex – this specification is not much larger. It is reasonable to speculate that the move to Bournemouth may have only added the Bourdon pedal pipes. Nonetheless, contemporary sources described the Bates organ as 'ugly-looking' and as occupying the whole north transept. Funds were sought to provide a case and pipe decoration, but Alexander Morden Bennett desired an instrument more worthy of the church and attention quickly turned to the idea of a new organ.

==== The Willis organ (1870–1914) ====
In 1869 Alexander Morden Bennett placed an order with Henry Willis for a new organ costing £700. Street's new building was largely completed, lacking only west transepts and tower, and the temporary Bates instrument was ineffectual in the new building. Morden Bennett's choice may also have been influenced by the largely-new organ by Willis in nearby Christchurch Priory which was of a similar size to the new St Peter's instrument and completed in 1865. The entirely new organ, of 24 stops over three manuals and pedals and with 1292 pipes, was dedicated on St Luke's Day in 1870. The organ occupied a chamber on the east side of the north transept, next to the sanctuary, and the front pipes were decorated with coloured diaper work in 1873 in keeping with its location. The specification of the organ is here:. Willis cleaned the instrument in 1892, but by 1912 it was described as 'nearly worn out and hardly worth repairing'.

==== The Harrison organ (1914 to present day) ====
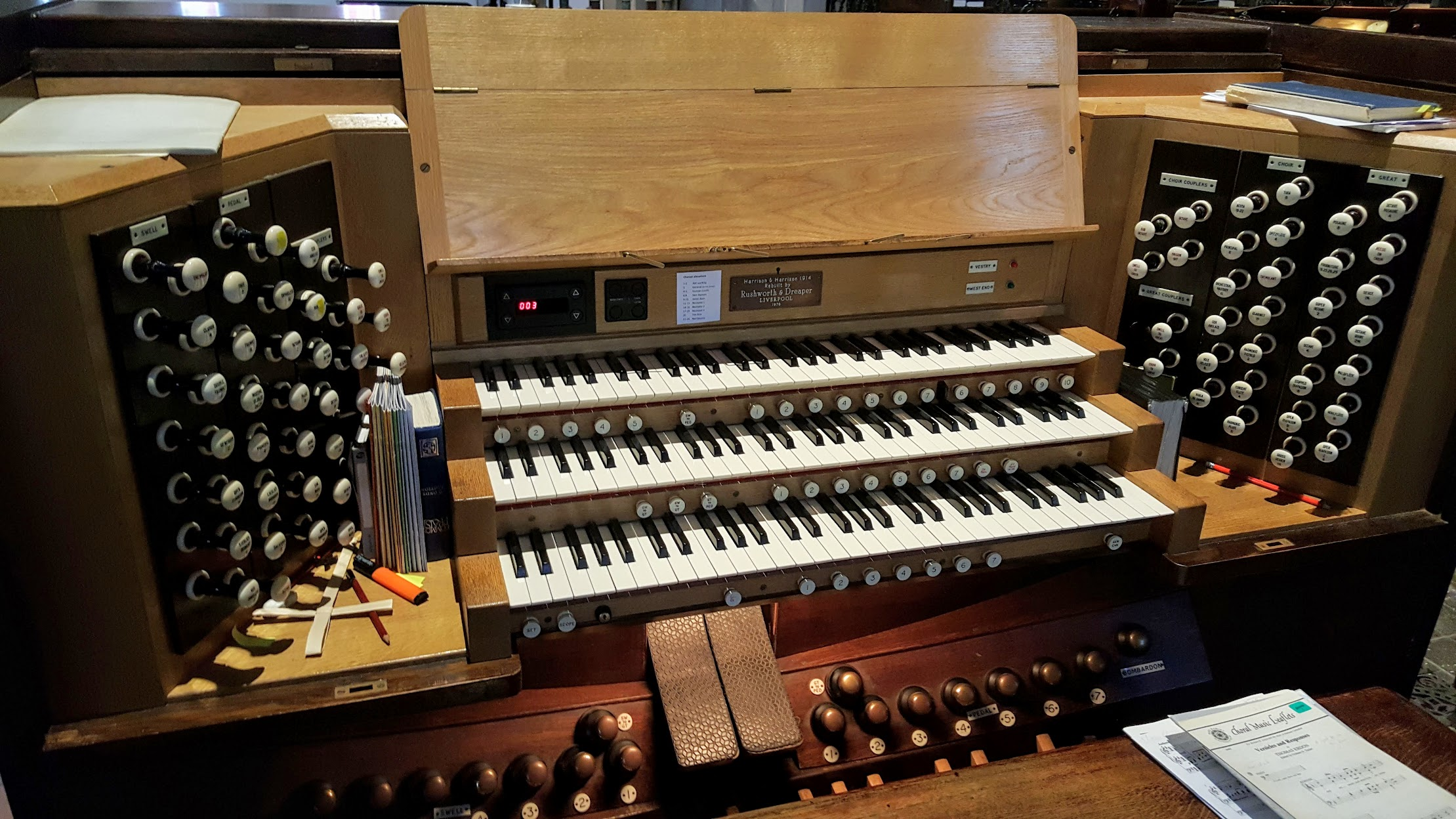
The organ console

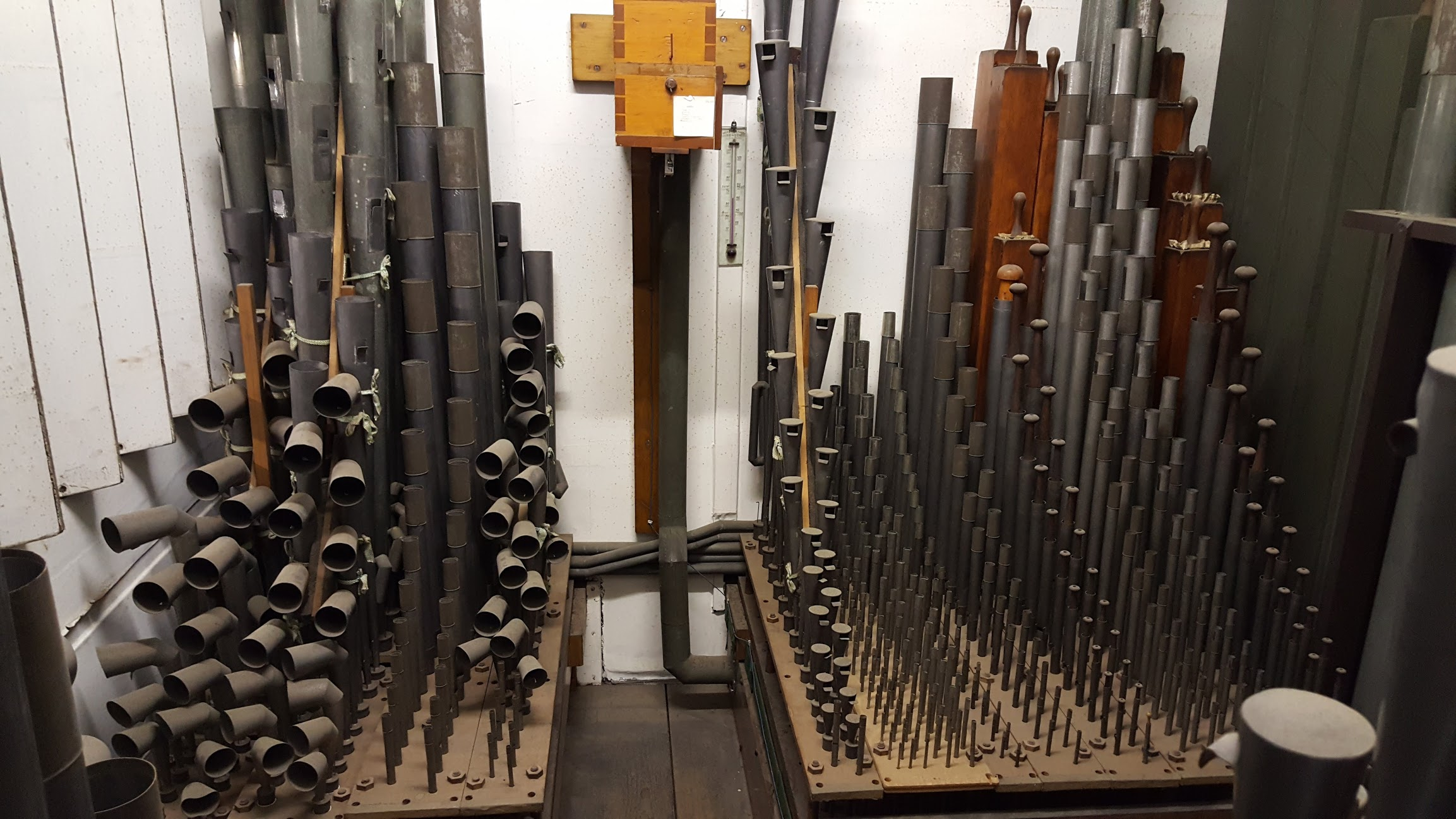
Some of the Swell pipework in the organ

In 1913, the church launched an appeal for a new and much larger organ, together with new purpose-built vestries on the north-east corner of the church. A contract was signed with Harrison and Harrison of Durham to build an instrument of 48 stops over three manuals and pedals, eventually costing over £2700. The organ was built in a new chamber created in the space formerly occupied by the vestries on the east side of the north-east transept. The area next to it formerly occupied by the Willis organ became the Annunciation chapel with a painted window by Comper. Much of the Willis pipework was incorporated into the new specification, which can be seen here:. Arthur Harrison is said to have taken 'infinite pains with it, and had special difficulties to contend with owing to the distance of the instrument from the main body of the church'.

A case for the new instrument was designed by Ninian Comper, but the estimated cost of £750 was never found and the instrument remained caseless except for plain dark pine panelling up to the pipe feet.

The organ was overhauled by the Liverpool firm of Rushworth and Dreaper in 1976, increasing the size to 54 stops and adding a detached console on a moveable platform at the front of the nave. The original Harrison built-in console was dismantled and the fittings removed from the church, and the plain front panelling was replaced with a carved wooden screen from the nearby and recently-closed Holy Trinity Church. (Note: Holy Trinity Church was built, at 161 Old Christchurch Road, in 1868–1869 (tower added 1878) in Italian Romanesque style, designed by Cory & Ferguson of Carlisle; it was deconsecrated in 1973, and burnt down in 1979. Now the site of a hideous office building, unimaginatively called "Trinity.") Various repairs and small modifications have taken place over the years, but following its centenary, the instrument is in need of a full overhaul.

=== Organists (Note: Church leaflet, 'The Organs of St. Peter's Church, Bournemouth'.) ===
- 1859 – J. H. Caseley (formerly assistant organist, Worcester Cathedral)
- ? – William Henry Beare
- 1868? – Mr. Taylor
- 1869 – Thomas Burton
- 1880 – Duncan Hume
- 1905 – James Chandler BMus FRCO (formerly organist and choirmaster, All Saints Wokingham)
- 1946 – Charles Palmer, BMus FRCO
- 1953 – Michael Peterson MA FRCO (later organist, Tewkesbury Abbey)
- 1966 – Harry Sayles (temporary appointment - formerly assistant organist, Guildford Cathedral)
- 1967 – Frederick Hewitt MA MusB FRCO
- 1968 – Cyril Knight FRCO
- 1971 – John Belcher MA FRCO (formerly assistant organist, Chester Cathedral, later organist, St Asaph Cathedral and Tewkesbury Abbey)
- 1981 – Martin Firth (later director of music, UWE)
- 1985 – Stephen Carleston MA FRCO (also head of music, Bournemouth School, and later director of music, Bolton Parish Church)
- 1993 – David Beeby BMus FRCO (later head of music, Poole Grammar School)
- 2002 – Charles Spanner BMus
- 2003 – Ben Lamb MusB (later director of music, Lichfield Cathedral)
- 2007 – Stephen Le Prevost BA FTCL (formerly assistant organist, Westminster Abbey)
- 2008 – David Coram (formerly assistant organist, Romsey Abbey)
- 2011 – Sam Hanson MA ARCO (formerly organ scholar, Jesus College, Cambridge)
- 2015 – Duncan Courts AdvDip ARCO (formerly assistant director of music)

== Bells ==
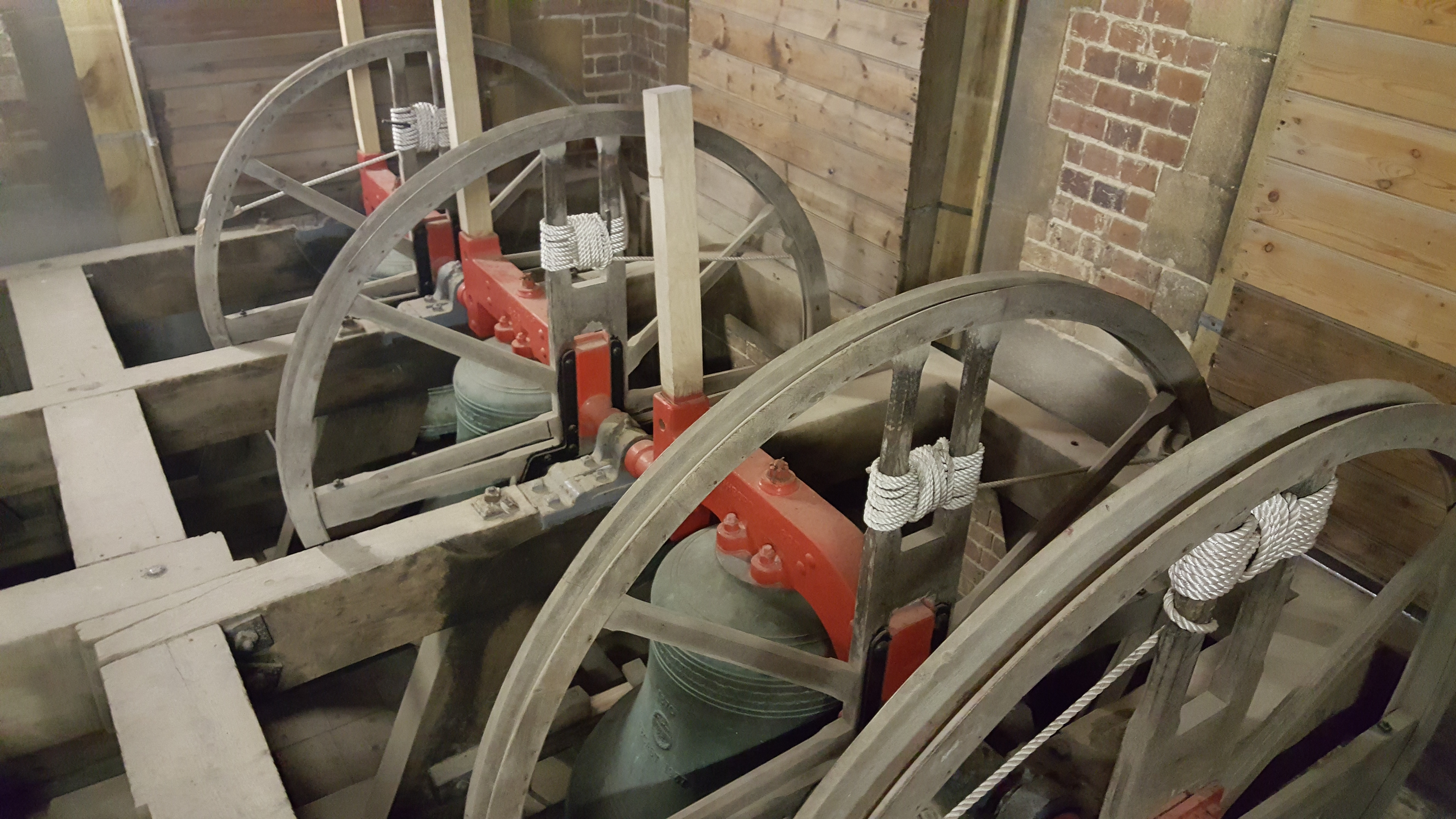
Three of the bells in the tower

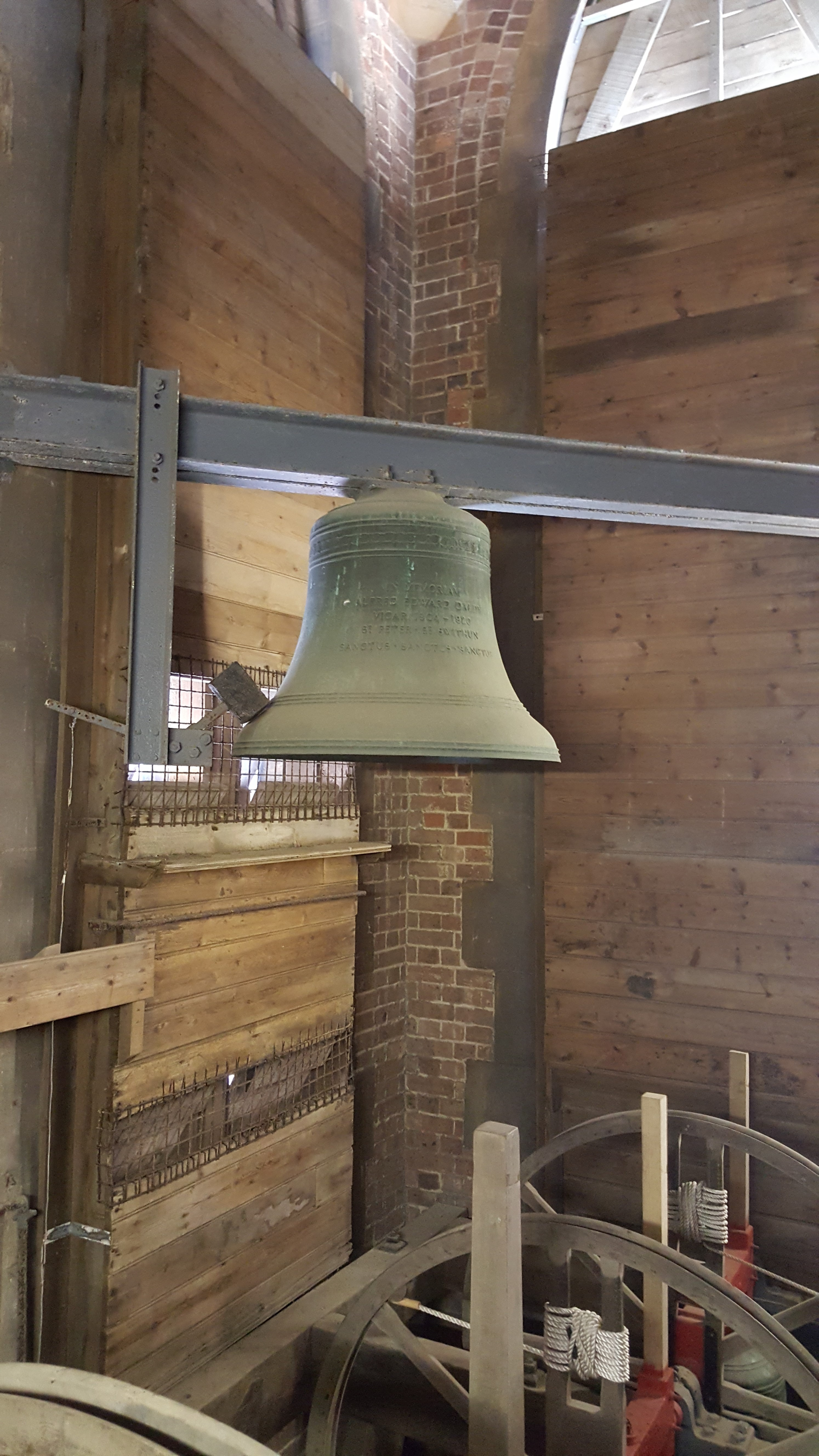
The Sanctus bell, hung in the tower for chiming

St Peter's has the heaviest ring of bells in Bournemouth, and was the first church in the town to receive a ring of bells. There are eight bells hung for full circle ringing in the English style of change ringing and a Sanctus bell which is chimed by a switch in the chancel.

When the tower was completed in 1870, it was intended to be equipped with a peal of bells, and a bell-chamber, ringing chamber, and circular stairway were provided. When Morden Bennett, the founding priest, succumbed to a serious illness, members of the church and town organised an appeal to raise funds for an additional six bells, augmenting the existing two, to honour him. The bells were manufactured by Taylor's of Loughborough and were dedicated at Whitsun in 1871, on Morden Bennett's recovery. At the dedication, the Ancient Society of College Youths rang a peal consisting of 518 grandsire triples, 672 and 216 Stedman's triples, and 576 treble bob majors.

In 1936, the church proposed re-hanging and re-tuning the existing ring and adding a Sanctus bell as "a distinct and beautiful memorial" to Alfred Daldy, a previous incumbent who had died the previous year. It was found that the bells were in a poor state, and Taylor's suggested re-casting the bells because many improvements had been made in bell-casting since 1871, a transitional period in this skill. At the time, this was still the only peal of bells in Bournemouth, and after recasting by Taylor's, they were dedicated on 20 November 1937.

Number	Date	Note	Maker	Mass		
Number	Date	Note	Maker	long measure	lb	kg
1	1937	E	John Taylor & Co	5 long cwt 0 qr 2 lb	562	255
2	1937	D#	John Taylor & Co	5 long cwt 2 qr 0 lb	616	279
3	1937	C#	John Taylor & Co	5 long cwt 3 qr 13 lb	657	298
4	1937	B	John Taylor & Co	7 long cwt 1 qr 3 lb	815	370
5	1937	A	John Taylor & Co	9 long cwt 1 qr 8 lb	1,044	474
6	1937	G#	John Taylor & Co	10 long cwt 3 qr 18 lb	1,222	554
7	1937	F#	John Taylor & Co	15 long cwt 0 qr 2 lb	1,682	763
8	1937	E	John Taylor & Co	20 long cwt 2 qr 7 lb	2,303	1,045
Sanctus	1937	G	John Taylor & Co	9 long cwt 2 qr 25 lb	1,089	494

== Notable worshippers and burials ==
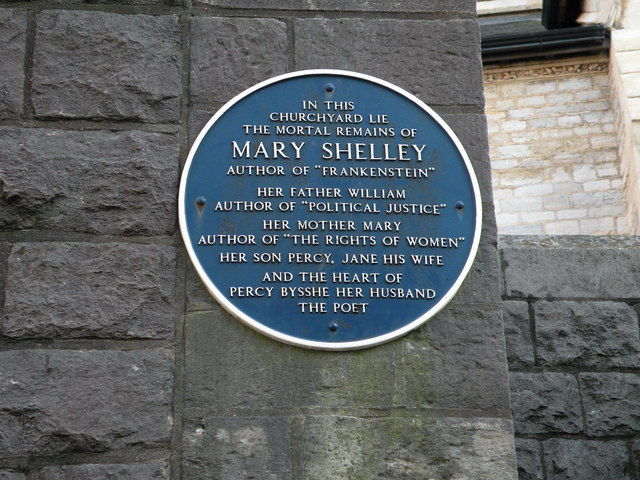
Blue plaque for Mary Shelley

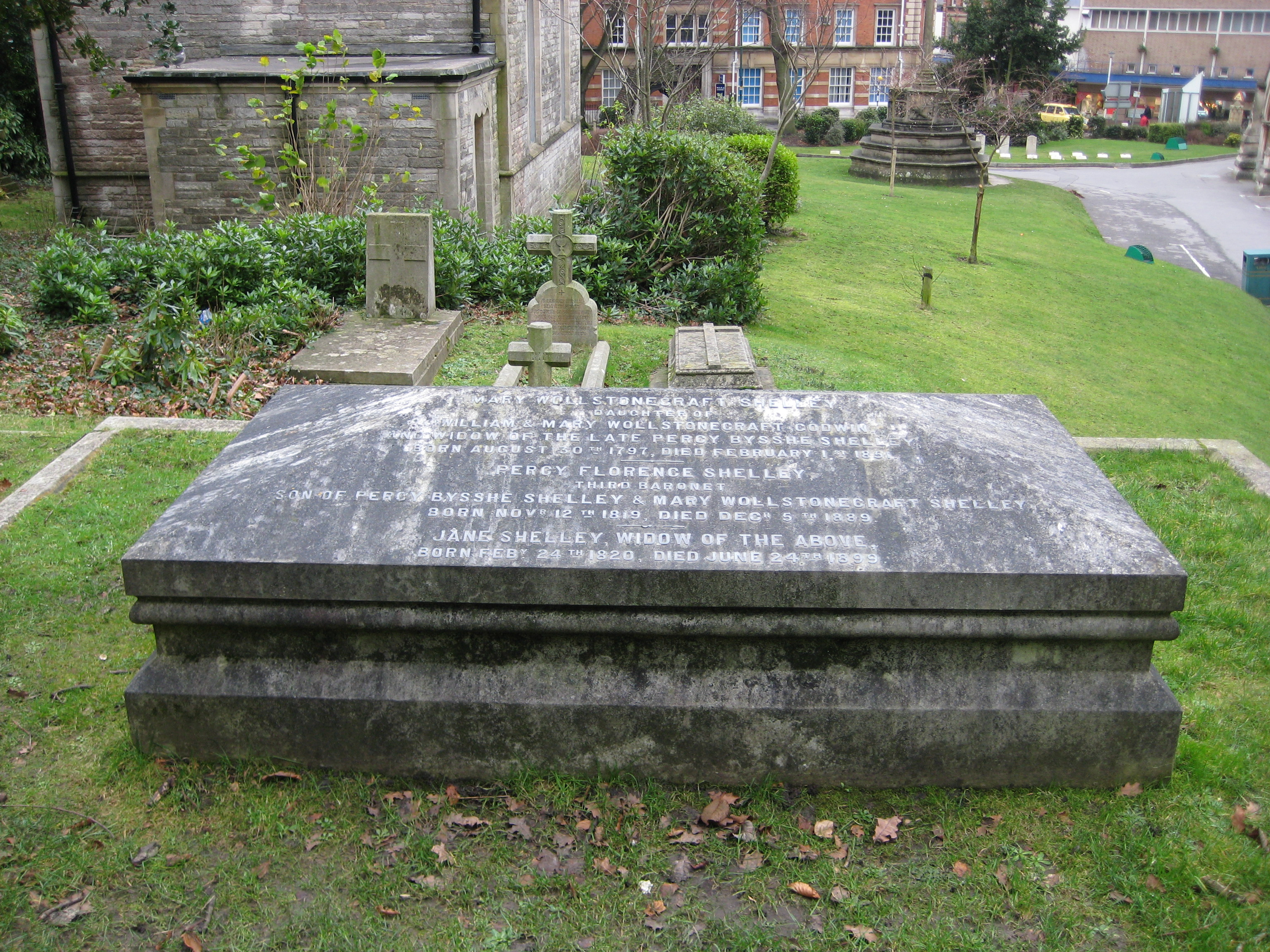
The Shelley tomb

St Peter's has a number of famous connections:

- William Ewart Gladstone, four-times British Prime Minister, took his last communion here in 1898.
- The composer Sir Hubert Parry was born in the parish in 1848. His mother Isabella died of consumption, aged 32, twelve days after the birth and she was buried in the churchyard. Hubert was baptised in the church two days later.
- John Keble, one of the leaders of the Oxford Movement, vicar of Hursley, a village south-west of Winchester (where he is buried in the churchyard of All Saints’ Church), and professor of poetry at Oxford, died in the parish in 1866. There are two stained-glass windows of him in his cassock in the church, and the Keble Chapel was dedicated in the south-east transept in his memory.
- Sir Dan Godfrey, the conductor and champion of British music, who founded the Bournemouth Symphony Orchestra in 1896.
- Constantin Silvestri, the Romanian conductor, composer, and pianist, who was "compared with von Karajan and Barbirolli" and who "moulded the Bournemouth Symphony Orchestra into an orchestra of international repute".
- Major General Richard Clement Moody, the first Governor of the Falkland Islands and the founder and first Lieutenant Governor of British Columbia, and his sister Clementina Barbara, are buried in the churchyard.
- Lewis Tregonwell, founder of Bournemouth. In 1810, Tregonwell bought land from the Lord of the Manor of Christchurch and built a house next to the mouth of the River Bourne (which runs through the lower gardens today). His house was called The Mansion, and is now part of the Royal Exeter Hotel.
- Mary Shelley, author of Frankenstein, is interred here, reputedly along with the heart of her husband, the poet Percy Bysshe Shelley, who had died in Sardinia. Their only surviving child, Sir Percy Shelley, 3rd Baronet, built a house in nearby Boscombe, believing that the balmy climate would help his sick wife and his mother.
- Mary Shelley had expressed a wish to be buried with her parents, Mary Wollstonecraft, the feminist philosopher, and William Godwin, one of the founders of theoretical anarchism. Wollstonecraft and Godwin had died in London and were buried in the churchyard of St Pancras Old Church. Sir Percy and his wife had them reinterred at Bournemouth.
- The funeral of radio DJ and TV presenter Ed Stewart was held in the church in 2016.
