= Carolyn Stait =

Commodore Carolyn Stait CBE
- Born: 14 April 1957 (age 69); Birmingham, England
- Military career
- Allegiance: United Kingdom
- Branch: Royal Navy
- Service years: 1975–2007
- Rank: Commodore
- Commands: HMNB Clyde
- Awards: Commander of the Order of the British Empire

Commodore Carolyn Jane Stait, CBE (born 14 April 1957) is a retired senior officer of the Royal Navy. From 2004 to 2007, she was the first woman to command a Naval Base in Britain. As Commander of HMNB Clyde in Scotland, the home of the UK's nuclear deterrent at the Faslane Naval Base, Stait was the first woman to be selectively promoted to the rank of commodore in direct competition with male officers; with the exception of Princess Anne, who was appointed to the honorary rank of admiral and Chief Commandant for Women in the Royal Navy in 2012, no woman held a higher rank in the Royal Navy until 2015.

== Early life and education ==
Stait was born in Birmingham, the daughter of physicist Harold Stait and Kathleen (née Hooper). She attended King Edward VI Camp Hill School for Girls, leaving in 1975 with four A Levels. She joined the Royal Navy intending to use the career as a route into the diplomatic service, later embracing a lifetime naval career instead. In interviews during 2004 Stait said that she had a boyfriend who worked as an independent travel writer.

== Naval career ==
Stait began her naval career in 1975 as a Cadet Wren, working as a weapons analyst at the Culdrose facility in Cornwall. She passed out of officer training at the Britannia Royal Naval College in 1977 and was appointed a probationary third officer (sub-lieutenant) on 26 July, taking up a post as an admiral's personal assistant. Her rank was confirmed on 26 April 1978. Stait was promoted second officer (lieutenant) on 1 April 1980, and proceeded to posts in the Ministry of Defence and as Flag Lieutenant in Gibraltar. She was promoted first officer (lieutenant commander) on 1 April 1988, before attending the Staff Course in 1989.

Stait was promoted commander in 1995, and spent a first two-year period at Faslane as the executive officer of HMS Neptune at HMNB Clyde. She was promoted captain on 31 December 1998, and appointed Personal Staff Officer to the Second Sea Lord in HMNB Portsmouth. In the 1999 Queen's Birthday Honours, Stait was appointed Officer of the Order of the British Empire. Later she was appointed Deputy Director of Naval Manning from where she was promoted to commodore on 22 June 2004, before returning to Faslane as base commander. Stait stood down as base commander at Faslane in autumn 2007, and was succeeded by Commodore Christopher Hockley. She was promoted to Commander of the Order of the British Empire in the 2008 New Year Honours.
