= Bernadette Kelly =

British senior civil servant

Dame Bernadette Kelly DCB
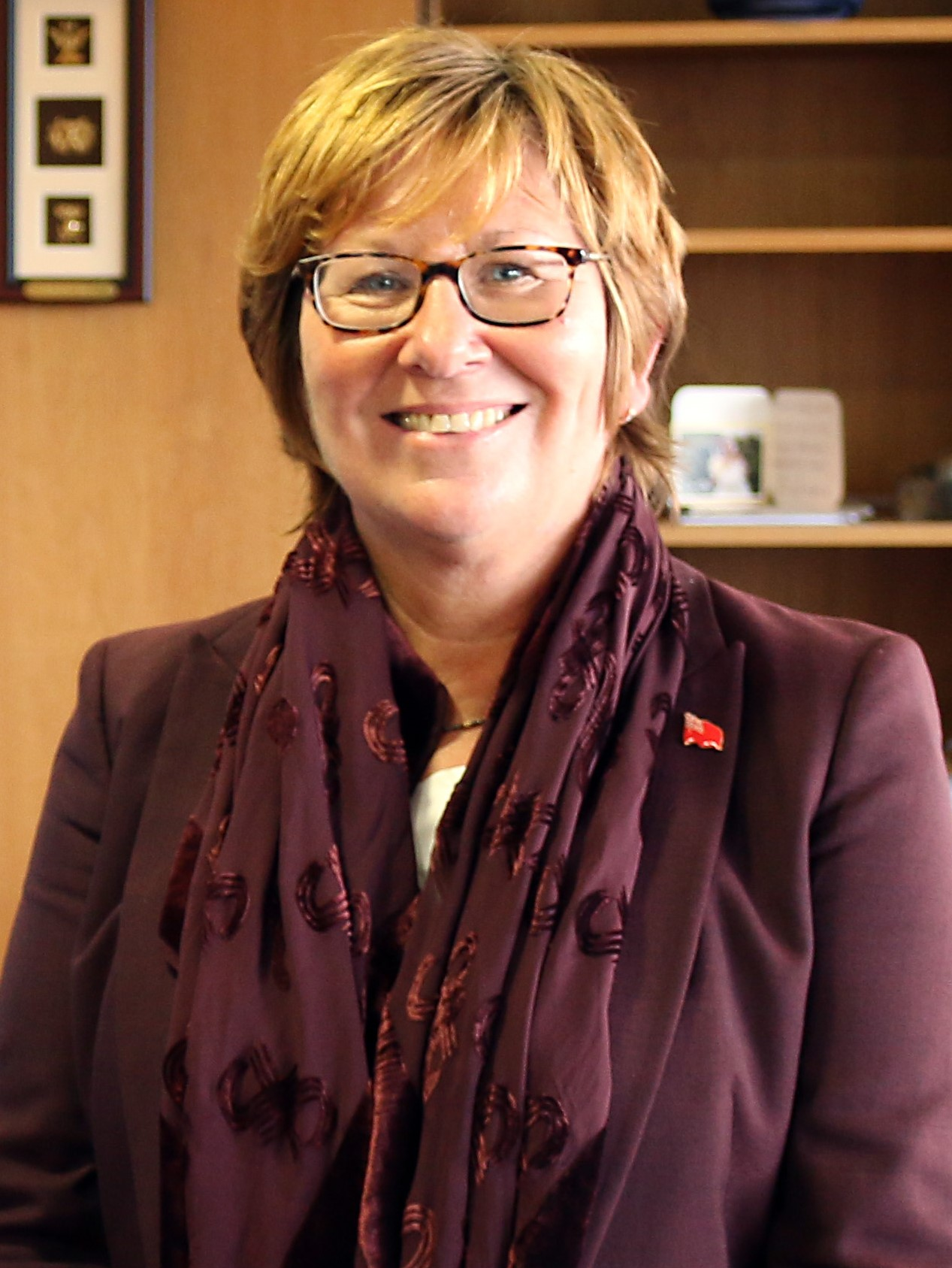
- Kelly in 2017

Permanent Secretary at the Department for Transport
- In office 18 April 2017 – June 2025
- Prime Minister: Theresa May; Boris Johnson; Liz Truss; Rishi Sunak; Keir Starmer
- Preceded by: Philip Rutnam
- Succeeded by: Jo Shanmugalingam

Personal details
- Born: 10 March 1964 (age 62)
- Occupation: Civil servant

Dame Bernadette Mary Kelly, DCB (born 10 March 1964) is a British former senior civil servant who served as permanent secretary for the Department for Transport since 18 April 2017.

== Early life ==
Kelly was born on 10 March 1964 to Edward and Teresa Kelly. Her father was a bus driver. She was educated at King Edward VI Camp Hill School for Girls in Birmingham, followed by the University of Hull. She gained an MBA at Imperial College, London.

== Career ==
Kelly joined the Civil Service after graduating, and worked in the Department for Communities and Local Government, the Treasury, Cabinet Office and the Number 10 Policy Unit. She was a director general at the Department for Business, Innovation and Skills from 2010 until 2015, when she became director general for the Rail Group in the Department for Transport, a post she held until she was appointed permanent secretary for that department on 18 April 2017. Her promotion followed Philip Rutnam's move to the Home Office.

Kelly was appointed Companion of the Order of the Bath (CB) in 2010 and Dame Commander of the Order of the Bath (DCB) in the 2022 Birthday Honours for services to government. She was awarded an honorary doctorate from the University of Hull in 2023.

On 19 March 2025, she announced she would be retiring in the summer after 39 years in the civil service.
