= Clare Venables =

English theatre director

Clare Rosamund Venables (17 March 1943 – 17 October 2003) was an English theatre director. She was artistic director of regional theatres in Lincoln, Stratford East (London), and Sheffield; she became Director of Education at the Royal Shakespeare Company, and she also directed a number of operas.

== Early life ==
She was born in Southend-on-Sea, Essex, to Sir Peter Venables, first vice-chancellor of the University of Aston and a founder of the Open University, and Ethel Howell, an educational psychologist who chaired the Marriage Guidance Council.

She was educated at Manchester High School and Camp Hill School, Birmingham. She then read drama at Manchester University, gaining a first-class degree, and taught there for three years after graduating.

== Career ==
Clare Venables started her career as director at the Theatre Royal in Lincoln in 1968, taking over as artistic director in 1970, with Howard Lloyd-Lewis as her assistant. They both moved on to the Manchester Library Theatre in 1973.

From 1977 to 1980, she was artistic director at the Theatre Royal in Stratford East, London, a high-profile role where she followed Joan Littlewood in the role.

From 1981 to 1992, she was artistic director at the Crucible Theatre in Sheffield, where she had a role in the early careers of Tim Albery, Stephen Daldry and Steven Pimlott.

She was active in the administration of the dramatic arts as a founding director of the Actors' Centre and as a member of the Arts Council drama panel. She was also active throughout her career in teaching: long before taking up her RSC post, she taught at the Royal Academy of Dramatic Art and at the London Academy of Music and Dramatic Art. From 1995 to 1999, she was principal of the BRIT School of Performing Arts and Technology in Croydon.

She was appointed Director of Education at the Royal Shakespeare Company in 1999, a post which she held until her death. In this role she worked on education projects in the United States with the University of Michigan, Columbia University, and Davidson College, and in England with many schools as well as the University of Warwick. One of her last projects was a production of Pericles with the homeless people's theatre company, Cardboard Citizens.

She contributed articles to Theatre Quarterly (1980), Plays and Players (1987) and Changes (1988).

== Personal life ==
On 27 May 1971 she married the actor Robert Whelan; they separated in 1982. Their son, Joe, was born on 6 October 1978.

She died of breast cancer aged 60.
