= William Fearon (priest) =

William Andrewes Fearon (4 February 1841 – 29 April 1924) was an Anglican priest and educationalist.

He was born in Assington, Suffolk, into an ecclesiastical family, the son of Rev. Daniel Rose Fearon, and Francis Jane Andrewes, daughter of Rev. Charles Andrewes. He was educated at Winchester and New College, Oxford, where he was a Fellow from 1864 to 1867 and president of the Oxford Union in 1864. He was ordained deacon in 1867 and priest the following year.

He had a tutor’s house at his old school from 1867 to 1882, during which time he married Mary Freeman, the daughter of an Archdeacon of Exeter when he became Headmaster of Durham School. He was Examining Chaplain to the Bishop of Newcastle from 1882 to 1884 when he returned to Winchester, where he was Headmaster until 1901. After stepping down he was in February 1903 appointed a member of the Teachers′ Registration Council.

He was Archdeacon of Winchester from 1903 to 1920, Examining Chaplain to the Bishop of Winchester from 1903 to 1915; and Canon of Winchester from 1906 until 1920.

Church of England titles
| Preceded by Arthur Temple Lyttelton | Archdeacon of Winchester; 1903–1920 | Succeeded by Alfred Edward Daldy |
Academic offices
| Preceded by George Ridding | Headmaster of Winchester College; 1884–1901 | Succeeded by Hubert Murray Burge |
