= King Edward VI Camp Hill School for Girls =

Location
- Vicarage Road; Kings Heath, Birmingham, West Midlands, B14 7QJ; England; 52.42964°N 1.90289°W

Information
- Type: Grammar school; Academy
- Motto: Dieu Et Mon Droit (God and my right)
- Religious affiliation: Church of England
- Established: 1883
- Founder: King Edward VI Foundation
- Local authority: Birmingham
- Department for Education URN: 137044 Tables
- Ofsted: Reports
- Headteacher: Karen Stevens (2022-)
- Gender: Girls
- Age: 11 to 18
- Enrolment: 950
- Website: www.kechg.org.uk

King Edward VI Camp Hill School for Girls, also known as Camp Hill Girls, is a selective grammar school in Kings Heath, Birmingham, for students aged 11 to 18 (Year 7 to Year 13). It is one of the most academically successful schools in the United Kingdom, currently ranked 11th among state schools. It is one of fourteen schools in Birmingham that are part of the King Edward VI Foundation. It shares a campus with King Edward VI Camp Hill School for Boys and, in 1958, both schools moved from their original location in central Birmingham to Vicarage Road in the Birmingham suburb of Kings Heath. The buildings are connected and some facilities, activities and A-level subjects are shared, but they are separate establishments. The name has been retained from the school's former site at Camp Hill.

== Admission ==
Admission to Camp Hill is based upon success in the 11+ exam along with consideration of proximity to the school. It is also guaranteed that at least 25% of students admitted will be "Pupil Premium Pupils", who are pupils whose families will have received free school meals at some point in the six years before application. Those living outside the catchment are able to attend Camp Hill, but only if they achieve a very high score in the 11+, and the quota for catchment pupils is not filled. This admissions policy replaced the previous one from 2020. Previously, there was no weight attached to proximity, and the quota for Pupil Premium Pupils was 20%.

Entry in year 8 to 11 is also through examination only.

=== Admissions controversy 2020 ===
For the academic year starting in 2020, changes were made to admissions criteria by The Schools of King Edward VI in Birmingham, the body which oversees the running of Camp Hill and the other King Edward schools in Birmingham. These changes were praised by some but were largely controversial, with only 27% of those consulted supporting the plans. The changes increased admissions of Pupil Premium students to 25%, and also largely restricted admissions to the wards immediately surrounding Camp Hill, by means of catchment areas. Previously, applications were open to any UK citizen. In public consultation, many concerns were raised about the catchment areas, including that they may be designed to increase applications to the private schools of KES, overseen by the same body. These concerns were brushed aside by the Schools of King Edward VI, which explained them as affluent parents outside Birmingham being disappointed at their loss of entitlement to a grammar school place. The BBC and others published articles on the changes, but all largely ignored the concerns about the catchment area, focussing instead on the issue of increased admission of deprived pupils, and the perceived class struggle. In a Freedom of Information request to The King Edward Schools, release of the consultation responses, and information regarding reasons for the catchment plans, was refused. A complaint regarding conflicts of interest and concerns raised in the consultation was also brushed aside.

== Curriculum ==
All National Curriculum subjects are studied, and the curriculum is enhanced to provide creative opportunities in drama and dance and support for all aspects of personal development in PSHE. From early on, the sciences are taught separately to support the large number of pupils who choose biology, chemistry and physics as A level options. Teaching groups are of the same age and, generally, of mixed ability. As in all secondary schools, pupils sit most of their GCSE examinations in Year 11, although more flexible pathways enable early entry in some disciplines, for example mathematics. Pupils take ten GCSEs, and four A-levels from Year 12, but can choose to drop one in Year 13.

In addition, success in a variety of fields has been recognised through a number of other awards including a Gold Award for celebrating Cultural Diversity, a Gold Artsmark for the range of arts activities supported by the School, the International Schools Award, a Healthy Schools Award and a Basic 21 Award for encouraging sustainability.

== Houses ==
The house system at Camp Hill allows girls to participate in a range of sporting, cultural and charitable activities, and house points form part of the rewards system. The six house names - Cartland, Lichfield, Meriden, Priory, Stratford and Warwick - are related to the school's history. There are various house events throughout the year such has a house festival, house fair and seasonal house sports competitions. At the end of each academic year, the House Cup is awarded to the house with the most points.

=== KECHG Houses ===
House	Colour
Meriden	Red
Cartland	Green
Warwick	Dark blue
Priory	Yellow
Lichfield	White
Stratford	Sky blue

== Notable alumni ==
- Shabana Mahmood, Home Secretary, and Labour MP since 2010 for Birmingham Ladywood attended the sixth form
- Kate Ashfield, actress who starred in the 2004 film Shaun of the Dead
- Layla Guscoth, Former Head Girl, Doctor and International netball player, debuting in 2012 and Captain of both the Under 17s and Under 21 England Netball squads, and former Captain of both the Mavericks and Thunderbirds. During COVID-19, she returned to the UK to practice medicine at Queen Elizabeth Hospital Birmingham.
- Ruth Hunt, chief executive of Stonewall, a leading UK LGBT equality organisation
- Dame Bernadette Kelly, Permanent Secretary since 2017 at the Department for Transport
- Jess Phillips (née Trainor), Labour MP since 2015 for Birmingham Yardley
- Commodore Carolyn Stait CBE, first female commander of a Royal Navy base (HMNB Clyde from 2004 to 2007), and the first woman to reach the rank of commodore (equivalent to brigadier or air commodore)
- Clare Venables, theatre director; her father Sir Peter Venables was the first vice-chancellor of Aston University
- Salma Yaqoob, leader from 2005 to 2012 of the Respect Party
