= Philip Rutnam =

British civil servant (born 1965)

Sir Philip Rutnam KCB
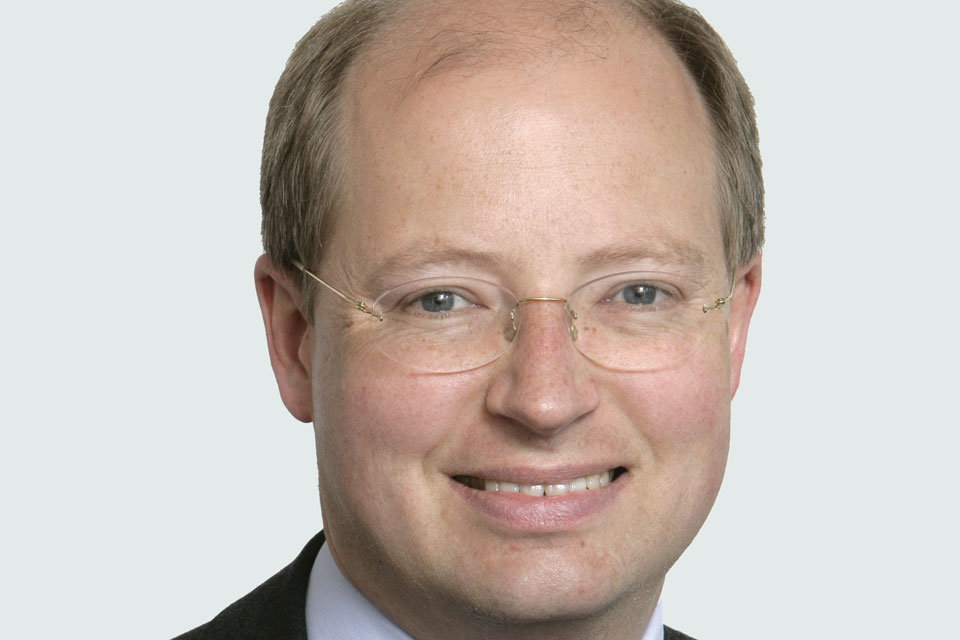
- Philip Rutnam

Permanent Under-Secretary of State at the Home Office
- In office 5 April 2017 – 29 February 2020
- Minister: Amber Rudd; Sajid Javid; Priti Patel
- Preceded by: Mark Sedwill
- Succeeded by: Matthew Rycroft

Permanent Secretary of the Department for Transport
- In office 12 March 2012 – 5 April 2017
- Prime Minister: David Cameron; Theresa May
- Minister: Justine Greening; Patrick McLoughlin; Chris Grayling
- Preceded by: Lin Homer
- Succeeded by: Bernadette Kelly

Personal details
- Born: Philip McDougall Rutnam; 19 June 1965 (age 61) Bromley, Kent, England
- Education: University of Cambridge; Harvard University
- Occupation: Civil servant

Sir Philip McDougall Rutnam, KCB (born 19 June 1965) is a British former civil servant who served as Permanent Under-Secretary of State at the Home Office from 2017 until his resignation on 29 February 2020. Prior to this, he was the Permanent Secretary at the Department for Transport for five years and also Acting Permanent Secretary at the Department for Business, Innovation and Skills in 2010.

Rutnam is currently Chair of the National Churches Trust, the UK's national conservation charity for churches, chapels and meeting houses. He is also Chair of the National Institute of Economic and Social Research and a Council Member of the University of Surrey. He was previously a Non-Executive Director of Oxford Health NHS Foundation Trust, where he chaired the partnership with the University of Oxford to redevelop the Warneford Hospital site as Oxford's new centre for treatment and research linked to brain science and mental health. He is also a Patron of the Independent Transport Commission.

After Rutnam resigned from the Government in February 2020, he began legal action against the Home Office for constructive dismissal, making clear that before his dismissal he had raised serious concerns about Ministerial conduct towards staff. As a consequence of his statement, the Prime Minister asked the Independent Adviser on Ministers' Interests to investigate the conduct of the Home Secretary, Priti Patel, towards staff. The Adviser later found that she had breached the Ministerial Code by bullying staff. The legal action was settled in March 2021 in a settlement worth approximately £376,000 including a contribution to Rutnam's legal costs of £30,000.

== Early life and education ==
Born in Bromley, Rutnam was educated at Dulwich College Preparatory School, Dulwich College, Trinity Hall, Cambridge, and Harvard University where he was a Kennedy Scholar

== Career ==
Rutnam joined the Civil Service in 1987 where he held posts at the Treasury. He also worked for Morgan Stanley in Hong Kong and later joined Ofcom where he helped build the organisation from inception and was Partner, Competition and Regulation and a member of the Board. He joined the Department for Business, Innovation and Skills as Director General and a board member in 2009.

=== Department for Transport ===
Rutnam became Permanent Secretary at the Department for Transport in April 2012 with the Secretary of State, Justine Greening, commenting that his "outstanding record and business focused skillset will be tremendous assets". As of 2015, Rutnam was paid a salary of between £170,000 and £174,999, making him one of the 328 most highly paid people in the British public sector at that time.

He oversaw the development of the Hybrid Bill for HS2, the creation of Highways England, a review of airport policy, a substantial completion of works on Thameslink, a new approach to rail franchising after the failure of the West Coast procurement begun in 2010, and a reset of the £61 billion Network Rail improvement plan from 2012.

=== Disability Champion ===
From 2015 to 2020 he was Disability Champion for the Civil Service.

=== Home Office ===
On 27 February 2017, it was announced that Rutnam would replace Mark Sedwill as Permanent Secretary at the Home Office. with the Cabinet Secretary, Jeremy Heywood, noting his “strong track record of leadership and achievement”. Rutnam took up the post in April 2017. He oversaw the Home Office response to the Grenfell Tower Fire, and to the Windrush Scandal, and to the series of terrorist attacks between 2017 and 2018, as well as the rollout of the European Union Settlement Scheme and preparations for Brexit.

Following the Windrush Scandal he said he deeply regretted not identifying this as a systemic issue and that the department had not understood enough about the population affected. On 29 April 2018 Amber Rudd resigned as Home Secretary after she had claimed incorrectly that she had never been aware that there were targets for immigration removals.

Rutnam was appointed a Knight Commander of the Order of the Bath in the 2018 New Year Honours for public service.

=== Resignation ===
On 29 February 2020 Rutnam announced his resignation, stating publicly that he would sue the Government for constructive dismissal following a "vicious and orchestrated campaign" against him after he had raised concerns about Ministerial conduct. In his statement he said: “One of my duties as Permanent Secretary was to protect the health, safety and wellbeing of our 35,000 people. This created tension with the Home Secretary, and I have encouraged her to change her behaviours. This has been a very difficult decision but I hope that my stand may help in maintaining the quality of government in our country, which includes hundreds of thousands of civil servants loyally dedicated to delivering this government’s agenda”.

Sir Mark Sedwill wrote in his official response that he regretted his decision, saying that he was "grateful for your devoted public service and excellent contribution over the course of your long and distinguished career in the Civil Service...you have ever been mindful of the Civil Service values, demonstrated in the way you have conducted yourself in your roles.”.

The General Secretary of the FDA, Dave Penman, commented on Rutnam's "brave and principled decision to resign".

A report by Sir Alex Allan, the Prime Minister's Independent Advisor on Ministerial Standards, later concluded that Priti Patel's approach "amounted to behaviour that can be described as bullying" and that she had "not consistently met the high standards expected of her".

On 4 March 2021, the Government announced that it had settled Rutnam's legal claims. It later confirmed that the value of the settlement was approximately £376,000, and that the claims settled had included making protected disclosures under whistleblowing laws and/or health and safety law.

Government offices
Preceded by Mark Sedwill	Permanent Under-Secretary of State at the Home Office; 2017–2020	Succeeded by Matthew Rycroft
Preceded by Lin Homer	Permanent Secretary at the Department for Transport; 2012–2017	Succeeded by Bernadette Kelly
