= Alfred Daldy =

The Ven Alfred Edward Daldy, MA (24 June 1865 – 29 October 1935) was Archdeacon of Winchester from 1920 until his death.

Daldy was educated at Cranbrook School, Kent and the University of Cambridge. He was ordained deacon in 1888; and priest in 1889. After curacies at St Mary Bromley and All Hallows-by-the-Tower he was Winchester Diocesan Missioner from 1897 to 1904; Vicar of St Peter, Bournemouth from 1904 to 1920; and Master of St Cross Hospital, Winchester from 1928.

== Notes ==
Church of England titles
Preceded by William Andrewes Fearon	Archdeacon of Winchester; 1920–1935	Succeeded by Edmund Robert Morgan
