= National Churches Trust =

British charity

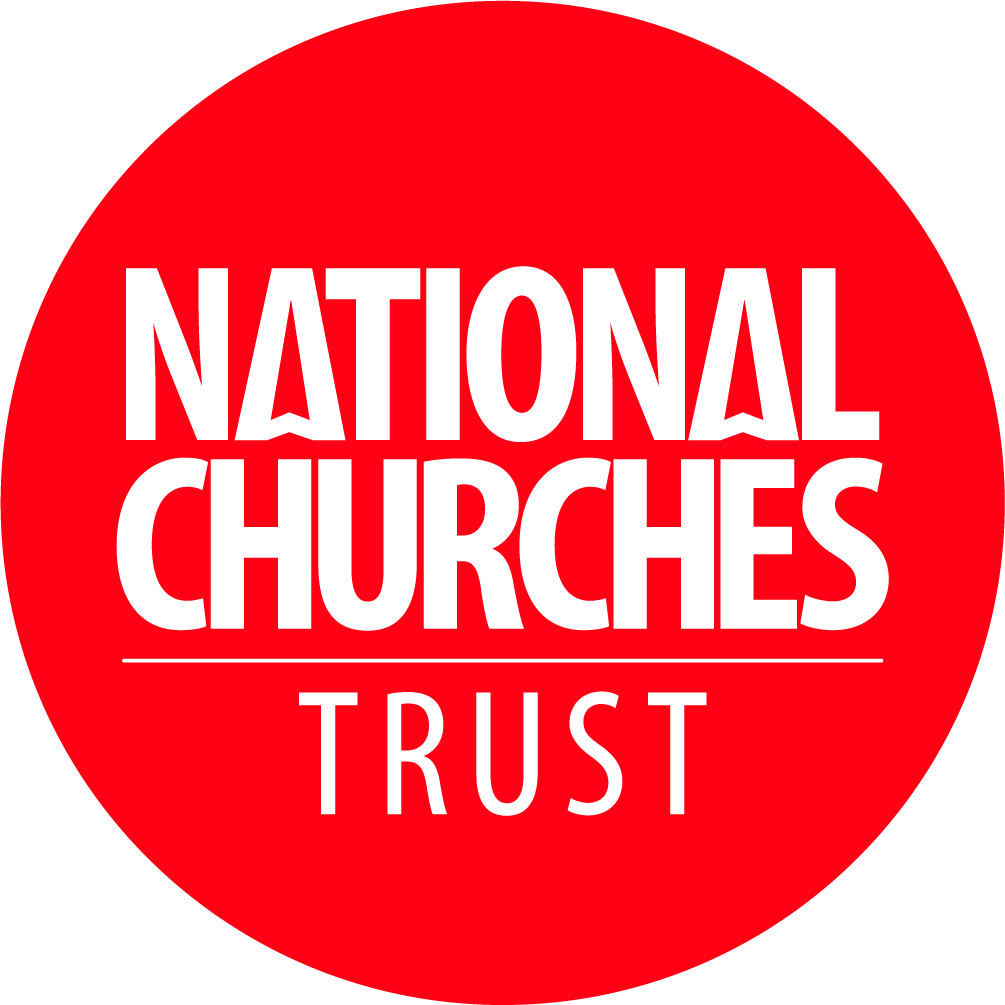
- Predecessor: Historic Churches Preservation Trust (1953); Incorporated Church Building Society (1818)
- Formation: 2007
- Purpose: To promote and support church buildings of historic, architectural and community value across the UK
- Headquarters: Faith House
- Location: 7 Tufton Street, Westminster, London SW1P 3QB
- Chief Executive: Claire Walker
- Chair: Sir Philip Rutnam
- Website: nationalchurchestrust.org
- Formerly called: Historic Churches Preservation Trust

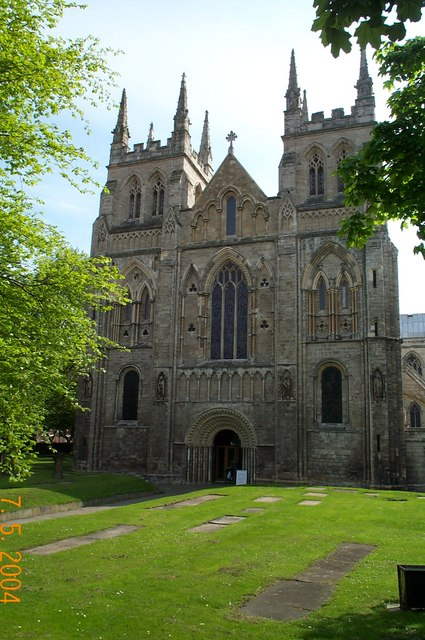
Selby Abbey in North Yorkshire, one of the churches benefitting from the charity

The National Churches Trust, formerly the Historic Churches Preservation Trust, is a British registered charity whose aim is to "promote and support church buildings of historic, architectural and community value across the UK".

It carries out this aim by providing financial grants to repair and modernise church buildings, supporting projects to enable churches to remain open, collaborating with local Churches Trusts and volunteer bodies, providing practical advice, support and information, and working to promote public awareness of the needs of churches. Its forerunner was the Historic Churches Preservation Trust, whose functions it has taken over, together with those of the Incorporated Church Building Society.

== History ==
By the middle of the 20th century, the fabric of many British church buildings was in a poor state of repair. This had followed socioeconomic changes in the late 19th and early 20th centuries, including population changes, followed by neglect during the Second World War. Matters came to a head in 1950 with public statements, including an editorial in The Times. About this time the Pilgrim Trust declared that it was ceasing to give grants for repairs to individual churches. The Church of England's Church Assembly (now the General Synod of the Church of England) established the Repair of Churches Commission to decide what should be done about the problem. This resulted in the creation of the Historic Churches Preservation Trust, which was registered as a charity in 1953. Its first Secretary and Executive Committee Chairman was Ivor Bulmer-Thomas, a Conservative politician, the role of Secretary being taken over later in 1953 by Hugh Llewellyn Jones. In order to ensure that the grants it gave were appropriate, local advisory panels of architects were established, later replaced by the Committee of Honorary Consultant Architects, who continued to advise the Trust until 2002. At the time of its foundation, it was estimated that a total of £4 million was necessary to fulfil its aims. Money was raised in a variety of ways, including appeals on radio and television, exhibitions, concerts, individual and corporate donations, and a benefit dinner. Support was received from charitable trusts, including the Pilgrim Trust, the Dulverton Trust, the Manifold Trust, and the Esmée Fairbairn Foundation.

From the time of its creation, the Trust gave grants for the repair of both active and redundant churches, although the care of redundant churches was strictly beyond its remit. In 1960 the Bridges Commission recommended that "a new fund be set up under a new Pastoral Measure to preserve churches of acknowledged historic or architectural worth". The Pastoral Measure of 1968 led to the creation of the Redundant Churches Fund (later the Churches Conservation Trust), which provided money from both the Church of England and the State for the preservation of redundant churches.

It took until 1984 to raise the first £4 million. After that the size of donations tended to be larger. and by the end of 2005 a total of over £27 million had been raised. In 2000 alone over £2.2 million was received. The size of grants made to churches has varied greatly. Up to 2005 the smallest grant had been £33 4s 4d to a church in Mileham, Norfolk, in 1957, and the largest grants were of £100,000 each to a church in Portsea, Portsmouth, Hampshire, in 2000, and to Selby Abbey in 2005. The criterion for the award of a grant was "for essential repairs to any place of worship (with the exception of cathedrals) over 100 years old which is of a recognized Christian denomination and is open for public worship". Initially available only to churches in England, the scheme was extended to churches and chapels in Wales in 1987. The decision to award a grant is made by the Trust's Grants committee. Some of the churches that have been helped are now closed and have been declared redundant. These are now cared for by the Churches Conservation Trust. In 1983 the Historic Churches Preservation Trust took over the management of the Incorporated Church Building Society. This had been founded in 1818 to assist Anglican churches of any age, sometimes giving grants for new churches. In the early 1990s a Friends' scheme was instituted. In 2006 the Trust took over the functions of the Open Churches Trust. The Historic Churches Preservation Trust was succeeded by the National Churches Trust in 2007.

A government scheme, The Listed Places of Worship Grant Scheme, also assists in essential work to listed religious buildings, giving grants of £346 million from 2010 to 2023, mainly to cover the VAT on repairs.

== Activities ==
The National Churches Trust is a registered charity. The full definition of its objectives and activities are "to promote the conservation, repair, maintenance, improvement, and reconstruction of churches (to mean any recognised Christian places of worship, chapel or meeting house in the UK), and of such monuments, fittings, stained glass, furniture, organs, bells, in such churches and to promote the building, development of churches in the United Kingdom". In the year ending 31 December 2009 its income was £1,895,258, of which 87.4% came from voluntary sources, and it spent £2,712,564, of which 89.4% was used for its charitable activities. It employed eight people. The Trust is managed by a board of Trustees, and decisions to award grants are decided by the Grants Committee. Grants of £10,000 and above are made for urgent structural repairs, and grants of between £5,000 and £25,000 are made towards the installation of facilities for such functions as toilets and catering. Since 2005, the Trust has distributed over £9 million to over 1,000 churches. It supports church buildings of any denomination that are members of Churches Together in Britain and Ireland, and covers the whole of the United Kingdom. It does not own churches, and does not support redundant churches. It receives no funding from the Government or from church authorities. Its income is derived from individual donations, and from parishes, Trusts and Foundations, and from investment income. As of 2011 the Trust is not contributing towards the building of new places of worship. The Trust works in conjunction with a network of Local Churches Trusts that cover most of the country. Members of the public can become a Friend of the National Churches Trust.

In July 2017 the trust launched an online competition, Sacred Wales – Cymru Sanctaidd, to find the favourite church or chapel in Wales from a list of 50 buildings suggested by religious and heritage organisations. The competition was devised to "celebrate and raise awareness of Wales’ religious heritage".

== Governance ==
- Patron: King Charles III
- Vice Patron: Prince Richard, Duke of Gloucester
- Presidents: Vacant, Archbishop of Canterbury and Stephen Cottrell, Archbishop of York
- Vice Presidents:

Sarah Bracher MBE; Bill Bryson OBE HonFRS; Dame Liz Forgan DBE; Dr Jenny Freeman OBE; Professor Alan Gillett OBE FRICS; Bryan Grey CBE DL; Edward Harley CBE	Lady Harman; Michael Hoare; Rt Rev Nicholas Holtam, Bishop of Salisbury; Dr Bettany Hughes; Rt Rev Rosemarie Mallett; Lady Nutting OBE; Dr Rory O'Donnell FSA; Jeremy O'Sullivan	Eric Parry; Sir Michael Palin CBE; Prince Nicholas of Prussia; Rev Canon Roger Royle; Most Rev George Stack, Archbishop of Cardiff; Very Rev Henry Stapleton MBE; Richard Taylor; Luke March DL

=== Trustees and officers ===
- Chief Executive: Claire Walker
- Chairman, Board of Trustees: Sir Philip Rutnam
- Chairman, Grants Committee: Nigel Walter

== King of Prussia Gold Medal ==
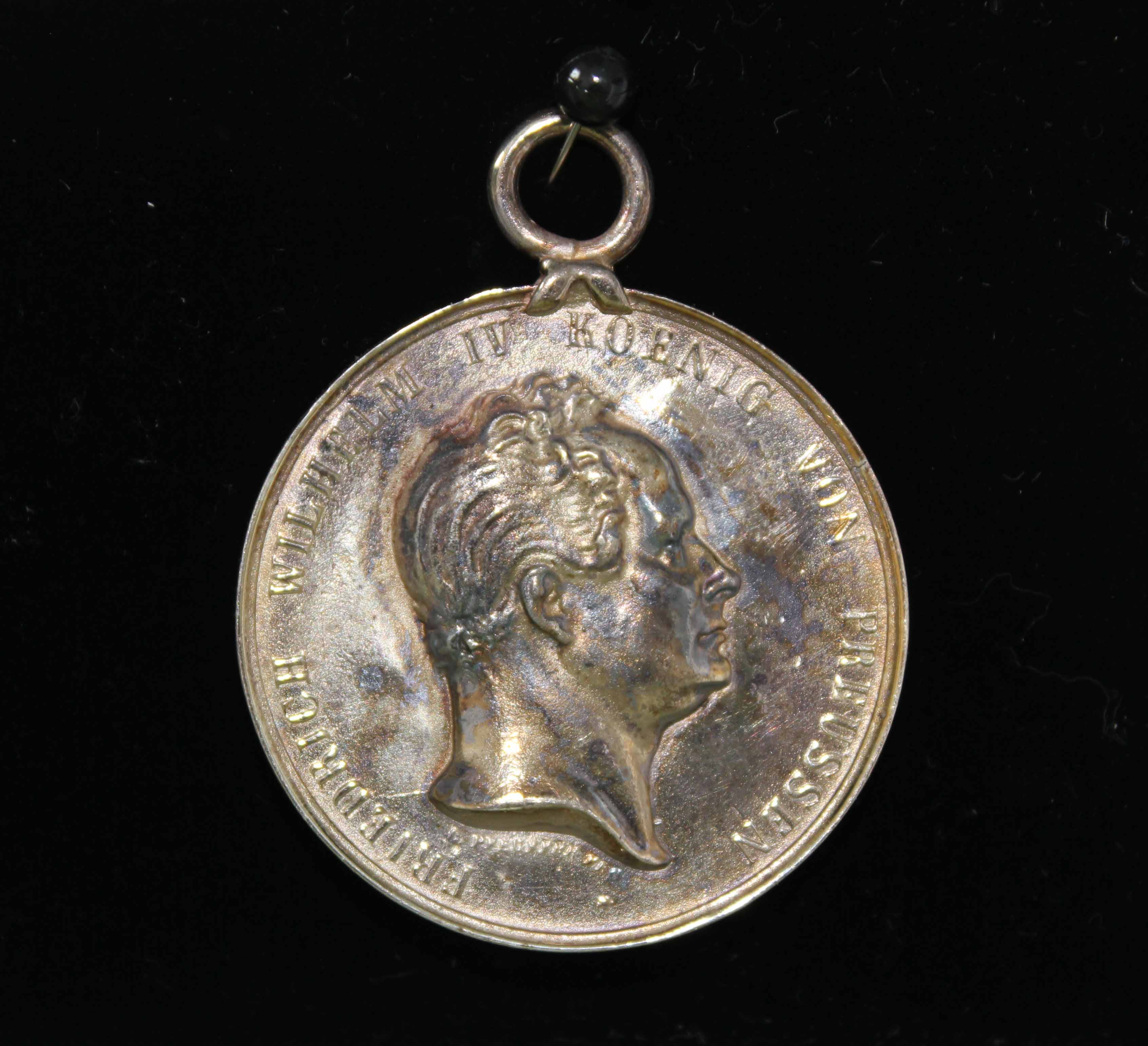
The King of Prussia Gold Medal

The King of Prussia Gold Medal for Church Architecture is awarded by the National Churches Trust for innovative, high quality repair. It was the gift of King Friedrich Wilhelm IV of Prussia (1795–1861) to the Incorporated Church Building Society in 1857. The award has been made annually since the early 1980s, when the medal was re-discovered during an office move. The medal is held for one year and afterwards a silver replica is provided. The work of the Incorporated Church Building Society is now administered by the National Churches Trust.

== Presidents' Award ==
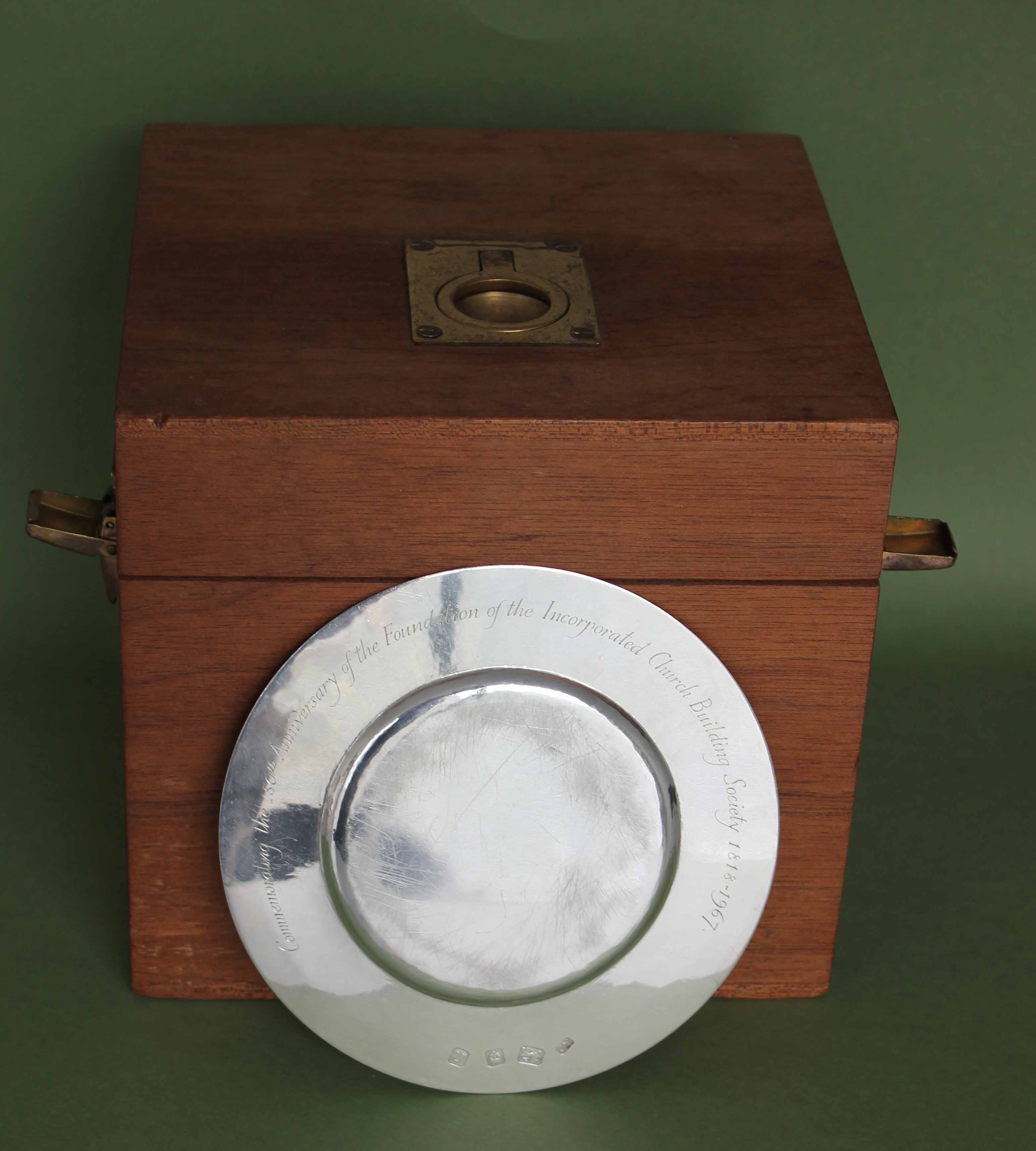
The Presidents' Award paten

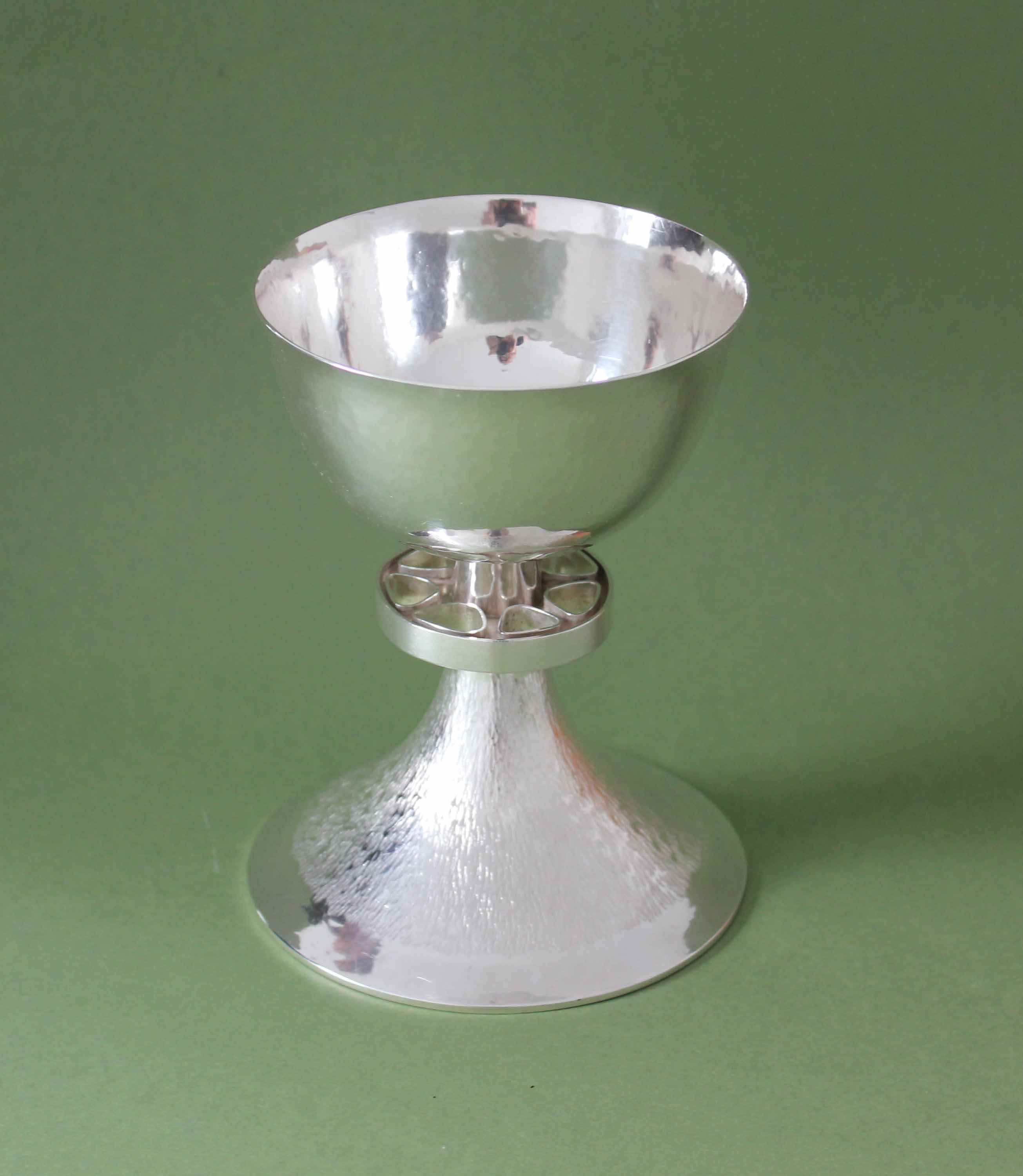
The Presidents' Award chalice

The Presidents' Award for church architecture dates from 1999 and is presented on behalf of the Presidents of the Ecclesiastical Architects and Surveyors Association and the National Churches Trust. The award comprises a chalice and paten, originally commissioned by the Incorporated Church Building Society, and made after the Second World War, to be loaned to a new or seriously war-damaged church. They are lent to the winning parish to be held by them for the next year.

== See also ==
- Churches Conservation Trust, a Church of England charity protecting historic churches at risk in England
