= Balleine =

Balleine is a surname. Notable people with the surname include:

- George Orange Balleine (1842–1906), Dean of Jersey
- George Reginald Balleine (1873–1966), British historian and writer
