= George Balleine =

George Balleine can refer to:

- George Orange Balleine (1842–1906), Dean of Jersey
- George Reginald Balleine (1873–1966), historian
