= Admiral Inglis =

Admiral Inglis may refer to:

- Charles Inglis (Royal Navy officer, died 1791) (c. 1731–1791), British Royal Navy rear admiral
- John Inglis (Royal Navy officer) (1743–1807), British Royal Navy vice admiral
- John Gilchrist Inglis (1906–1972), British Royal Navy vice admiral

== See also ==
- Charles Ingles (1869–1954), British Royal Navy Chaplain of the Fleet (equivalent to admiral rank)
