= Basil O'Ferrall =

The Venerable Basil O'Ferrall CB QHC

Personal details
- Born: August 24, 1924
- Died: June 23, 2006 (aged 81)
- Denomination: Anglician

Basil Arthur O’Ferrall CB QHC (24 August 1924 – 23 June 2006) was an Anglican priest in the second half of the 20th century.

He was born on 24 August 1924 and educated at St Patrick's Cathedral Grammar School, Dublin and Trinity College in the same city. He was ordained in 1948 and began his ecclesiastical career with a curacy at St Patrick's, Coleraine after which he became a naval chaplain. He served on amongst others HMS Victory, HMS Ganges, HMS Adamant and HMS Victorious before becoming Chaplain of the Fleet and Archdeacon of the Royal Navy, a post he held from 1975 to 1980. An Honorary Chaplain to the Queen, he was Vicar of Ranworth with Woodbastwick before becoming Dean of Jersey in 1985. He retired in 1993; and died on 23 June 2006.

== Notes and references ==
Church of England titles
| Preceded by Chandos Clifford Hastings Mansel Morgan | Chaplain of the Fleet; 1975 –1980 | Succeeded by Raymond Harcourt Roberts |
| Preceded by Thomas Ashworth Goss | Dean of Jersey; 1985–1993 | Succeeded by John Nicholas Shtetinin Seaford |
