= Syvret =

Syvret (also "Syfret" or "Sivret") is a surname from Jersey. According to Rev George Reginald Balleine, it was either a French form of Seffrid, or of the Latin Severiacus. It possibly derived from an Old Scandinavian name "Sige-raed", meaning "victory-counsel".

Notable people with this surname include:

- Edward Neville Syfret (1889-1972), British admiral
- Danny Syvret (born 1985), Canadian ice hockey player
- Dave Syvret (born 1954), Canadian ice hockey player
- Sheila Syvret, lawn bowler
- Stuart Syvret, political activist from Jersey
