= Michael Henley =

Anglican bishop (1939–2014)

The Right Reverend Michael Henley CB
- Bishop of St Andrews, Dunkeld and Dunblane
- Church: Scottish Episcopal Church
- Diocese: Diocese of St Andrews, Dunkeld and Dunblane
- In office: 1994 to 2004

Orders
- Consecration: 4 March 1994

Personal details
- Born: Michael Harry George Henley; 16 January 1939
- Died: 21 March 2014 (aged 75)
- Denomination: Anglicanism

Michael Harry George Henley, CB (16 January 1939 – 21 March 2014) was an Anglican bishop. He was a chaplain of the Royal Navy and the Bishop of St Andrews, Dunkeld and Dunblane.

== Early life and education ==
Henley was born on 16 January 1938. He was educated at St Marylebone Grammar School and the London College of Divinity.

== Ordained ministry ==
=== Early ministry ===
He was ordained deacon in 1961, priest in 1963 and began his ordained ministry as a curate at St Marylebone Parish Church.

=== Chaplaincy service ===
He was a chaplain in the Royal Navy from 1964 to 1969 and then a chaplain to Anglican students of St Andrews University from 1969 to 1972 and of the Royal Hospital School from 1972 to 1974. He returned to the navy in 1972, becoming its Chaplain of the Fleet and Archdeacon for the Royal Navy from 1989 to 1994, during which period he was also appointed honorary Canon of Gibraltar Cathedral. From 1992 to 1994, he served as Director-General to Naval Chaplaincy Services.

=== Later ministry ===
He was then the priest in charge of Holy Trinity, Pitlochry from 1994 to 1996 before his ordination to the episcopate on 4 March 1995. Until 2013, he was also the honorary chaplain of The Royal and Ancient Golf Club of St Andrews.

== Honours ==
He was appointed Companion of the Order of the Bath (CB). He was an Honorary Chaplain to the Queen (QHC) from 1989 to 1994, he retired in 2004.

Military offices
Preceded by Noël Jones	Chaplain of the Fleet; 1989–1994	Succeeded by Michael Bucks
Scottish Episcopal Church titles
Preceded by Michael Hare Duke	Bishop of St Andrews, Dunkeld and Dunblane; 1996–2004	Succeeded by David Chillingworth
