= Le Marinel =

Le Marinel is a surname. It may refer to:

- Georges Le Marinel (1860–1914), Belgian soldier, engineer, explorer and colonial administrator
- Matthew Le Marinel (1883–1963), Jersey Anglican clergyman, who became Dean of Jersey
- Paul Le Marinel (1858–1912), officer in the Belgian army who became an explorer and administrator in the Congo Free State
