= John Armstrong (bishop of Bermuda) =

The Right Reverend John Armstrong CB OBE
- Bishop of Bermuda
- Armstrong in the c1960s.
- In office: 1963–1970
- Other posts: Chaplain of the Fleet, Royal Navy (1960–1963)

Orders
- Ordination: 1932 (deacon); 1933 (priest)
- Consecration: 25 March 1963 by Michael Ramsey

Personal details
- Born: 4 October 1905
- Died: 30 December 1992 (aged 87)
- Education: Durham School; Australian College of Theology

John Armstrong CB OBE (4 October 1905 – 30 December 1992) was an Anglican bishop. He was the fourth Bishop of Bermuda.

== Early life and education ==
He was educated at Durham School, then an all-boys Private school in Durham, County Durham, England. He trained for ordination at St Francis College, a theological college in Nundah, Queensland, and completed a Licentiate in Theology (ThL) at the Australian College of Theology.

== Ordained ministry ==
Armstrong was ordained as a deacon in 1932 (in the Diocese of Goulburn, Australia) and as a priest in 1933. He was a naval chaplain in the Royal Navy for 28 years. He eventually rose to be Chaplain of the Fleet, serving from 1960 to 1963. He retired from the Royal Navy on 15 March 1963.

In 1963, Armstrong was appointed to the episcopate; he was the first Chaplain of the Fleet to proceed directly to the episcopate after leaving office. On 25 March 1963, he was consecrated a bishop by Michael Ramsey, Archbishop of Canterbury, during a service at Westminster Abbey.

Church of England titles
Preceded by Darrell Bunt	Chaplain of the Fleet; 1960–1963	Succeeded by Raymond Richardson
Preceded by Anthony Williams	Bishop of Bermuda; 1963–1970	Succeeded by Eric Trapp
