= Francis Jeune =

British clergyman, schoolmaster and academic

The Right Reverend Francis Jeune
- Bishop of Peterborough
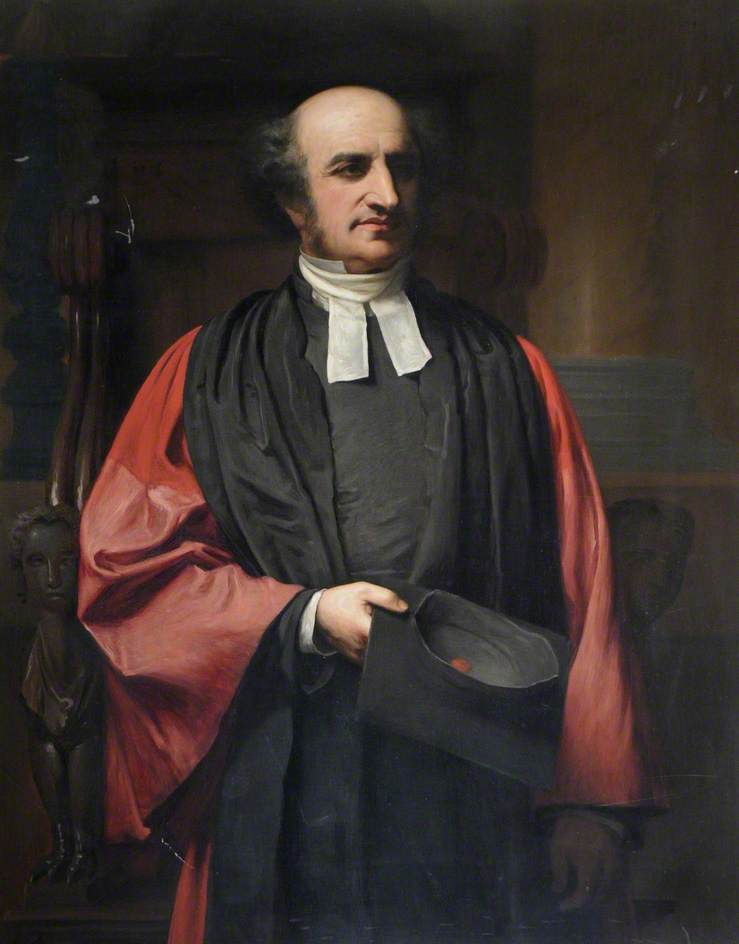
- Diocese: Peterborough
- In office: 1864–1868
- Predecessor: George Davys
- Successor: William Connor Magee
- Other posts: Dean of Jersey (1838–1844); Dean of Lincoln (1864)

Personal details
- Born: 22 May 1806 Saint Aubin, Jersey
- Died: 21 August 1868 (aged 62) Whitby
- Buried: Peterborough Cathedral
- Denomination: Anglican
- Spouse: Margaret Dyne Symons (m. 1836)
- Children: Francis Jeune, 1st Baron St Helier
- Education: Pembroke College, Oxford

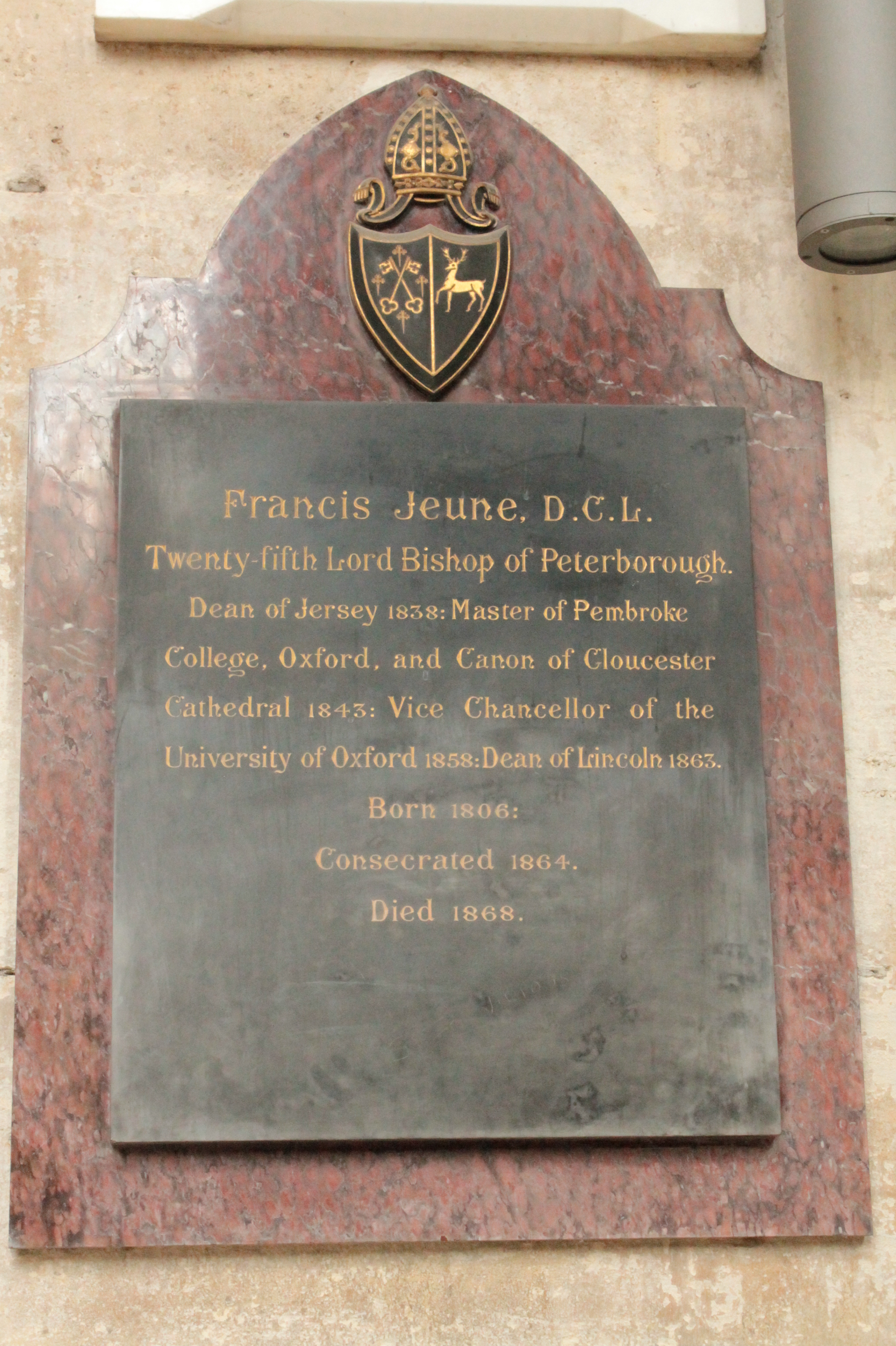
Monument to Bishop Francis Jeune, Peterborough Cathedral

Francis Jeune (22 May 1806 – 21 August 1868), also known as François Jeune, was a Jersey-born clergyman, schoolmaster, and academic who served as Dean of Jersey (1838–1844) Master of Pembroke College, Oxford (1844–1864), and Bishop of Peterborough (1864–1868).

== Life ==
Born at Saint Aubin, Jersey and educated at Rennes, Jeune proceeded to Pembroke College, Oxford as a scholar in 1822, graduating BA in 1827 (MA in 1830), BCL and DCL in 1834. He was a Fellow of Pembroke 1830–1837.

In 1832 Jeune travelled to Canada as secretary to Sir John Colborne, the Lieutenant Governor of Upper Canada (and subsequently Commander-in-Chief of the Canadian forces and Governor General of Canada), and as tutor to Colborne's sons.

Jeune was Head Master of King Edward's School, Birmingham from 1835 to 1838, rebuilding the school buildings and reforming the curriculum. Since 1951 Jeune House has been named after him, competing in the school's annual Cock House Championship.

In 1838 Jeune was appointed Dean of Jersey and Rector of the Parish Church of St Helier. He participated actively in the founding of Victoria College, Jersey.

Jeune returned to Oxford as Master of Pembroke College in 1844. He was instrumental in academic reforms at Oxford, and from 1850 served on the seven-man Royal Committee of Inquiry into the state of Oxford and its colleges, the committee's report leading to the reforming Oxford University Act 1854. He was Vice-Chancellor of Oxford University from 1858 to 1862.

Appointed Dean of Lincoln in January 1864, Jeune soon vacated that office when appointed Bishop of Peterborough. Jeune was consecrated as bishop on St Peter's Day 1864, by Charles Longley, Archbishop of Canterbury at Canterbury Cathedral.

He died on 21 August 1868. A monument to his memory was erected on a column at the east end of Peterborough Cathedral.

== Family ==
His son Francis Henry Jeune became Baron St Hélier.

His daughter Margaret married Edwin Gifford.

== See also ==
Boase, G. C. (1892). "Jeune, Francis". In Lee, Sidney (ed.). Dictionary of National Biography. Vol. 29. London: Smith, Elder & Co.

Academic offices
Preceded by George Hall	Master of Pembroke College, Oxford; 1844–1864	Succeeded by Evan Evans
Preceded by David Williams	Vice-Chancellor of Oxford University; 1858–1862	Succeeded by John Prideaux Lightfoot
Church of England titles
Preceded by Corbet Hue	Dean of Jersey; 1838–1844	Succeeded by William Le Breton
Preceded by Thomas Garnier	Dean of Lincoln; 1864	Succeeded by James Jeremie
Preceded by George Davys	Bishop of Peterborough; 1864–1868	Succeeded by William Connor Magee
