= Parish Church of St Helier =

Church in the parish of Saint Helier, Jersey

Coordinates: 49°11′0.57″N 2°6′24.33″W

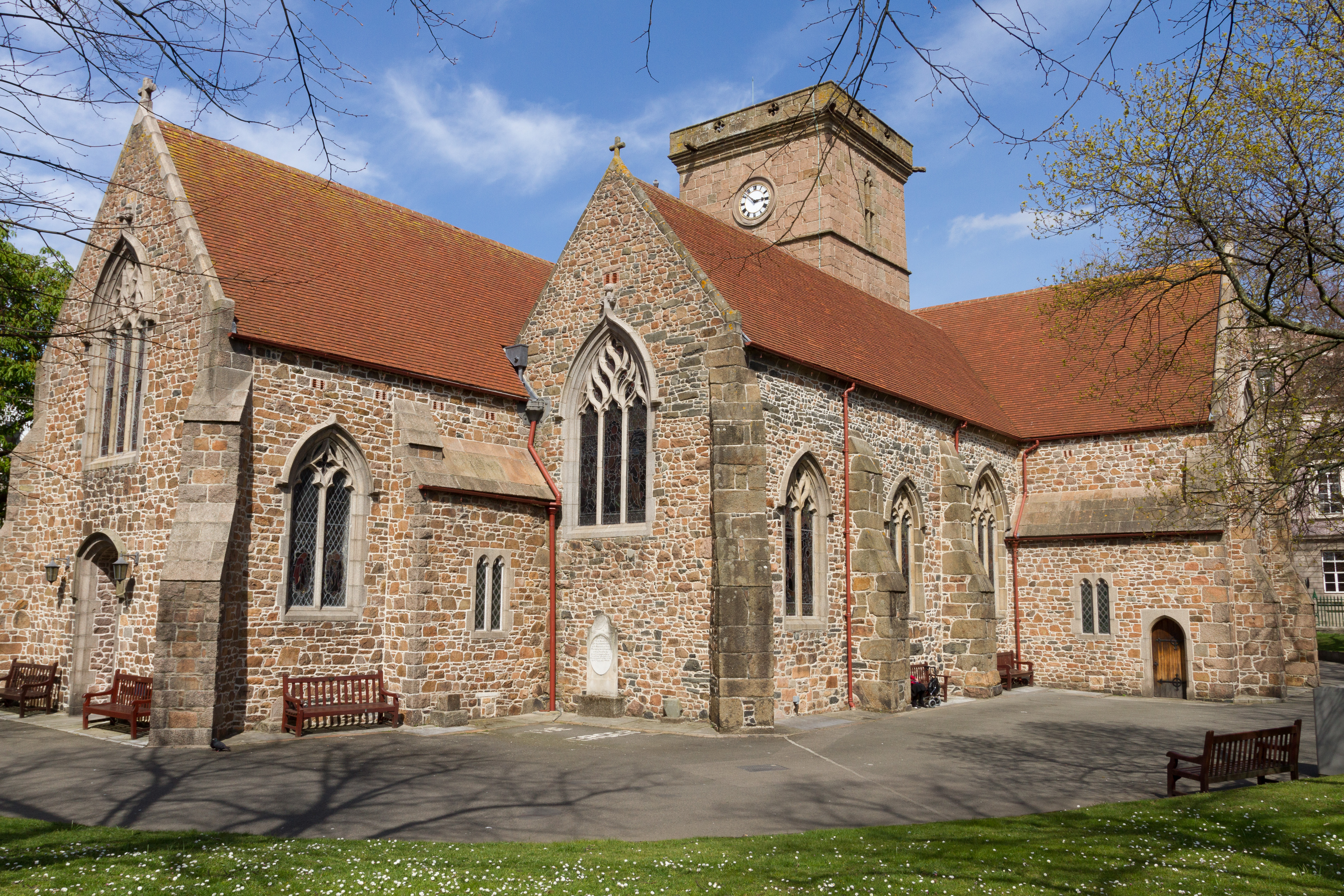
The church from the south side

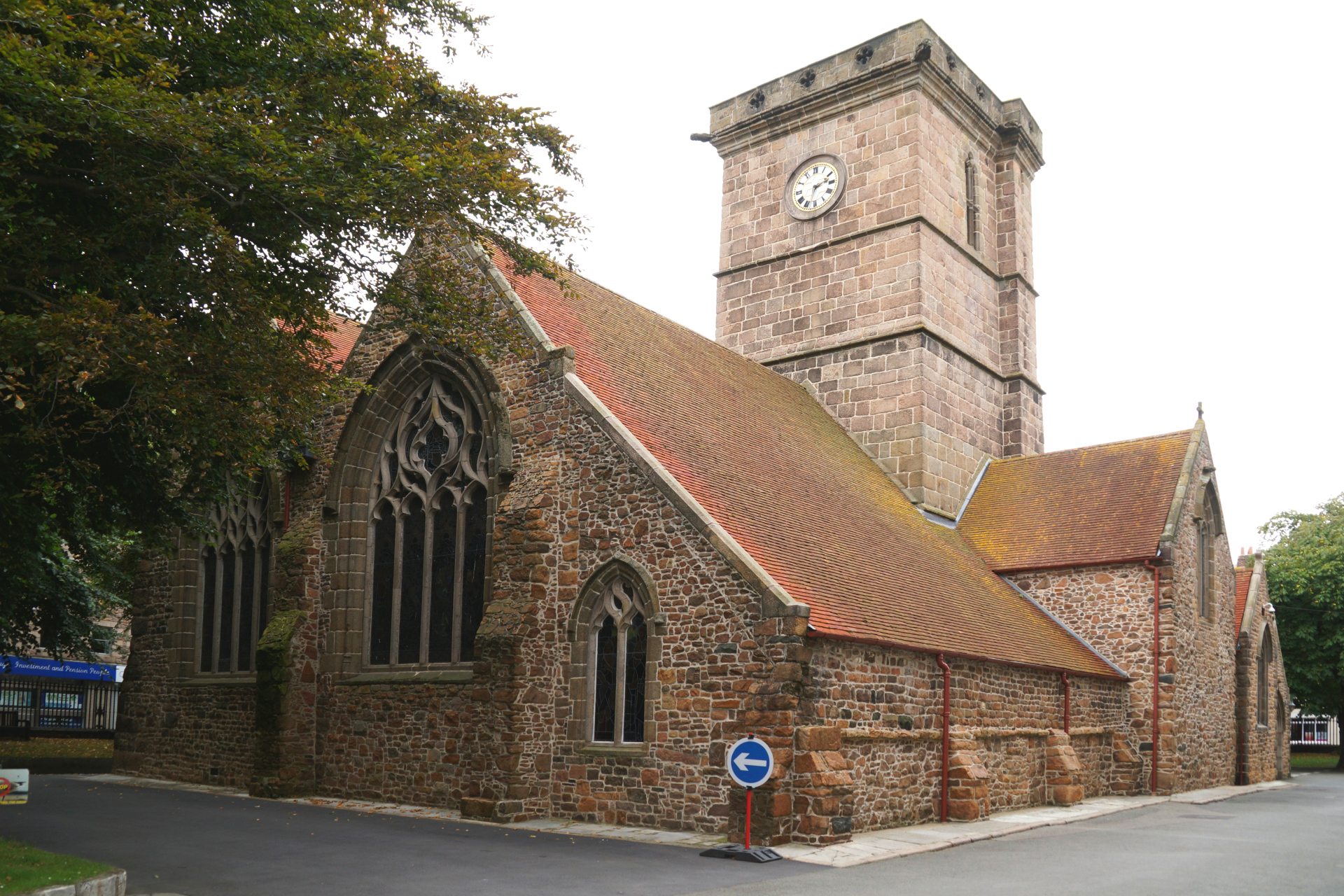
The church from the north side

The Parish Church of St Helier is the parish church of the parish of Saint Helier, Jersey. It is a Church of England church, one of the twelve 'Ancient Parish Churches' of Jersey, and serves as the Island's civic church and Pro-Cathedral.

== History ==
=== Dedication ===
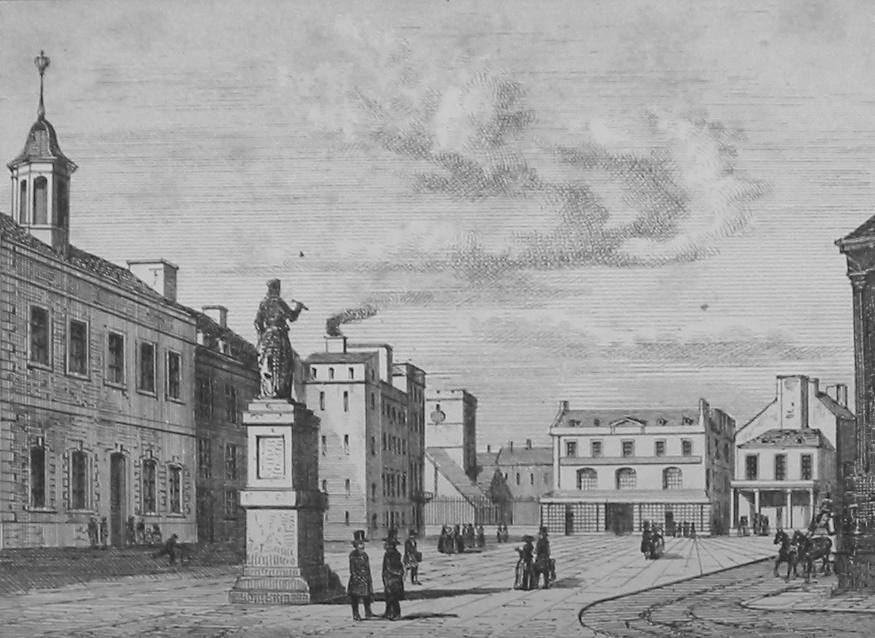
In this 19th-century view across the Royal Square, the Parish Church can be seen in the centre background

Helier was a Belgian saint who lived as a hermit for some ten years on an islet in St Aubin's Bay, about three-quarters of a mile off the south coast of Jersey. In AD 555 he was martyred by Saxon pirates, beheaded by their leader who feared his men would be converted by Helier's preaching. In consequence Helier soon came to be venerated by the Islanders, and eventually was adopted as the Patron Saint of both Jersey and its capital.

=== Establishment of the parish church ===
Although the church is some way inland today, this is a result of land reclamation, and it once lay on the shore – indeed, the church used to have iron rings set into the wall to tie up boats. The site of the church would have been the closest accessible location on dry land to the site of Helier's martyrdom. It is believed that a chapel was erected on the site of the present building very shortly after Helier's death, but the present church was begun in the 11th century. The earliest record is in a document regarding the payment of tithes signed by Duke William II of Normandy, which – because William signed himself Duke rather than King – is assumed to pre-date the Norman Conquest of 1066. All that is visible of the 11th century structure are the remains of window arches on either side of the Choir. The building was reconsecrated in 1341 for unknown reasons.

=== Development of the building ===
The church building was extended to roughly its present size by the end of the 12th century, but most of that building is also lost. The sections of wall flanking the East Window, part of a pier on the north east side of the crossing, the west face of the North Door and the adjoining section to the west, and a small section of wall opposite are all that remain of the building period of roughly 1175 to 1200. The porch attached to the North Door and the greater part of the nave and crossing were built in the second quarter of the 15th century. The date of the chancel is now more or less impossible to determine, since the original walls have been obliterated by the North Chapel on the one side (built in the last quarter of the 13th century, originally the Mortuary Chapel) and the South Chapel (last quarter of the 15th century, commonly but erroneously known as the Lady Chapel) on the other. Most of the north transept dates to the second quarter of the 13th century. The present south transept, vestry, and the westwards extension to the nave (now converted into a narthex) all post-date c. 1820, and are largely Victorian. A major renovation and re-ordering of the church began in 2007, and will take several years.

=== Changes in the ordering of the church ===
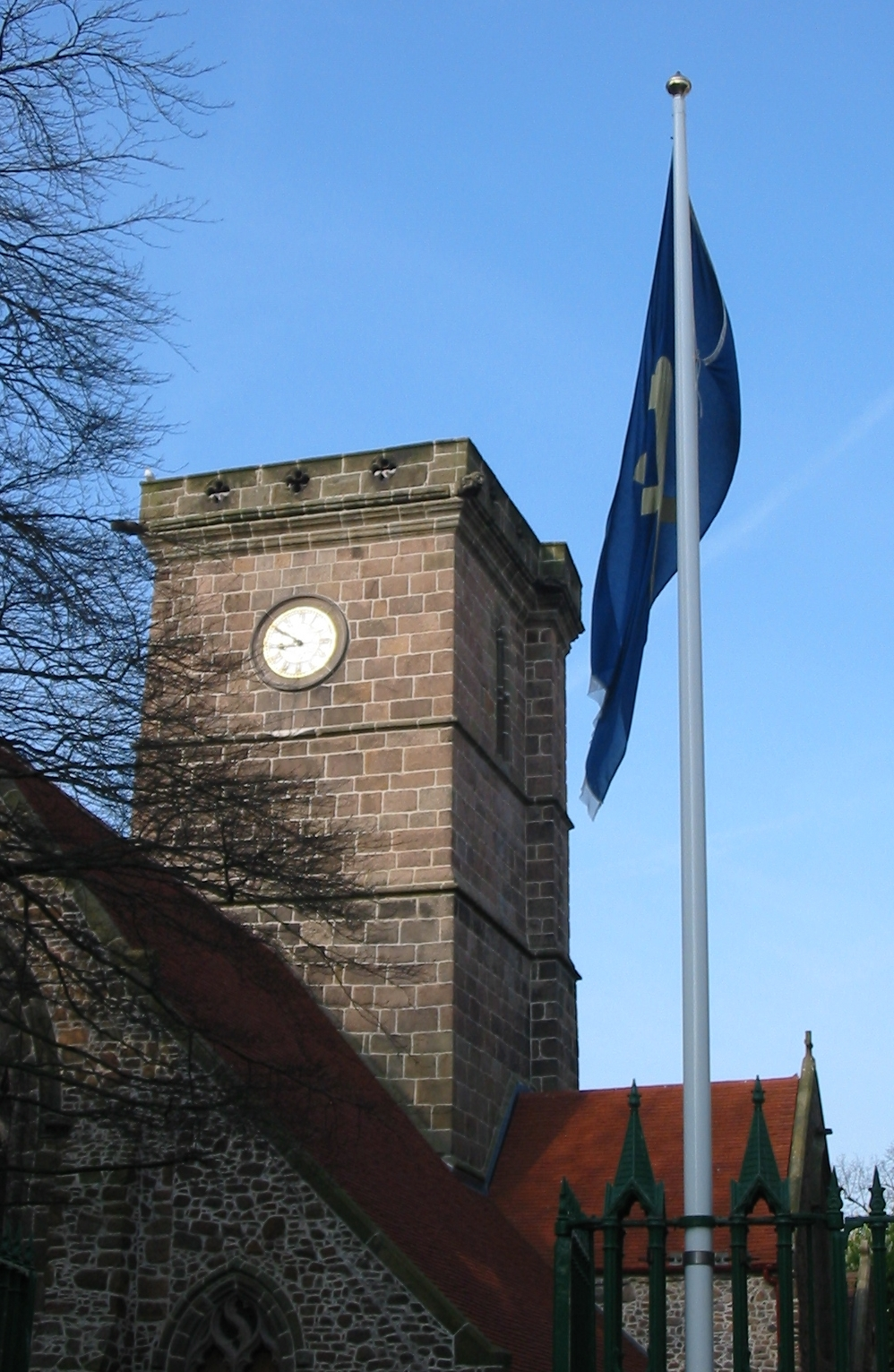
The tower

Until 1548 the interior of the building would have resembled the interior of any medieval church, with a rood screen separating the chancel from the nave (projections to support the screen can still be seen on the piers either side of the nave on the west side of the crossing). It is not known if there were ever wall paintings, but successive generations of plaster and whitewash over the last five centuries will have long concealed any which may have existed. In 1548 Edward VI ordered the destruction of all aspects of ‘Popish Superstition’ within the churches of his realm. The Jerseymen, strongly influenced by Huguenot immigrants fleeing persecution in France, carried out the King's orders with zeal, and all altars, fonts, holy water stoups and piscinas were removed, the rood screen was dismantled, the stained glass smashed and all but one bell was taken from the tower. A huge triple-decker pulpit was erected in the crossing and pews were arranged around it. Seven galleries were built, including one reserved for smokers. In spite of the return of Anglican worship in the 17th century, the church continued in this state until the 1860s, by which time it had fallen into considerable disrepair. A major project of restoration was undertaken to repair and re-order the building after the conventions of the Church of England. The pulpit was replaced by a much more modest affair at the north west corner of the crossing, the galleries were broken up, the pews were taken out and replaced by a new set facing the restored altar at the east end. The original font, left in the churchyard, was given to Grouville Parish Church and a new font installed. An extension was made to the west end of the Nave, and a new gallery was installed there and in the south transept. New choir stalls were erected in the chancel. In 1930 these were replaced by another new set as a memorial to Charles George Renouf, a Jurat of the Royal Court (the stalls they replaced were given to St Andrew's Church). At the same time the level of the Chancel floor was raised. The South Chapel was re-ordered in 1952 as a memorial to Matthew le Marinel, Rector of St Helier and Dean of Jersey during the German Occupation (1940–45), and again in 2004 to make it more ‘user-friendly’. In 1997 a glass screen was erected to separate the nave extension from the rest of the church to create a Welcome area, new glass doors were installed at the west end and the font was moved from the west end to its original position by the North Door.

=== The organ ===
The organ, considered the finest in the Channel Islands, was built in 1926 by Jardine and Co. of Manchester, and restored and enlarged in 1962 by the John Compton Organ Co. A small ‘Positive’ section was added in 1972 by Messrs. William Hill and Son, and Norman and Beard Ltd. The organ was completely renovated in 1985. In early 2008 it was dismantled as part of the renovation of the church, and temporarily replaced by a purpose built electronic organ. The renovation and rebuilding of the organ was entrusted to The Village Workshop Company. Because the organ chamber was identified as an ancient mortuary chapel of historic importance during the renovation, the organ was reinstated to the South Gallery in late 2013, which is thought to have been its original home, with a small choir and positive section on the north side of the Chancel. With three manuals, in total, the organ has 2,063 pipes. The specification includes a trompette-en-chamade department, which is housed in the west gallery of the church. The trompette-en-chamade is a fanfare trumpet stop, which not only has a stunning visual impact but also supplies a highly effective solo stop which speaks with amazing clarity and prominence. The splendid new casework and display pipes feature stained and polished wood to enhance the woodwork within the church, whilst the display pipes and the pipes of the trompette-en-chamade have been created by Kevin Rutterford of the Village Workshop in polished zinc, and lacquered to prevent tarnishing and staining. To ensure the depth and richness of tone within the confines of the gallery, the 32’ stops use state of the art digital technology, and the console is now situated on a mobile platform, giving flexibility and providing a great visual spectacle for concerts and recitals. The latest transmission and piston systems give thirty departmental and thirty general memory levels. The inaugural recital after the renovation was complete, was given by Ian Tracey from Liverpool Cathedral, on 26 September 2014.

=== Additional buildings ===
A chapel, ‘’La Chapelle de la Madeleine’’, existed in the north west corner of the churchyard until the Reformation. Formerly the Rectory and church offices existed in the churchyard, also on the north side. These were replaced in 1969 by a new Church House building, a large concrete edifice of controversial design incorporating offices (most of which are rented out), a church hall, kitchens and a choir vestry, together with a flat (now used by the church verger/caretaker). The Rectory was moved to a large, purpose built Georgian house in the early 19th century.

=== Historical events of note ===
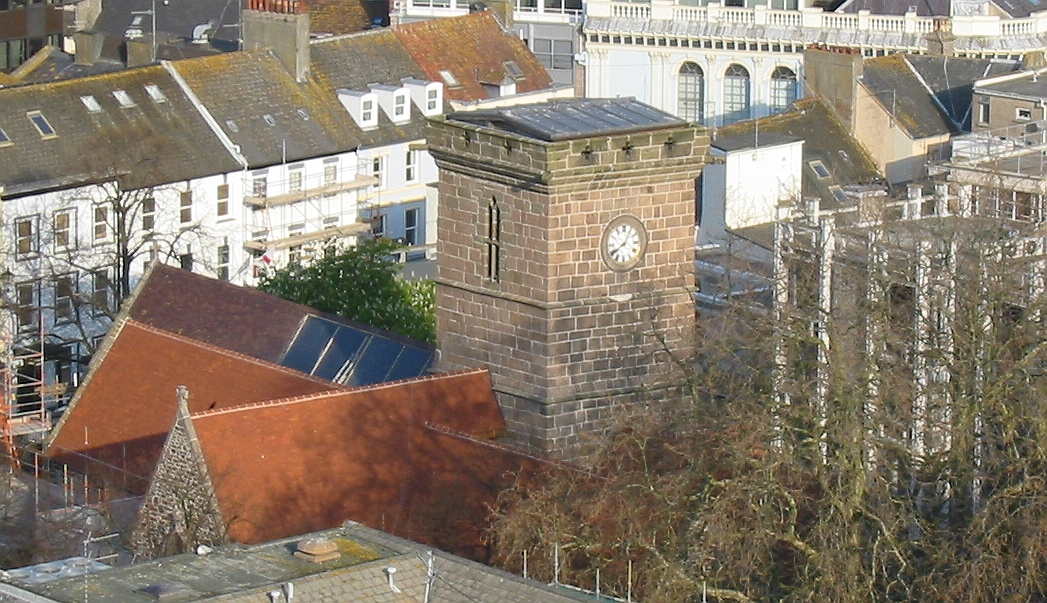
A view from above

A gun battery was erected in the churchyard in 1643 by the pro-Parliamentarian militia besieging Elizabeth Castle, and return fire from the castle struck the tower (the dents in the granite wall can still be seen); it is believed that this accounts for the lack of a steeple, which is assumed to have been destroyed by gunfire at this time. In 1646 Charles, Prince of Wales, and his brother James, Duke of York (the future Kings Charles II of England and James II of England respectively) took refuge in Jersey during the English Civil War and attended services at the church. Unusually for the time the service was conducted in English, though the (Calvinist) services usually held there were normally conducted in French. Indeed, in 1663 a French translation of the Book of Common Prayer was authorised by Charles II for use by Anglicans in the Island. In 1651, after Jersey was captured by Parliamentarian forces, the church was used initially as a barracks by the victors, and then as a garrison church.

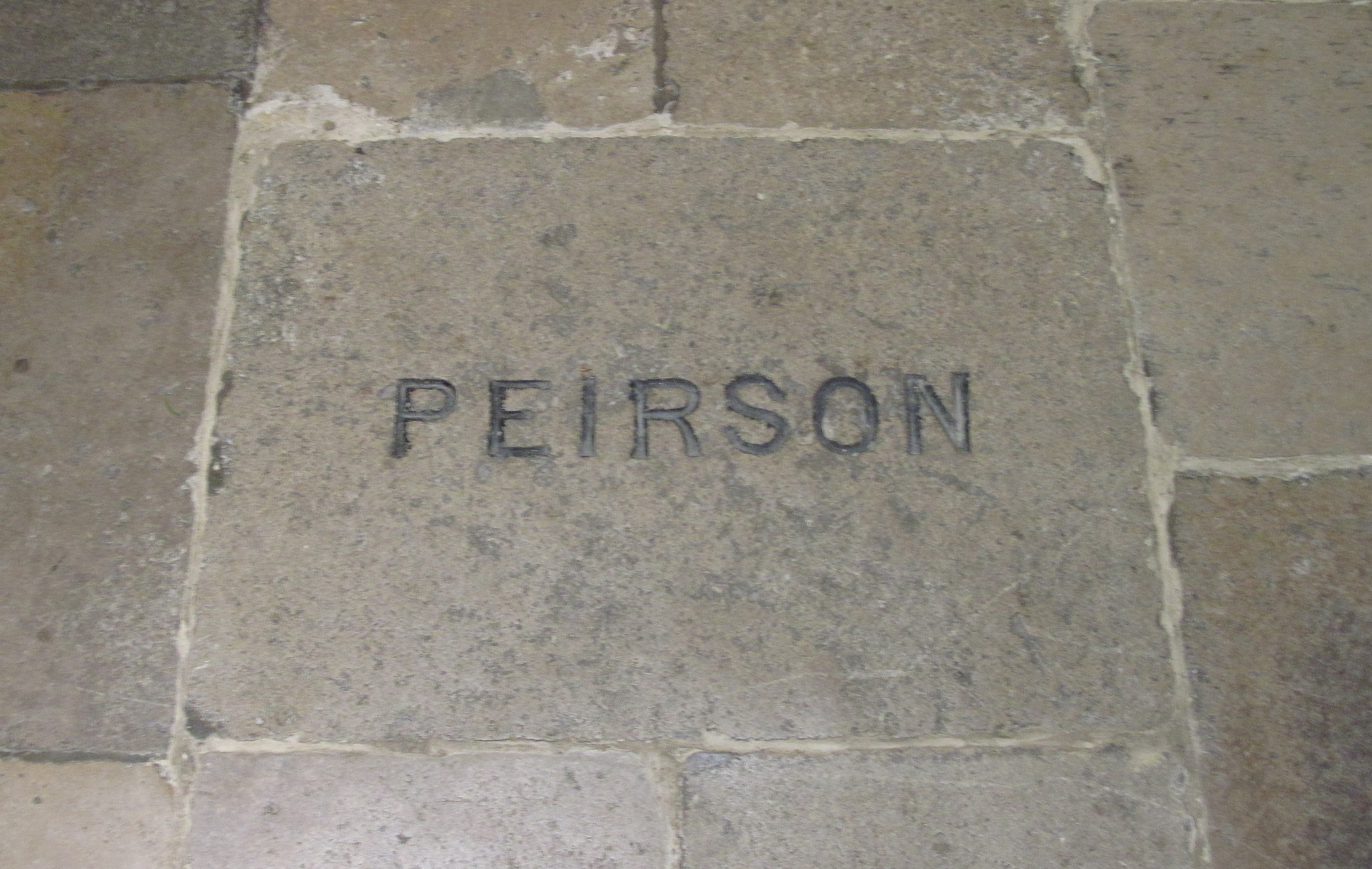
Memorial stone of Major Peirson

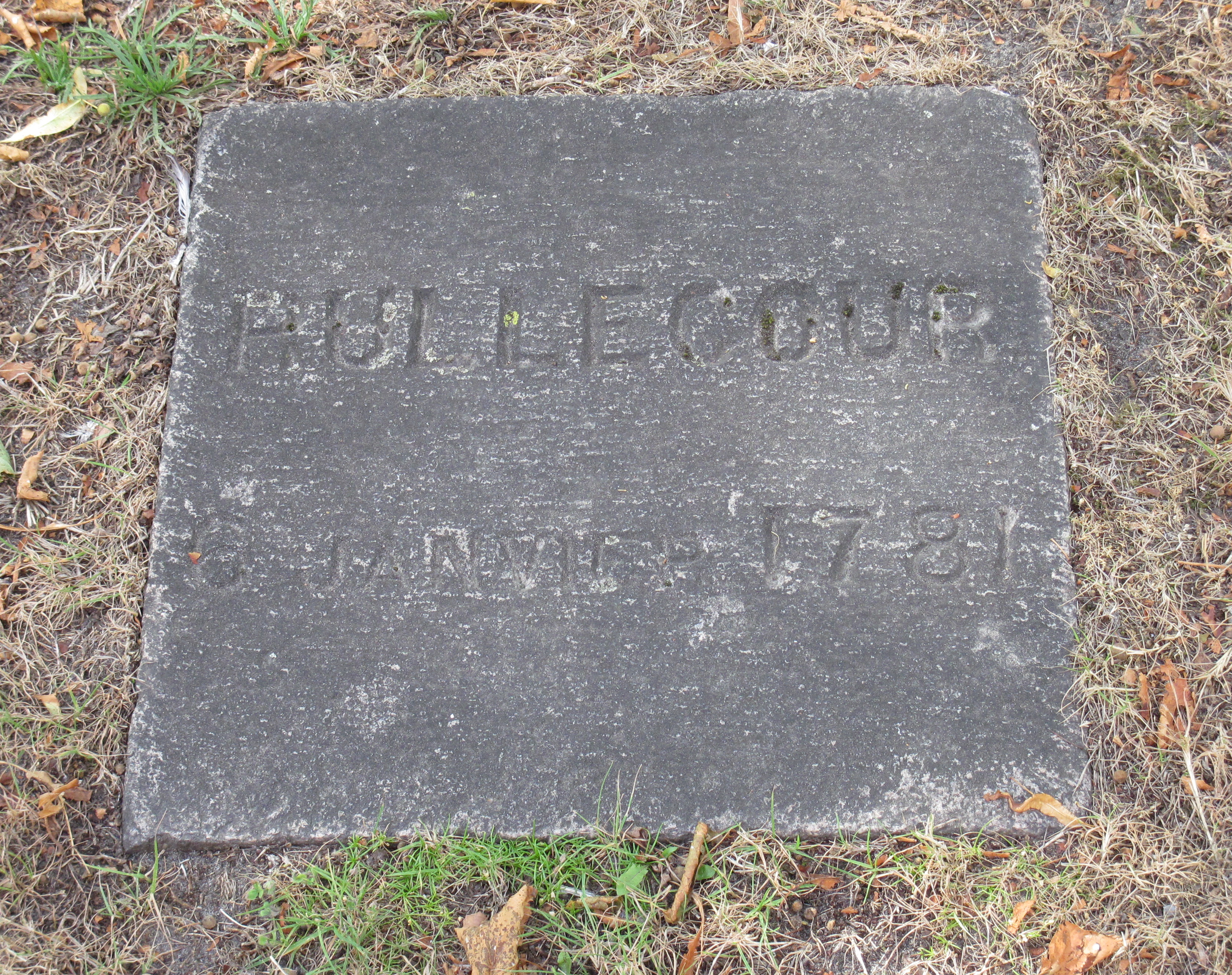
Memorial stone of Baron de Rullecourt

The parish guns for the militia were kept in a store on the site of the present Narthex, and were taken for their own use by invading French forces in 1781 during the Battle of Jersey. The two opposing commanders of the battle, Major Peirson and Baron de Rullecourt – who were both killed during the action – are buried within the boundaries of the church, Peirson under the Chancel (there is a memorial in the Crossing, and a later, rather more elaborate one in the South Chapel) and de Rullecourt in the churchyard, his grave marked by a simple stone. The precise location of Peirson's grave has been controversial, as the Victorian renovations involved the complete alteration of the supposed burial site; consequently it has long been suspected that the stone marking Peirson's grave is in the wrong place. However, in April 2008 archaeological investigations revealed a late 18th-century brick vault containing a single coffin. A flag and a victor's wreath had been placed on the lid, suggesting the burial of a military hero, proving beyond reasonable doubt that the stone did indeed mark Peirson's grave.

During the German Occupation, the occupying forces used the building as a garrison church, although they timed their services so as to allow the regular congregation to continue their normal services. Queen Elizabeth The Queen Mother attended a service in thanksgiving for the end of the Occupation in 1945, and presented the church with a crucifix and pair of candlesticks for the altar.

== The church today ==
Today the church holds two services on a Sunday, together with a short Communion service on several Tuesdays a month, which cater for a local population (largely drawn from outside the parish, since most of the residential areas of St Helier are served by several district churches), and in the summer especially numerous visitors, situated as it is within easy walking distance of several hotels. However, it is also used for various other services: in addition to weddings and funerals, its location next door to the States of Jersey building and the Royal Court makes it the scene of civic services such as that following the Assize d’Heritage, a ceremony marking the start of the legal year, and the service following the annual session of the Ecclesiastical Court in which churchwardens and other church officers are sworn in at the Royal Court. It is also the location of the services related to the swearing in of new Lieutenant Governors. As a Pro-Cathedral, it is the seat of the Bishop of Winchester in the Channel Islands, and the church possesses a crosier for his use.

In the last century, and intermittently in earlier years, the Rector of St Helier has also held the post of Dean of Jersey, head of the Anglican Church in the Island and representative for religious affairs in the States Assembly. It is also the venue for numerous concerts, both by its own choir and organist, and by visiting performers.

The ownership and maintenance of the fabric of the church is the responsibility of the municipality, and the Rector and his Churchwardens serve on various administrative committees in the municipality. The start of a major and costly programme of restoration work prompted calls at the 2006 Rates Assembly for this system to be overturned on the grounds that it was not fair that non-churchgoers should have to pay (via their parish rates) for the upkeep of the building. This plan has received little support, however, with opponents of the change – including both churchgoers and non-churchgoers – pointing out the value of the church as a historic site, its role as a community focus and venue for the Arts, and the complications that would result from a ‘user pays’ system of public service funding.

The church is one of Jersey's listed buildings.

== Music ==
The church has a longstanding tradition of music, and currently has two choirs: The Town Church Choir, which is a mixed robed adult choir, which sings regular weekly Parish Eucharist at the 11:00am Sunday service and one Choral Evensong service each month; and the Town Church Choristers, a robed children's choir of boys and girls aged from 7 to 18, currently around 20 strong, which sings Parish Eucharist once each month at the 11:00am Sunday service, as well as for civic and ceremonial services in the Church. There is also a worship group which sings regularly at the 9:30am contemporary Sunday service.

== Rectors and Curates of St Helier ==
As with all the Ancient Parish Churches, the priest with responsibility for the Parish Church of St Helier has always been a Rector. He is responsible for the conduct of services, but has no official authority in the administration of the church's affairs, these being the responsibility of the two Churchwardens, who are elected, along with other church officers, by the Parish's Ecclesiastical Assembly. In the past few years the Bishop of Winchester, intending to cut down on the number of Anglican clergy in the Island, suspended all vacant Rectories. Outgoing Rectors were replaced by a Priest in Charge, or Ministre Desservant, who lacked the freehold of the Parish and were thus easier to remove. This suspension has now been lifted, however.

=== List of known rectors and curates of the Parish Church of St Helier ===
NB: The letter D in brackets – (D) – indicates that the Rector was also Dean of Jersey; (VD) that he was one of the two Vice Deans. The letter C in brackets - (C) - indicates a curacy.

- 1294 Nicolas du Pont
- 1295 Robert de Carteret
- 1309 John le Sauvage
- 1371-78 Roger Walden (Archbishop of Canterbury, 1398)
- 1432 Rogier Herbert
- 1482-1502 John Bunouet
- 1502-36 Andre de la Hougue
- 1538-40 John Nicolle
- 1541-53 Charles Mabson
- 1553-59 Louis Gibaut
- 1562 Guillaume Morice
- 1567 Thomas Johanne
- 1570-77 Jean de Monage
- 1577-83 Guillaume Bonhomme
- 1583-86 Pierre Henri dit Dancy
- 1591 Matthieu de la Faye
- 1593 Jean de Bihan
- 1595 Claude Parent
- 1596-1638 Thomas Ollivier
- 1638-43 Pierre d’Assigny
- 1645-51 Pierre Faultrat
- 1654-57 Josué Bonhomme
- 1657-60 François le Couteur
- 1660-86 Jean Dumaresq
- 1687-96 Joseph Pythois
- 1696-1705 Jean Dumaresq Jun.
- 1706-16 François le Couteur
- 1717-34 François le Couteur
- 1735-61 Pierre Daniel Tapin
- 1761-84 Jean Dupré (VD)
- 1784-1823 Edouard Dupré (D)
- 1823-37 Corbet Hue (D)
- 1838-44 Francis Jeune (D) (Bishop of Peterborough 1864)
- 1844-49 James Hemery (D)
- 1850-75 Philip Filleul (VD)
- 1875-88 William Corbet le Breton (D)
- 1888-1906 George Orange Balleine (D)
- 1906-37 Samuel Falle (D)
- 1929-36 George A. Twentyman (C)
- 1938-59 Matthew le Marinel (D)
- 1959-71 Alan Giles (D)
- 1971-85 Thomas Goss (D)
- 1985-93 Basil O’Ferrall (D)
- 1993-2005 John Seaford (D)
- 2005-2017 Robert Key (Ministre Desservant and Dean 2005-06, Rector and Dean from 2006)
- 2017–present Mike Keirle

== See also ==
- Religion in Jersey
- Church of St Thomas the Martyr, Newcastle upon Tyne, with which St Helier's is twinned.
