= Mike Keirle =

British Anglican priest

The Very Reverend Mike Keirle
- Dean of Jersey
- Church: Church of England
- Province: Province of Canterbury
- Diocese: Diocese of Winchester
- In office: September 2017 to present
- Other post: Member of the States of Jersey (2017–present)

Orders
- Ordination: 1989 (deacon); 1990 (priest)

Personal details
- Born: Michael Robert Keirle; 3 March 1962 (age 64) St Albans, Hertfordshire, England
- Denomination: Anglicanism
- Spouse: Emma (m. 1990)
- Children: Two
- Education: Verulam School; Trinity College, Bristol

Michael Robert Keirle (born 3 March 1962) is a British Anglican priest. Since 2017, he has served as the Dean of Jersey and Rector of the Parish Church of St Helier. As Dean, he is an ex-officio member of the States of Jersey.

== Early life and education ==
Keirle was born on 3 March 1962 in St Albans, Hertfordshire, England. He was educated at Verulam School (formerly called St Albans Grammar School for Boys), an all-boys state school in St Albans.

== Ordained ministry ==
Having trained for ordained ministry and studied theology at Trinity College, Bristol, he was then ordained in the Church of England as a deacon in 1989 and as a priest in 1990. From 1989 to 1992, he served his curacy at Christ Church, Orpington in the Diocese of Rochester. He then moved to Zimbabwe, where he was Rector of St. Paul's Church, Marlborough, Harare and chaplain to Bishopslea Preparatory School. He then returned to the Diocese of Rochester, where he served as Rector of Keston Parish Church between 1995 and 2003.

In 2003, Keirle moved to the Channel Islands and the Diocese of Winchester having been appointed Rector of St Martin's Parish Church, Guernsey. He also served as Vice-Dean of Guernsey between 2013 and 2017. In April 2017, he was announced as the next Dean of Jersey, in succession to Bob Key. He was sworn in as dean on 7 September 2017. He is additionally the Rector of the Parish Church of St Helier, and an ex officio a member of the States of Jersey.

== Personal life ==
In 1990, Keirle married Emma. They have two children: one son and one daughter.
