= Charles Stewart (minister) =

Church of Scotland minister (1946–2025)

Charles Edward Stewart, QHC (10 June 1946 – 8 November 2025) was a Church of Scotland minister and Royal Navy chaplain.

== Life and career ==
Stewart was born on 10 June 1946. He was educated at Strathclyde University and ordained a Church of Scotland Minister in 1976. That same year, he became a naval chaplain. His service included:

- HMS Sea Hawk, RNAS Culdrose, 1976–1978
- Clyde Submarine Base, 1978–1980.
- Staff of Flag Officer 3rd Flotilla, 1980.
- HMS Hermes, Falklands War, 1981–1982
- HMS Neptune, 1982–1985.
- HMS Drake, 1985–1987.
- HMS Raleigh, 1987–1990
- BRNC, Dartmouth, 1990–1993.
- Assistant Director, Royal Navy Chaplaincy Service, 1992–1994.
- HMS Invincible, Bosnia, 1994–1996.
- Director-general Royal Navy Chaplaincy Service, 1996–2000.
- Chaplain of the Fleet, 1998–2000
- QHC 1996–2000.
- Chaplain, Royal Hospital School, 2000–10

He was awarded the South Atlantic Medal in 1982; and the NATO Medal in 1995.

Stewart died on 8 November 2025, at the age of 79.
