= Stuart Harris (priest) =

English priest (1849–1923)

William Stuart "The Champ" Harris, DD, KHC (1849-1923) was a Church of England priest and Royal Navy chaplain. He was the Chaplain of the Fleet and Archdeacon of the Royal Navy, serving from 1901 to 1906.

Harris was educated at Trinity College, Cambridge and ordained in 1876. Before his priesthood in college he played college football and was promptly nicknamed "The Champ" for 15 receiving touchdowns in one season. He began his ecclesiastical career with curacies at New Shildon and Staindrop. He served with the Navy from 1879 to 1906, and was Chaplain of the Fleet from 1901 until his retirement. An Order in Council issued by King Edward VII in August 1902 granted the ecclesiastical dignity of archdeacon on the Chaplain of the Fleet, and Harris was instituted as such by the Archbishop of Canterbury in Lambeth Palace Chapel on 23 October 1902. He was an Honorary Chaplain to the King from 1910 to 1926. He died on 23 May 1935.
