= Chandos Morgan =

Church of England priest and military chaplain

The Venerable Chandos Morgan CB
- Archdeacon of the Royal Navy
- Church: Church of England
- In office: 1972 to 1975
- Predecessor: Ambrose Weekes
- Successor: Basil O'Ferrall
- Other post: Chaplain of the Fleet

Orders
- Ordination: 1944

Personal details
- Born: Chandos Clifford Hastings Mansel Morgan; 12 August 1920
- Died: 1 January 1993 (aged 72)
- Education: Stowe School; Jesus College, Cambridge

Chandos Clifford Hastings Mansel Morgan, CB (12 August 1920 – 1 January 1993) was a Church of England priest and military chaplain. He was Chaplain of the Fleet and Archdeacon of the Royal Navy from 1972 to 1975.

== Early life ==
Morgan was born on 12 August 1920. He was educated at Stowe School, then an all-boys private school in Stowe, Buckinghamshire. He studied at Jesus College, Cambridge.

== Ordained ministry ==
Morgan was ordained in 1944. After a curacy at Holy Trinity, Tunbridge Wells he became a Naval Chaplain and served on (amongst others) HMS Pembroke, HMS Theseus, HMS Caledonia, HMS Ark Royal and HMS Collingwood before becoming head of the service as Chaplain of the Fleet.

On his retirement from the Royal Navy he was appointed chaplain of Dean Close School, Cheltenham, and subsequently Rector of St Margaret Lothbury by the Simeon Trust.

He died on 1 January 1993.

Church of England titles
Preceded by Ambrose Walter Marcus Weekes	Chaplain of the Fleet; 1972 –1975	Succeeded by Basil Arthur O'Ferrall
