= Leslie Wright (priest) =

The Venerable Leslie Wright CBE was an eminent Anglican priest in the second half of the 20th century.

He was born on 18 November 1899 and educated at St. Bees School and the Royal Military Academy, Woolwich. He was Commissioned into the Royal Artillery in 1919 and retired in 1926. He was Travelling Secretary for the Officers' Christian Union from 1928 to 1935 when he was ordained a priest in the Church of England. After a curacy at St Andrews, Nottingham he became an RAF Chaplain, rising through the service to become an Honorary Chaplain to the King and eventually its Archdeacon (Chaplain-in-Chief). He was Vicar of Wimbledon from 1953 to 1961 and of Kingston Vale until his retirement in 1968.

He died on 28 April 1972.

== Notes and references ==
Church of England titles
Preceded by John Arthur Jagoe	Chaplain-in-Chief of the RAF; 1949–1953	Succeeded by Alan Giles
