= John Wilson (Royal Navy chaplain) =

John Kenneth Wilson, CB, CBE, (15 October 1890 – 17 August 1949) was a Church of England priest and former Royal Navy chaplain. He was Chaplain of the Fleet, Director General of the Naval Chaplaincy Service and Archdeacon for the Royal Navy from 1943 to 1947.

He was educated at St Paul's School, London and Corpus Christi College, Cambridge. After a curacy at St Michael at Bowes, London, he was a Chaplain to the Forces from 1917 to 1920. He was then at Newton Nottage from 1920 to 1926; then St. James, Portsmouth until 1928. He then served as a Naval Chaplain until 1947.
