= Leonard Coulshaw =

British Chaplain of the Fleet (1896–1988)

Leonard Coulshaw CB MC FKC (24 February 1896 – 22 July 1988) was Chaplain of the Fleet and Archdeacon of the Royal Navy from 1948 to 1952.

Born on 24 February 1896 and educated at Southend High School for Boys and King's College London, he served in the British Army's Essex Regiment during the First World War. Coulshaw served as a combatant with the 10th Essex. He joined as a private in September 1914, was commissioned in January 1916, and ended the war as an acting captain. He was wounded at Gallipoli, and the bullet which lodged near his lower ribs could not be extracted. (In 1922, he was still in pain from the wound). He then fought on the Somme, and was awarded a Military Cross in April 1917.

For conspicuous gallantry and devotion to duty. He led a platoon in the attack in the most gallant manner, reached his objective, and consolidated his position under very heavy hostile shallfire.

Later that year, he was wounded at Ypres by a shell which caused slight damage to his throat. In 1920 at Cologne, he fell from a horse and a blow to the forehead led to headaches and bad memory.

He was ordained in 1923 and after a curacy at St Andrew's, Romford was commissioned as a chaplain in the Royal Navy. Amongst others he served on HMS Cyclops, HMS Iron Duke, HMS Effingham, HMS Ganges, HMS Royal Sovereign and HMS Revenge before becoming the head of the service in 1948. After four years he became Vicar of West End; and then in 1954 (his last post before retirement) Frensham.

An Honorary Chaplain to both the King George VI and Queen Elizabeth II, he died on 22 July 1988.

== Notes ==
Church of England titles
| Preceded by John Kenneth Wilson | Chaplain of the Fleet; 1948 –1952 | Succeeded by Frank Noel Chamberlain |
