= John Berry (priest) =

Church of England priest (1849–1923)

John Harcourt Berry (1849–1923) was a Church of England priest and Royal Navy chaplain. He was the Chaplain of the Fleet, serving from 1899 to 1901.

Berry was educated at Christ Church, Oxford. He was ordained deacon in 1874 and priest in 1875 and began his ecclesiastical career with a curacy at Preston-on-Stour. He served with the Navy from 1876 to 1901

Berry was appointed an Honorary Chaplain to the King on 27 March 1902.
