= Raymond Roberts (Royal Navy chaplain) =

Welsh Anglican priest and Royal Navy chaplain

The Venerable Raymond Roberts CB QHC
- Archdeacon of the Royal Navy
- Church: Church of England
- Predecessor: Basil O'Ferrall
- Successor: Noël Jones (bishop of Sodor and Man)
- Other post: Chaplain of the Fleet (1980–1984)

Orders
- Ordination: 1956 (deacon); 1957 (priest)

Personal details
- Born: Raymond Harcourt Roberts; 14 April 1931
- Died: 25 September 2019 (aged 88)
- Denomination: Anglicanism
- Education: St Edmund Hall, Oxford; St Michael's College, Llandaff

Raymond Harcourt Roberts CB QHC (14 April 1931 – 25 September 2019) was a Welsh Anglican priest and Royal Navy chaplain. He served as Chaplain of the Fleet and Archdeacon of the Royal Navy from 1980 to 1984.

== Early life ==
Roberts was born on 14 April 1931. He studied at St Edmund Hall, Oxford and graduated with a Bachelor of Arts (BA) degree) in 1954; his BA was promoted to a Master of Arts (MA Oxon) degree in 1958 as per tradition. From 1954 to 1956, he studied for ordination at St. Michael's College, Llandaff.

== Ordained ministry ==
Roberts was ordained into the Church in Wales as a deacon in 1956 and as a priest in 1957. From 1956 to 1959, he served as an assistant curate at St Basil's Church, Bassaleg, south Wales. During his curacy, he was also a part-time military chaplain with the Royal Naval Reserve.

On 1 July 1959, he transferred from the Royal Naval Reserve to the Royal Navy and was commissioned as a chaplain; members of the Royal Navy Chaplaincy Services do not hold rank, unlike member of the Royal Army Chaplains' Department and Royal Air Force Chaplains Branch. He served on (amongst others) destroyers and frigates, at the Royal Naval Engineering College and Britannia Royal Naval College and on HMS Ark Royal. From 1980 to 1984, he served as Chaplain of the Fleet and Archdeacon of the Royal Navy.

After retiring from the military in 1984, he returned to parish ministry. From 1985 to 1989, he was an assistant curate at St George's Church, Badshot Lea, Surrey. During that time, he was also General Secretary of the Jerusalem and the Middle East Church Association. From 1990 to 1995, he was a chaplain of Llandaff Cathedral. He retired from full-time ministry in 1995 and was granted a permission to officiate.

He died on 25 September 2019 at the age of 88.

== Honours ==
Roberts was appointed an Honorary Chaplain to the Queen (QHC) on 26 March 1980. In the 1984 New Year Honours, he was appointed Companion of the Order of the Bath (CB).

Church of England titles
Preceded by Basil O'Ferrall	Archdeacon of the Royal Navy; 1980–1984	Succeeded by Noël Jones
Military offices
Preceded by Basil O'Ferrall	Chaplain of the Fleet; 1980–1984	Succeeded by Noël Jones
