= Anthony Williams (bishop) =

British Anglican bishop

The Right Reverend Anthony Williams ChStJ
- Bishop of Bermuda
- Church: Church of England
- See: Bermuda
- In office: 1956 to 1962
- Predecessor: John Jagoe
- Successor: John Armstrong

Orders
- Ordination: 1915 (deacon); 1916 (priest)
- Consecration: 1956

Personal details
- Born: Anthony Lewis Elliott Williams; 5 February 1892
- Died: 31 August 1975 (aged 83)
- Denomination: Anglicanism
- Spouse: Mary (m. 1922)
- Children: Four

Anthony Lewis Elliott Williams ChStJ (5 February 1892 – 31 August 1975) was a British Anglican bishop. He was the third Bishop of Bermuda, serving from 1956 to 1962.

== Early life and education ==
Williams was educated at the King's School, Worcester, a private school in Worcester, Worcestershire. He studied at Exeter College, Oxford, and trained for Holy Orders at Salisbury Theological College, an Anglican theological college.

== Ordained ministry ==
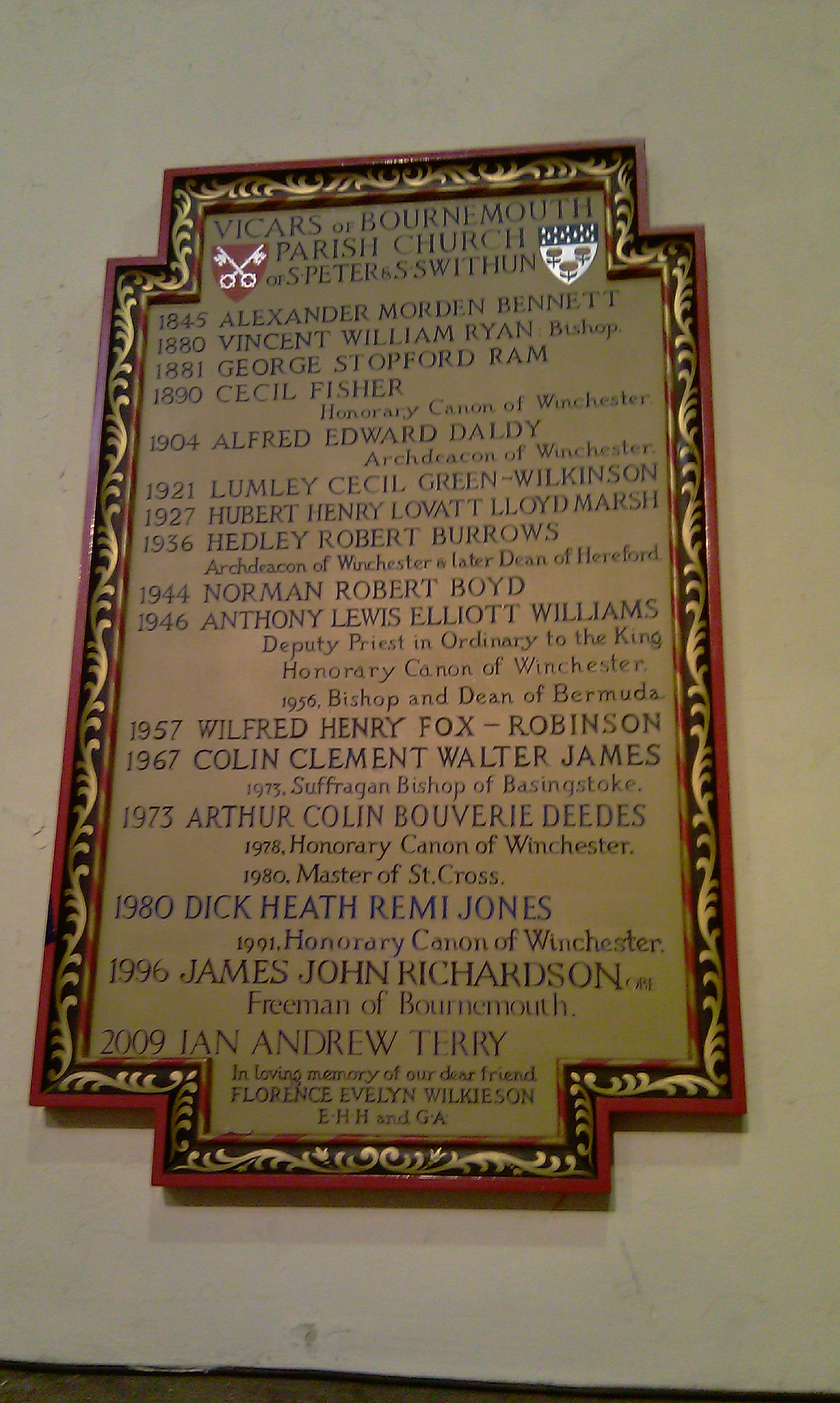
Plaque listing Vicars of St Peter's Church, Bournemouth

Williams was ordained in the Church of England as a deacon in 1915 and as a priest in 1916. From 1915 to 1918, he served his curacy at St John's Church, Kidderminster in the Diocese of Worcester. From 1918 to 1920, he was a curate at Christ Church, High Harrogate in the Diocese of Ripon. From 1921 to 1931, he served as Chaplain to the Bishop of Ripon (Thomas Strong and then Edward Burroughs). He was additionally Vicar of St Mary the Virgin, North Stainley between 1921 and 1925, and Rector of St John the Baptist's Church, Kirby Wiske between 1925 and 1931.

From 1931 to 1946, Williams was Vicar of St Mary's Church, Banbury in the Diocese of Oxford. From 1940 to 1946, he was also an honorary canon of Christ Church Cathedral, Oxford. In 1944, he had been considered for the post of Bishop of Buckingham but not appointed. In March 1945, he was additionally appointed a Deputy Priest-in-Ordinary: he served King George VI between 1945 and 1952, and Queen Elizabeth II from 1952 to 1956. From 1946 to 1956, he was Vicar of St Peter's Church, Bournemouth in the Diocese of Winchester. He was also a chaplain of the Order of St John of Jerusalem from 1953 to 1956, and an honorary canon of Winchester Cathedral from 1950 to 1956.

=== Episcopal ministry ===
Williams was consecrated a bishop in 1956. From 1956 to 1962, he served as the Bishop of Bermuda. From 1956 until his death, he was also the Sub-Prelate of the Order of St John of Jerusalem.

== Personal life ==
In 1922, Williams married Mary Freeman. Together they had four children: one son and three daughters. Williams died aged 83.

== Honours ==
In June 1937, Williams was appointed a Serving Brother of the Order of St John (SBStJ). In June 1946, he was promoted to Officer of the Order of St John (OStJ). In June 1953, he was promoted to Chaplain of the Order of St John (ChStJ).

Honour Ribbon:

- Order of St. John (ChStJ)

Church of England titles
Preceded by John Jagoe	Bishop of Bermuda; 1956 –1962	Succeeded by John Armstrong
