= John Cox-Edwards =

John Cox Cox-Edwards (1839–1926) was a Church of England priest and chaplain in the Royal Navy who rose to be Chaplain of the Fleet from 1888 to 1899.

Harbord was educated at Emmanuel College, Cambridge He was ordained deacon in 1863; and priest in 1864. After curacies in Hinckley, Colmworth and Bolnhurst he was with the Royal Navy from 1871 to 1899. He served in China, Ireland, Australia and Egypt before coming back to England as Head of the Royal Navy Chaplaincy Service and inspector of Naval Schools. He was an Honorary Chaplain to the Queen from 1896 until 1901. He was then Rector of Ecton from 1900 to 1908.

In retirement he lived in Southsea and died there on 25 March 1926.
