= John Jagoe =

Irish Anglican bishop

John Arthur Jagoe CBE (2 January 1889 – 16 October 1962) was an Irish Anglican bishop who served as Chaplain-in-Chief of the (British) Royal Air Force and the second Bishop of Bermuda.

== Early life ==
Born on 2 January 1889, Jagoe educated at Trinity College, Dublin.

== Career ==
Jagoe was ordained in 1912. He was a Chaplain to the Forces 4th Class (captain) in World War I and until he transferred to the Royal Air Force. On 30 October 1923, he was commissioned into the Royal Air Force Chaplains Branch and granted the relative rank of squadron leader. He was granted a permanent commission on 6 July 1927. He was granted the relative rank of group captain on 6 March 1938.

He was appointed Assistant Chaplain-in-Chief in 1939. On 10 April 1944, he was granted the relative rank of air commodore and was appointed Chaplain-in-Chief. He was granted the relative rank of air vice-marshal on 1 July 1946. He was succeeded in the appointment of Chaplain-in-Chief by Leslie Wright on 31 March 1949. He retired from the Royal Air Force on 26 May 1949.

He was appointed to the colonial Episcopate as Bishop of Bermuda following his retirement from the Royal Air Force. He was consecrated bishop by Geoffrey Fisher, Archbishop of Canterbury, on Candlemas (2 February) 1949 at Westminster Abbey. He held the post to 1955 when he resigned in ill-health. From 1956 to his death, he was Rector of Schull, County Cork, Ireland.

He died on 16 October 1962.

== Personal life ==
In 1919, Jagoe married Janet Flewett, the daughter of William Flewett the 8th Bishop of Cork, Cloyne and Ross. They had no children.

== Honours and decorations ==
Jagoe was appointed Honorary Chaplain to the King on 30 January 1943. He vacated the appointment on 26 May 1949.

In the 1946 King's Birthday Honours, he was appointed Commander of the Order of the British Empire (CBE). In the 1949 New Year Honours, he was appointed Companion of the Order of the Bath (CB).

On 18 November 1947, he was awarded the Czechoslovak Republic's Medal of Merit (1st Class) "in recognition of valuable services rendered in connection with the war".

Church of England titles
Preceded by Maurice Edwards	Chaplain-in-Chief of the RAF; 1944–1949	Succeeded by Leslie Wright
Preceded by Arthur Browne	Bishop of Bermuda; 1949 –1956	Succeeded by Anthony Williams
