= Ray Jones (chaplain) =

British priest

The Reverend Ray Jones QHC
- Church: Church of England

Orders
- Ordination: 1958 (deacon) by Robert Mortimer

Personal details
- Born: David Raymond Jones; 18 March 1934 (age 92) Carmarthenshire, Wales
- Denomination: Anglicanism
- Education: St Michael's School, Llanelli; Truro School
- Alma mater: University of Wales Trinity Saint David; St. Catherine's College, Oxford; Wycliffe Hall, Oxford

David Raymond Jones QHC (born 18 March 1934) is an Anglican priest and former Royal Navy chaplain. Jones was Director of Ordinands for the Royal Navy from 1977 to 1980 and an Honorary Chaplain to The Queen from 1984 to 1989. He was Warden and Director of the Divine Healing Mission from 1989 to 1997.

== Early life and education ==
Jones was born in Carmarthenshire, Wales, on 18 March 1934. He attended two independent boarding schools: St Michael's School in Carmarthenshire and Truro School in Cornwall. In 1951, he proceeded to the University of Wales, Lampeter, graduating with a B.A. in 1954. From 1954 to 1957, he trained for ordination at St. Catherine's College, Oxford and Wycliffe Hall, Oxford. He received his B.A. (Hons) in 1957 and his M.A. in 1961.

== Ordained ministry ==
Jones was ordained as a deacon in 1958 and as a priest in 1959, at Exeter Cathedral by Robert Mortimer, Bishop of Exeter. He began his career as a curate at St David's Church, Exeter from September 1958 to July 1960. He was then curate at Tamerton Foliot from July 1960 to January 1961, and at the Church of St Mary, Bideford from January 1961 to September 1963. Following this, he was the school chaplain of Grenville College until July 1966.

Jones joined the Royal Navy in September 1966. He was chaplain to several of Her Majesty's Ships, including HMS Drake, HMS Illustrious, HMS Invincible, HMS Mercury, HMS Osprey, and HMS Triumph, and served in the Falklands War. He also served as chaplain to RNH Mtarfa, the Royal Navy's main hospital in Malta, and to its senior base there. From 1977 to 1980, he was Director of Ordinands for the Royal Navy. In 1978, he returned to England to take up the post of Naval Director of the Royal Army Chaplains' Department, located in Amport House. On 11 June 1984, he was appointed an Honorary Chaplain to The Queen (QHC), succeeding bishop Noël Jones. During this time, he completed a preaching tour of Australia, New Zealand and Canada.

In 1989, Jones left the Navy and was given the post of Warden and Director of the Divine Healing Mission. (Note: The Divine Healing Mission (later renamed the Crowhurst Christian Healing Centre) was a revival of the Ministry of Healing by the Church of England. It is located in Crowhurst, East Sussex.) He has been semi-retired since 1997, when he left the Divine Healing Mission. Since 2009, he has resided in Steyning, West Sussex, where he is an honorary chaplain at St Andrew and St Cuthman's Church.
