= George Davys =

English Anglican bishop (1780–1864)

The Right Reverend George Davys
- Bishop of Peterborough
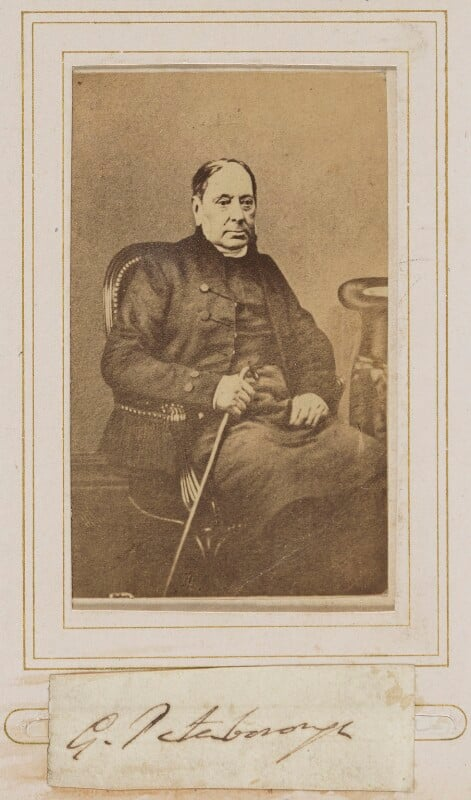
- Davys, 1860–1864
- Diocese: Diocese of Peterborough
- In office: 1839–1864
- Predecessor: Herbert Marsh
- Successor: Francis Jeune
- Other post: Dean of Chester (1831–1839)

Personal details
- Born: 1 October 1780 Loughborough
- Died: 18 April 1864 (aged 83) The Bishop's Palace, Peterborough
- Buried: Peterborough Cathedral
- Denomination: Anglican
- Education: Loughborough Grammar School; Christ's College, Cambridge

George Davys (1 October 1780 – 18 April 1864) was an English cleric, tutor to Princess Victoria, and later Bishop of Peterborough. He was previously Dean of Chester. He himself was educated at Loughborough Grammar School, where a house is named after him.

== Life ==
The son of John Davys of Rempstone, Nottinghamshire, by Sophia, daughter of the Rev. Benjamin Wigley of Sawley, Derbyshire, was born at Loughborough, Leicestershire, 1 October 1780. In 1799 he entered as a sizar at Christ's College, Cambridge, and came out tenth wrangler in 1803. He was elected a Fellow of his college 14 January 1806, and in the same year proceeded M.A.

Davys became curate, first of Littlebury, Essex, then of Chesterford to 1817, and afterwards of Swaffham Prior. In 1811 he was presented on his own petition to the vicarage of Willoughby-on-the-Wolds, Lincolnshire, which he held until 1829.

The education of Princess Victoria having been entrusted to his care by her mother Princess Victoria, Duchess of Kent, Davys took up residence at Kensington Palace in 1827, and filled the position of principal master to the princess until the death of William IV. In April 1829 he was presented by the crown to the rectory of Allhallows-on-the-Wall, London, which he continued to hold until his elevation to the episcopal bench.

Davys was appointed dean of Chester 10 January 1831, and at the following commencement at Cambridge was created D.D. On 7 May 1839 he was advanced to the bishopric of Peterborough, and was consecrated on 16 June. An evangelical, he took no active part either in religious controversy or in politics. He died of bronchitis at the Palace, Peterborough, 18 April 1864, and was buried in the graveyard of the cathedral on 23 April.

== Works ==
Davys wrote, with charges and sermons:

- Village Conversations on the Liturgy of the Church of England, 1820; 8th ed. 1829.
- Village Conversations on the principal Offices of the Church, 1824; another ed. 1849.
- A Village Conversation on the Catechism of the Church of England, printed in Religious Tracts of Society for Promoting Christian Knowledge, vol. iii. 1836.
- Letters between a Father and his Son on the Roman History and other subjects, 1848.
- A Plain and Short History of England in Letters from a Father to his Son, 1870.

He also compiled educational works, which appeared from time to time anonymously in the Cottagers' Monthly Visitor, the National Church Magazine, and elsewhere.

== Family ==
Davys married in 1814 Marianne, daughter of the Rev. Edmund Mapletoft, rector of Anstye, Hertfordshire. She died at the Palace, Peterborough, 14 December 1858, aged 69.

Church of England titles
Preceded by Henry Phillpotts	Dean of Chester; 1831–1839	Succeeded by Frederick Anson
Preceded by Herbert Marsh	Bishop of Peterborough; 1839–1864	Succeeded by Francis Jeune
