= John Harbord =

British priest (1812–1896)

John Bradley Harbord (1812 – 1896) was a Church of England priest and author.

Harbord was born in Liverpool on 27 June 1828 and educated at St John's College, Cambridge. He was ordained in 1854 and after a curacy at Lower Halstow spent the remainder of his ecclesiastical career as a Naval chaplain, rising to be Chaplain of the Fleet from 1882 to 1888. He was an Honorary Chaplain to the Queen from 1889 until his death on 13 February 1896.

== Works ==
- Harbord, J.B. (1865). Definitions of Astronomy and Navigation Made Easy (PDF) (Hardbound). Glasgow, London: William Blackwood & Sons.
