= Noël Jones (bishop of Sodor and Man) =

British bishop (1932–2009)

The Right Reverend Noël Jones CB QHC
- Bishop of Sodor and Man
- Church: Church of England
- Province: Province of York
- Diocese: Diocese of Sodor and Man
- In office: 1989 to 2003
- Predecessor: Arthur Attwell
- Successor: Graeme Knowles
- Other posts: Member of the Legislative Council of the Isle of Man (1989–2003); Chaplain of the Fleet (1984–1989)

Orders
- Ordination: 1955 (deacon); 1956 (priest)

Personal details
- Born: Noël Debroy Jones; 25 December 1932
- Died: 28 August 2009 (aged 76)
- Denomination: Anglicanism

Noël Debroy Jones CB QHC (25 December 1932 – 28 August 2009) was an Anglican bishop. He was the Bishop of Sodor and Man in the Church of England.

== Early life and education ==
Jones was born on 25 December 1932 in Monmouthshire, Wales. He was educated at Haberdashers' West Monmouth School, then an all-boys grammar school in Pontypool, Torfaen. He studied at St David's College, Lampeter and trained for ordination at Wells Theological College.

== Ordained ministry ==
Jones was ordained in the Church in Wales as a deacon in 1955 and as a priest in 1956. He held two curacies in the Diocese of Monmouth: at St James' Church, Tredegar (1955 to 1957) and at the Church of St Mark, Newport (1957 to 1960). He was the vicar of Kano in Nigeria from 1960 to 1962.

=== Military service ===
In 1962, Jones joined the Royal Navy as a chaplain and was deployed to Brunei and Borneo. He also completed a commando course prior to service in Aden with 42 Commando in 1967. He served in Saudi Arabia and as Staff Chaplain at the Ministry of Defence. In 1983, he was named an Honorary Chaplain to The Queen. In 1984, he was succeeded in this post by Ray Jones. The same year, he became Chaplain of the Fleet and Archdeacon for the Royal Navy, as well being made a Companion of the Order of the Bath.

=== Episcopal ministry ===
In 1989 Jones left the navy and was appointed Bishop of Sodor and Man. During his time as bishop he had an ex officio seat in the Legislative Council and was a member of the Department of Education and the War Pensions Committee as well as being a trustee of King William's College. In 2003 he stood down as the diocesan bishop.

=== Views ===
Jones belonged to the Traditional Anglo-Catholic tradition of the Church of England. He was never a member of Forward in Faith, a traditionalist organization operating within Anglicanism. He was opposed to the ordination of women to the priesthood.

== Later life ==
Jones died on 28 August 2009.

Church of England titles
Preceded by Raymond Roberts	Chaplain of the Fleet; 1984–1989	Succeeded by Michael Henley
Preceded by Arthur Attwell	Bishop of Sodor and Man; 1989–2003	Succeeded by Graeme Knowles
