= Royal Naval Chaplaincy Service =

Chaplaincy Service for the Royal Navy

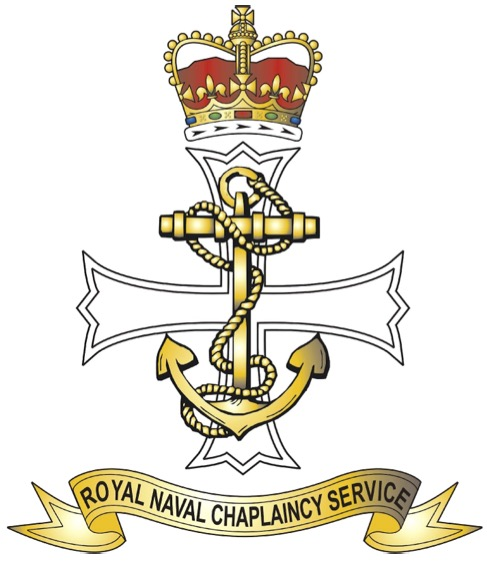
- Badge of the Royal Naval Chaplaincy Service
- Country: United Kingdom
- Branch: Royal Navy
- Role: Chaplaincy
- Garrison/HQ: HMS Excellent, Whale Island, Hampshire

Commanders
- Chaplain of the Fleet: Andrew Hillier

Insignia
- Royal Navy church pennant

- Shoulder insignia

The Royal Naval Chaplaincy Service provides chaplains to the Royal Navy. The chaplains are commissioned by the Sovereign but do not hold military rank other than that of "Chaplain Royal Navy".

The senior chaplain in the Royal Navy is the Chaplain of the Fleet, the current post holder being Andrew Hillier, an Anglican priest, who is also the Archdeacon for the Royal Navy.

Chaplains do not hold a standard military rank, and are usually addressed as Padre, Reverend, or, more informally, Bish.

The majority of chaplains are recruited from a number of Christian denominations. However, to better reflect the changing demographics of the United Kingdom and its military, the Ministry of Defence announced in November 2023 that it would begin recruiting non-religious pastoral support officers from 2024, as is already done in prisons, universities and the NHS.

== Training ==
Chaplains join the Royal Navy as experienced clergy of their denomination. They undergo naval training at Britannia Royal Naval College alongside other Royal Navy officer cadets. Those serving with the Royal Marines may be selected to attempt commando training: if successful they become Royal Navy Commandos and wear the Commando green beret and, on No 1 uniform, the Commando Dagger badge. Those who serve with the Submarine Service may earn their submarine service "Dolphins".

== Chaplains of the Fleet ==
The role of Chaplain of the Fleet, being Head of the Naval Chaplains, was established on 13 May 1859, and was originally attached to the role of Senior Chaplain at Greenwich Hospital and was also the Inspector of Naval Schools. An Order in Council issued by King Edward VII in August 1902 granted the ecclesiastical dignity of archdeacon on the Chaplain of the Fleet.

Thomas Ken was appointed Chaplain of the Fleet by King Charles II in 1683.

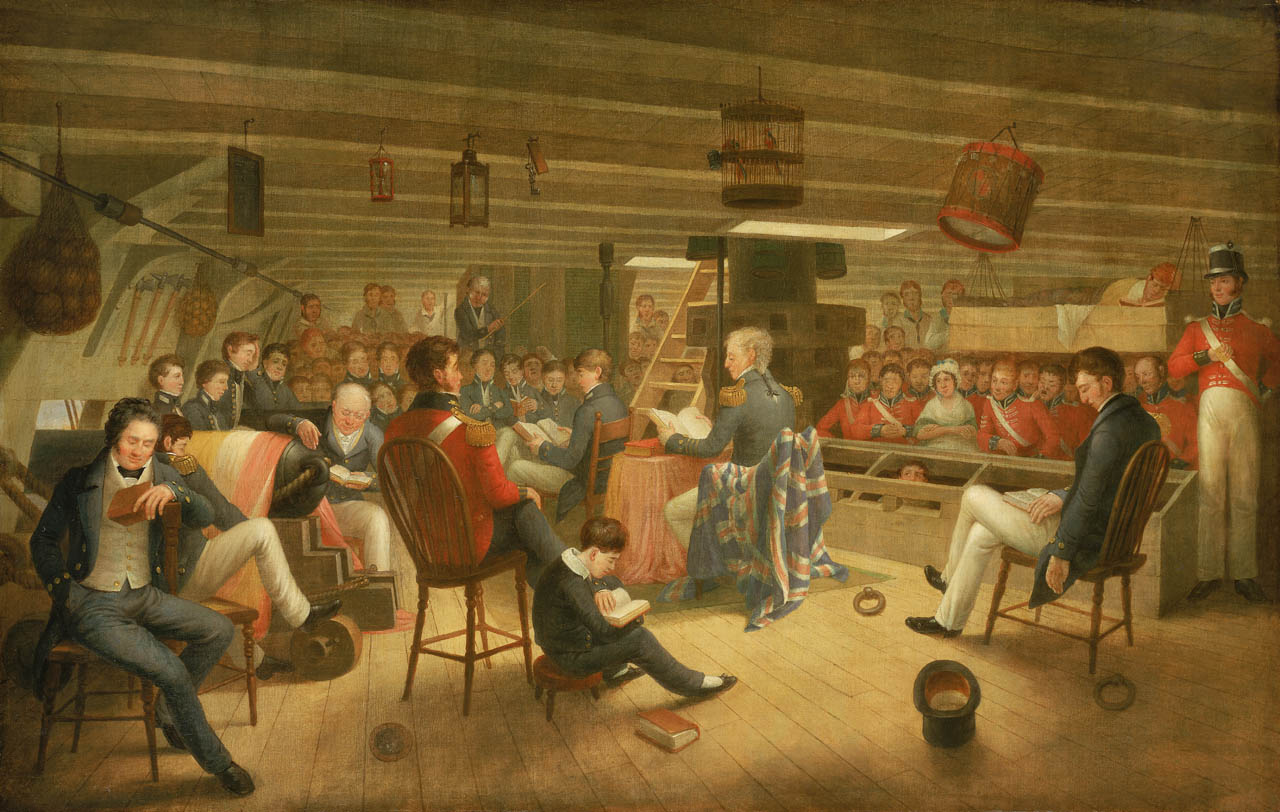
Divine service as it is usually performed on board a British frigate at sea (circa 1836).

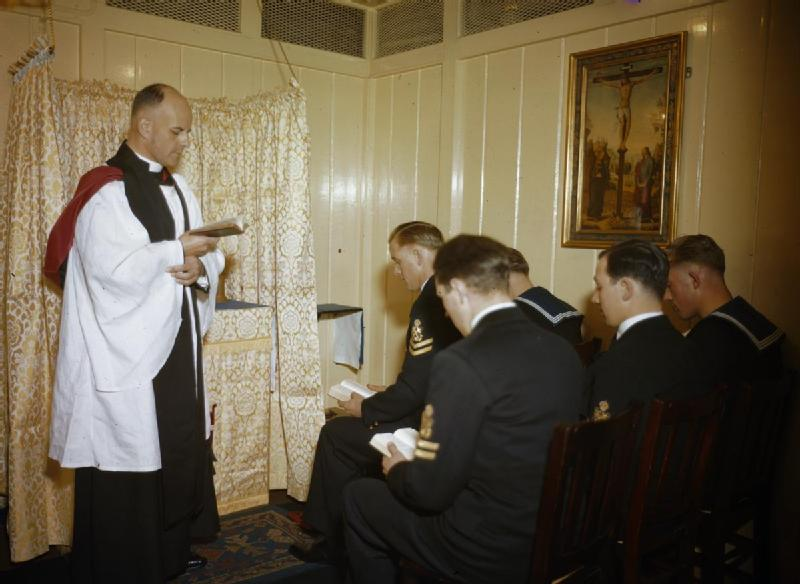
Service on the cruiser HMS Cumberland, November 1942

- 1859–1865: Unknown
- 1865–1871: William Guise-Tucker
- 1871–1876: Unknown
- 23 November 1876 – 1882 (retd): John Cawston
- 1882–1888: John Harbord
- 1888 – 17 January 1899 (retd): John Cox-Edwards
- 1899 – 1 March 1901 (retd): John Berry
- 1901 – 6 October 1906 (retd): Stuart Harris
- 1906 – 1 December 1917 (retd): Hugh Wood
- 1917–1924: Charles Ingles
- 1924 – 29 January 1929 (retd): Robert McKew
- 1929–1933: Walter Knight-Adkin
- 1933–1935: Charles Peshall
- 1935 – 4 October 1938 (retd): Arthur Gilbertson
- 1938–1943: Thomas Crick
- 1943–1947: John Wilson
- 1947 – 15 May 1952: Leonard Coulshaw
- 1952–1956: Noel Chamberlain
- 1956–1960: Darrell Bunt
- 1960 – 15 March 1963 (retd): John Armstrong
- 15 May 1963 – 18 March 1966 (retd): Raymond Richardson
- 18 March 1966 – 6 May 1969: Christopher Prior
- 8 April 1969 – 9 June 1972 (retd): Ambrose Weekes
- 14 April 1972 – 1975: Chandos Morgan
- 4 December 1975 – 1980: Basil O'Ferrall
- 28 March 1980 – 1984: Raymond Roberts
- 11 June 1984 – 1989: Noël Jones
- 1989–1994: Michael Henley
- 1994–1997: Michael Bucks
- 1997–1999: Simon Golding
- 1999–2000: Charles Stewart
- 2000–2002: Simon Golding
- 2002–2006: Barry Hammett
- 2006–2010: John Green
- 2010–2014: Scott J. Brown
- 2014–2018: Ian Wheatley
- 2018–2021: Martyn Gough
- 2021–2025: Andrew Hillier
- 2025 - Present: Mark Davidson

== See also ==
- Royal Air Force Chaplains Branch
- Royal Army Chaplains' Department
