= John Cawston =

British Anglican priest (1824–1900)

John Cawston (1824– 3 March 1900) was a Church of England priest and Royal Navy chaplain. He was Chaplain of the Fleet, serving from 1876 to 1882.

Cawston was the only son of Rev. A. W. Cawston, and was educated at St David's College, Lampeter. He was ordained deacon in 1847 and priest in 1848. After curacies at St Paul, Newport, Wales and St. Michael and All Angels, Great Torrington he began his long association with the Royal Navy in 1853. He served in Crimea and Turkey, where he was on board HMS Bellerophon during the bombardment of Sevastopol in 1854–55. Following time in Mexico, he served on HMS Centaur for an expedition in the Baltic, and later served in the West Indies before his time as head of the service. He was an Honorary Chaplain to the Queen.

He died at his home in Blackheath Park on 3 March 1900. His son, also John Cawston, was Comptroller of the Royal Mint from 1917 to 1921.
