= Darrell Bunt =

British Anglican priest and Navy chaplain (1902–1977)

The Venerable Darrell Bunt CB OBE QHC
- Born: Frederick Darrell Bunt; 3 July 1902
- Died: 31 October 1977 (aged 75)
- Allegiance: United Kingdom
- Branch: Royal Navy
- Education: City of London School; St Chad's College, Durham

Frederick Darrell Bunt CB OBE QHC (3 July 1902 – 31 October 1977) was Chaplain of the Fleet and Archdeacon of the Royal Navy from 1956 to 1960.

Educated at the City of London School and St Chad's College, Durham, Bunt was ordained in 1927. After curacies St Luke's, Victoria Docks and St Augustine's, Wembley Park he became a Chaplain in the Royal Navy. Amongst others he served HMS President (as Chaplain to Leonard Coulshaw, the Chaplain of the Fleet), HMS Excellent, HMS Suffolk, the RN College at Dartmouth and HM Dockyard, Portsmouth before becoming head of the service. An Honorary Chaplain to the Queen, he died on 31 October 1977.

Church of England titles
Preceded by Noel Chamberlain	Chaplain of the Fleet; 1956 –1960	Succeeded by John Armstrong
