= William Guise-Tucker =

British priest (1812–1885)

William Guise Tucker, RN, B.A., (12 May 1812 – 17 January 1885) was a Church of England priest and Royal Navy chaplain. He was the inaugural Chaplain of the Fleet, serving from 1865 to 1871.

He was educated at Peterhouse, Cambridge. He graduated in 1834, then served as curate at St Mary's and mathematics tutor at Ham House School, (owned by his father, John), both in Charlton King's. He was ordained deacon in 1835 and priest in 1836. After a curacy at Springfield, Essex, he was a Naval chaplain for 36 years, serving aboard HMS Revenge, HMS Albion and HMS Ceylon; at HM Dockyard, Malta; in Canada; at RNH Haslar; and Greenwich Hospital, London.

Between 1850 and 1853 he served as a missionary near Toronto, Canada.

He died on 17 January 1885 at Torquay, Devon, where he had been staying for his health. He was at the time the vicar of Ramsey, Essex, where he had been the incumbent since 1872. He and his wife are buried near Greenwich in what is now called the Pleasance Cemetery, (formerly the Royal Hospital Cemetery), near Charlton station.

== Family ==
William Guise Tucker was the son of Rev. John Tucker and his wife Mary Ann (née Kinsman). He was baptised on 12 January 1813 at Moretonhampstead, Devon, England. On the 1st of Feb 1845 he married Sarah Ellen Humphris (1822–1899) in St. Mary's Church Charlton Kings, Cheltenham. The book 'Recollections of a Chaplain in the Royal Navy' was compiled and edited by his widow and published in 1886. Their son was Maj. Gen. William Guise Tucker RMA., C.B. (29 January 1850 – 6 December 1906).
