= Charles Peshall =

Church of England priest and Royal Navy chaplain

Charles John Eyre Peshall, CBE, DSO, KHC (1881–1957) was a Church of England priest and former Royal Navy chaplain. He was Chaplain of the Fleet, director general of the Naval Chaplaincy Service and archdeacon for the Royal Navy from 1933 to 1935.

Peshall was born in Oldberrow, Warwickshire, educated at Haileybury and Imperial Service College and Pembroke College, Cambridge. He was ordained deacon in 1904, and priest in 1906. After curacies at Atherstone and Tor Mohun he served as a naval chaplain from 1908 to 1935. He was also an Honorary Chaplain to the King from 1934 to 1935. He was made Commander of the Order of the British Empire (CBE) in the 1935 New Year Honours.

He died on 18 October 1957.
