= Thomas Goss =

Thomas Ashworth Goss was an Anglican priest.

He was born on 27 July 1912 and educated at Shardlow Hall, Aldenham and the University of St Andrews. He was ordained in 1938 and began his ecclesiastical career with a curacy at Frodingham, after which he became a chaplain in the Royal Air Force Volunteer Reserve. He was a Japanese prisoner of war from 1942 to 1945. When peace returned he became vicar of Sutton Le Marsh until 1951, when he returned to the RAF, serving until 1967. An Honorary Chaplain to the Queen, he was Dean of Jersey from 1971 to 1985. He died on 10 December 1997.

== Notes and references ==
Church of England titles
Preceded by Alan Stanley Giles	Dean of Jersey; 1971–1985	Succeeded by Basil Arthur O'Ferrall
