= Alan Giles (priest) =

Anglican priest (1902–1975)

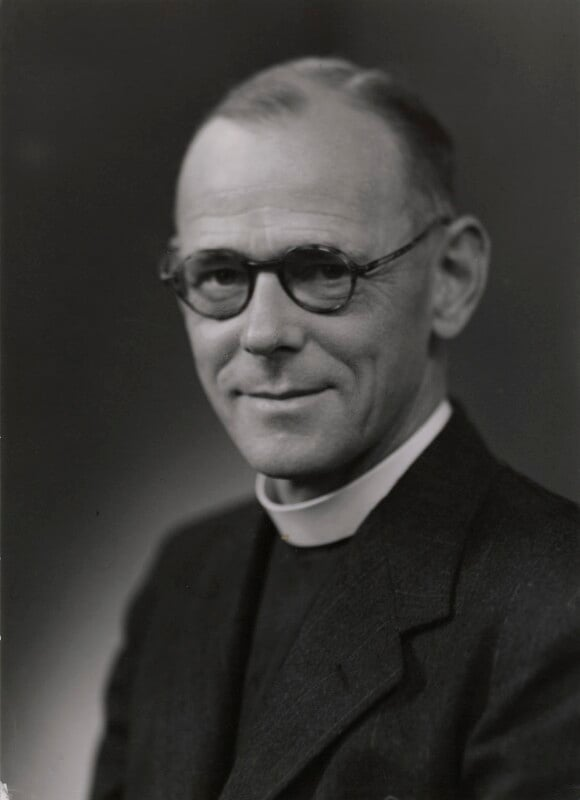
- Giles in 1950
- Born: 28 May 1902; United Kingdom
- Died: 26 May 1975 (aged 72)
- Occupation: Priest

The Venerable Alan Stanley Giles CB CBE QHC (28 May 1902 – 26 March 1975) was an eminent Anglican priest in the second half of the 20th century.

He was born into an ecclesiastical family and educated at Manchester Grammar School and The Queen's College, Oxford. He was ordained in 1932 and began his career as Curate of St Ebbe's, Oxford and Chaplain of Christ Church. From 1934 to 1959 he was an RAF Chaplain, rising through the service to become its Archdeacon (Chaplain-in-Chief) from 1953. He was taken prisoner of war on 8 March 1942 and held on Java by the Japanese occupying forces.

An Honorary Chaplain to the King then Queen, he was Dean of Jersey from 1959 to 1970.

== Notes and references ==
Military offices
Preceded by Leslie Wright	Chaplain-in-Chief of the RAF; 1953–1959	Succeeded by Francis William Cocks
Church of England titles
Preceded by Matthew Le Marinel	Dean of Jersey; 1959–1970	Succeeded by Thomas Ashworth Goss
