= Simon Golding =

British priest (born 1946)

Simon Jefferies Golding, CBE, QHC (born 30 March 1946) is a Church of England priest and former Royal Navy chaplain. He was Chaplain of the Fleet, Director General of the Naval Chaplaincy Service and Archdeacon for the Royal Navy from 2000 to 2002.

He was educated at HMS Conway Merchant Navy Cadet School and Lincoln Theological College. He was a Navigation officer in the Merchant Navy then a lieutenant in the Royal Naval Reserve. He was ordained deacon in 1974, and priest in 1976. After a curacy at St Cuthbert, Wilton he was a Naval Chaplain from 1977 to 2002. He was also an Honorary Chaplain to the Queen from 1997 to 2002.
