= Arthur Gilbertson =

British priest (1883–1964)

Arthur Deane Gilbertson, CB OBE (31 August 1883 – 30 January 1964) was a Church of England priest and former Royal Navy chaplain. He was Chaplain of the Fleet, Director General of the Naval Chaplaincy Service, Archdeacon for the Royal Navy and an Honorary Chaplain to the King from 1935 to 1938.

He was educated at Blundell's School; Keble College, Oxford; and Wells Theological College. He was ordained deacon in 1906, and priest in 1907 After a curacy at Boston, Lincolnshire he was a Naval Chaplain from 1909 to 1938. After that he was the Resident Chaplain of the Royal Merchant Navy School, Vicar of West Hoathly and finally of Kempsey.
