= Martyn Gough =

British priest (1966–2023)

The Venerable Martyn Gough
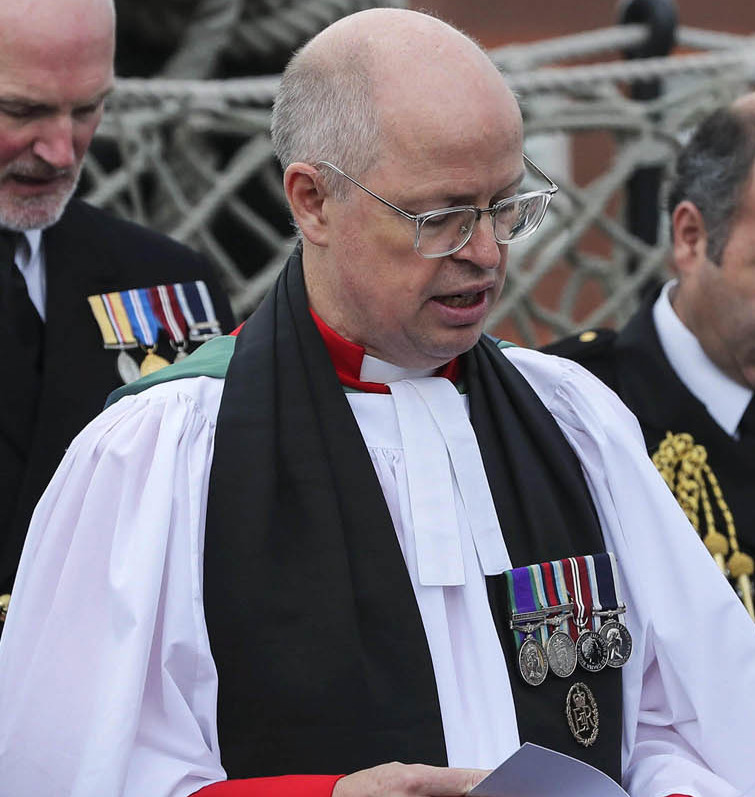
- Gough in 2019
- Born: 21 April 1966
- Died: 28 April 2023 (aged 57)
- Military career
- Allegiance: United Kingdom
- Branch: Royal Navy
- Service years: 1998 to 2021
- Commands: Royal Navy Chaplaincy Service

Martyn John Gough (21 April 1966 – 28 April 2023) was a British Anglican priest, who served as a military chaplain and was Chaplain of the Fleet and Archdeacon for the Royal Navy from 2018 until his retirement in 2021. At the time of his death he held the voluntary position of National Chaplain to the Royal British Legion.

== Early life and education ==
Gough was born on 21 April 1966 in Aberdare, Glamorgan, Wales. He was educated at Aberdare High School, an all-boys grammar school when he joined, which changed to an all-boys comprehensive school from 1978, the start of his second year. He studied at the University of Wales, Cardiff, graduating with a Bachelor of Theology (BTh) degree in 1987. From 1988 to 1990, he trained for ordination at St Stephen's House, Oxford. During this time, he completed the Oxford postgraduate certificate in theology. He later continued his studies and was awarded a Master of Arts (MA) degree by the University of Wales, Lampeter in 2005.

== Ordained ministry ==
Gough was ordained in the Church in Wales as a deacon in 1990 and as a priest in 1991. He served in the Diocese of Llandaff in Wales, and in the Church of England's Diocese in Europe. He served curacies at St Theodore's Church, Port Talbot from 1990 to 1992, and then, from 1992 to 1994, at St Margaret's Church, Roath in Cardiff. In 1995, he moved to the Diocese of Gibraltar in Europe and served as an assistant chaplain in Milan.

Gough joined the Royal Navy in September 1998. He began his navy career at HMNB Devonport and served on board the Type 22 frigate flotilla. He was then posted to HMS Invincible, serving at sea as its chaplain and also accompanying Queen Elizabeth II when she visited the ship in 2004. He held various appointments relating to fostering vocations: he was a vocations advisor from 2007 to 2014, and served as assistant director of ordinands (2007–09) and then director of ordinands for the Royal Navy (2009–14). He was secretary of the Armed Forces Synod from 2012 to 2016. He was posted to Afghanistan as a senior chaplain during 2013 and 2014.

Gough was Deputy Chaplain of the Fleet from 2014 to 2018. In October 2018, he was awarded the Naval Long Service and Good Conduct Medal (LS&GCM) in recognition of 15 years' service in the Royal Navy: this reflected the change in regulations in 2016 that allowed for regular officers to be awarded the LS&GCM. He served as Chaplain of the Fleet, the most senior chaplain in the Royal Navy, from 2018 until his retirement in 2021. He was additionally Archdeacon for the Royal Navy, the most senior Anglican navy chaplain and a member of the General Synod of the Church of England. He was an Honorary Chaplain to The Queen (QHC) from 2018 to 2021, and was made an Honorary canon of Portsmouth Cathedral in June 2020.

Following his retirement from the Royal Navy in 2021, Gough held permission to officiate in the Diocese of Salisbury. He had intended to return to full-time ministry but "Church of England's desk-officers were wary of a talented clergyman with senior leadership experience who had not risen through their own internal-preferment structures". The See of Swansea and Brecon in the Church in Wales became vacant in 2021, but he declined to have his name put forward for election. He also became the National Chaplain to the Royal British Legion, and officiated at the Festival of Remembrance held at the Royal Albert Hall on 14 November 2021.

== Personal life ==
Gough was married, and had two children.

Gough had been diagnosed with cancer in late 2022. He died on 28 April 2023, at the age of 57.
