= Noel Chamberlain =

The Rt Rev Frank Noel Chamberlain CB AKC (25 December 1900 – 17 July 1975) was Bishop of Trinidad and Tobago from 1956 until 1961. He was born on 25 December 1900 and educated at The Haberdashers' Aske's Boys' School, an independent school in Elstree in Hertfordshire and King's College London. After graduation, he was ordained in 1926 and began his ecclesiastical career with a curacy at the Eton Mission, Hackney Wick. From 1928 until 1956 he was a Royal Naval Chaplain eventually rising to be Chaplain of the Fleet. In 1957 he was elevated to the episcopate as Bishop of Trinidad and Tobago. Retiring to Portsmouth in 1961 he continued to serve the church as an assistant bishop within the Diocese until his death on 17 July 1975.

Church of England titles
Preceded by Leonard Coulshaw	Chaplain of the Fleet; 1951 –1956	Succeeded by Frederick Darrell Bunt
Preceded by Douglas John Wilson	Bishop of Trinidad; 1956–1961	Succeeded by William James Hughes
