= Charles Ingles =

English priest (1869–1954)

Charles William Chamberlayne Ingles (25 January 1869 – 18 December 1954) was a Church of England priest and Royal Navy chaplain. He was the Chaplain of the Fleet and Archdeacon of the Royal Navy, serving from 1917 to 1924.

Ingles was born at Blackheath, Kent and educated at Jesus College, Cambridge. He was ordained in 1892 and began his ecclesiastical career with a curacy at St Matthew, Exeter. He then served with the Navy from 1896 to 1924. He was an Honorary Chaplain to the King from 1923; and Rector of Cheddon Fitzpaine from 1924. to 1936.
