= Michael Bucks =

English priest (1940–1997)

Michael William Bucks (2 June 1940 – 20 July 1997) was a Church of England priest who served as Royal Navy chaplain. He was Chaplain of the Fleet, Director General of the Naval Chaplaincy Service and Archdeacon for the Royal Navy from 1993 until shortly before his death.

Bucks was educated at Rossall School and King's College London. He was ordained deacon in 1964, and priest in 1966. After a curacy in Workington he was a Naval Chaplain from 1969 to 1997. He was also an Honorary Chaplain to the Queen from 1994 to 1997.
