= Matthew Le Marinel =

Matthew Le Marinel (18 July 1883 – 22 January 1963) was a Jersey Anglican clergyman, who became Dean of Jersey.

Le Marinel was born in Saint Helier and educated at Victoria College, Jersey, Elizabeth College, Guernsey and Jesus College, Oxford before training for ordination as an Anglican priest at St Stephen's House, Oxford. After ordination, he served as vicar of St Mary Brookfield, Dartmouth Park (1909–1927) and St Matthew's, Oakley Square, becoming Dean of Jersey (head of the Anglican church in Jersey) in 1937 and rector of the Parish Church of St Helier (the civic church of Jersey) in 1938. He was made an honorary canon of Winchester Cathedral in 1944.

During the Second World War, when Jersey was occupied by Nazi forces, Le Marinel made a point of not resorting to the black market and lost a large amount of weight as a result. He stood down as Rector in 1958 and as Dean in 1959. He died in Saint Helier in Jersey on 22 January 1963, aged 79.

Church of England titles
Preceded by Samuel Falle	Dean of Jersey; 1937–1959	Succeeded by Alan Giles
