= Raymond Richardson =

English priest (1909–1968)

Raymond William Richardson, CB, QHC (16 October 1909 – 11 August 1968) was a Church of England priest and former Royal Navy chaplain. He was Chaplain of the Fleet, Director General of the Naval Chaplaincy Service and Archdeacon for the Royal Navy from 1963 to 1966.

The son of The Rev William Archibald Richardson, sometime incumbent of St. Peter's Church, Ennisnag, Kilkenny, Richardson was educated at Magdalen College School, Oxford and Trinity College, Dublin. He was ordained deacon in 1935 and priest in 1936. He served curacies at Ardamine and Queenstown. He married Jocelyn Carroll in 1939: they had three sons. As a Naval chaplain he served aboard HMS Victory, HMS Resolution, HMS Osprey, HMS Swiftsure, HMS Heron, HMS Gannet, HMS Ocean, HMS Condor, HMS Peregrine, HMS Victorious, HMS Vernon and then at HM Dockyard, Portsmouth.
