= Dean of Jersey =

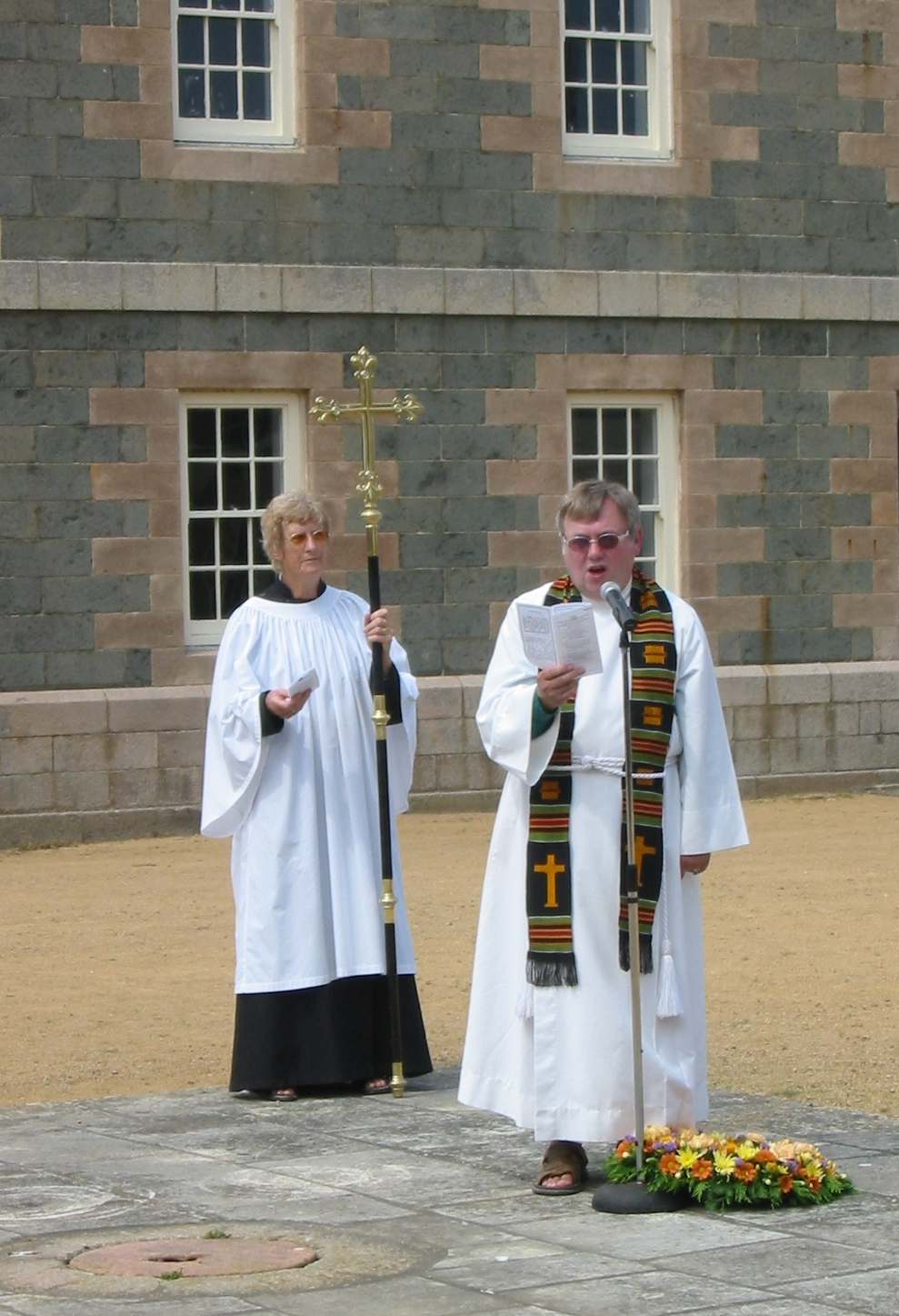
The former Dean of Jersey, Bob Key, leading the service at Elizabeth Castle during the annual Saint Helier Day pilgrimage, 2007

The Dean of Jersey is the leader of the Church of England in Jersey. He is ex officio a member of the States of Jersey, although since the constitutional reforms of 1948 the Dean may not take part in parliamentary votes. The Dean acts as the chaplain of the States Assembly and may speak in debates on any matter.

The Dean is appointed by the Crown by means of letters patent and sworn into that office by Jersey's Royal Court. The Dean also serves as rector of one of the Parishes of Jersey and is instituted and inducted in that office by the Bishop of Winchester. Since 1784 it has been customary (but not obligatory) for the Dean to also be the rector of the Parish Church of St Helier, but this has not always been the case. For example, William Corbet Le Breton, father of Lillie Langtry, was rector of Saint Saviour at the time he became Dean, though transferred to St Helier in 1875.

Since 1661, the Dean of Jersey has a seal of pointed ellipse type. The arms of the deanery impale those of each individual (or alternatively a monogram).

The Dean of Jersey presides over the ecclesiastical court.

== List of deans ==
From	To	Dean of Jersey
1620	1645	David Bandinel
1645	1661	vacant
1661	1671	Philip Le Couteur
1672	1714	Clement Le Couteur
1714	1728	Thomas Le Breton
1729	1775	Francis Payn
1775	1802	Francis Le Breton
1802	1823	Edouard Dupré
1823	1837	Corbet Hue
1838	1844	Francis Jeune
1850	1883	William Corbet Le Breton
1888	1906	George Orange Balleine
1906	1937	Samuel Falle
1937	1959	Matthew Le Marinel
1959	1971	Alan Stanley Giles
1971	1985	Thomas Goss
1985	1993	Basil O'Ferrall
1993	2005	John Seaford
2005	2017	Bob Key
2017	Present	Mike Keirle

== See also ==
- Dean of Guernsey

== Bibliography ==
- Customs, Ceremonies & Traditions of the Channel Islands, Lemprière, 1976, ISBN 0-7091-5842-4
