= John Seaford =

John Nicholas Shtetinin Seaford (born 12 September 1939) is a retired Anglican priest.

He was educated at Radley and Durham University and ordained in 1969. After curacies in Enfield and Winchester he held incumbencies at Chilworth, North Baddesley, Highcliffe and Hinton Admiral before becoming Dean of Jersey and Rector of St Helier, posts he held from 1993 to his retirement in 2005.
