= George Orange Balleine =

Jersey clergyman

George Orange Balleine (31 October 1842 – 29 March 1906) was Dean of Jersey from 1888 until his death.

He was born in St Helier. His father was George Balleine, a merchant, and his mother was Marie, daughter of Jean Orange. He was educated at Victoria College, Jersey, and The Queen's College, Oxford from 1861–1865, where he gained a double first in 1865. He was a Fellow of Queens' from 1865–1869, and was ordained in 1867.

He was Rector of Bletchingdon near Oxford from 1868–1885, then Rector of Weyhill, Hampshire from 1885–1888. He then became Dean of Jersey and Rector of St Helier.

Balleine married Florence Gardener (1843–1894) on 20 October 1868 at Ash. They had four sons and two daughters. George Reginald, Robert Wilfred and Austen Humphrey all joined the church; Cuthbert Francis became a Captain in the Rifle Brigade and was killed in the First World War. His daughters were Estelle Marguerite and Hilda Catherine Mary.

He is buried at St Saviour's Church, Jersey.
