= George Reginald Balleine =

George Reginald Balleine (1 April 1873 – 2 January 1966) was a prominent historian and writer in the Island of Jersey.

== Biography ==
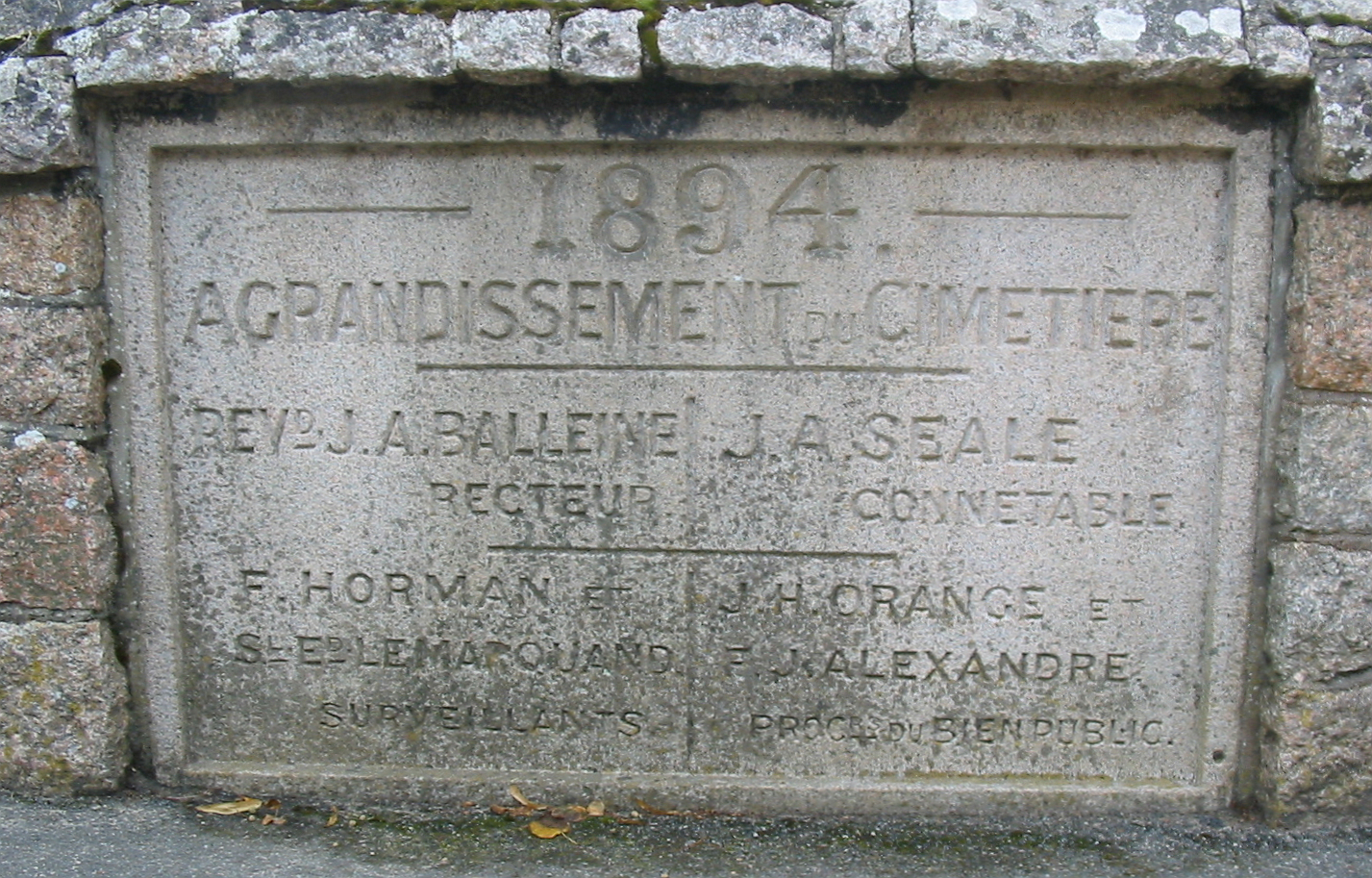
Memory plaque

George Reginald Balleine was born in Bletchingdon, Oxfordshire. His father was George Orange Balleine, Dean of Jersey. His brothers were Robert Wilfred Balleine, Cuthbert Francis Balleine, and Austen Humphrey Balleine. He was educated by his father at home until 1885, when he went to stay with his grandfather in Jersey. There he attended the Grammar School at St Aubin until 1886, when he went to Victoria College. During his time there he gained the Queen's History Prize. He left in 1891, going to The Queen's College, Oxford, and gaining a 2nd class degree in Modern History.

In 1886, he was ordained a deacon in the Church of England, and the 1897, a priest. He was Curate at St Mary's Whitechapel, then St Paul's, Penge. He became the Metropolitan Secretary to the Church Pastoral Aid Society in 1904, the Vicar of St James, Bermondsey in 1908. In 1925, he was also appointed Rural Dean of Bermondsey. He remained there until his retirement in 1938, when he returned to Jersey to property inherited from his uncle. During the German Occupation, he was honorary librarian at the Société Jersiaise, curate at St Aubin on the Hill church, and Ministre Desservant at St Brelade's Church on the death of his cousin, the Rev. J.A. Balleine, in 1942, in which position he remained for the duration of the war.

He died in 1966. His ashes were interred in St Brelade's Churchyard.

== Writings ==
Balleine's writings were extensive, and mirrored his interests in history, and the evangelical party of the Church of England.

=== Theological ===
Despite his evangelical roots, he was no fundamentalist, taking a very liberal position on the miracle stories of the New Testament. Writing (in Simon Whom he Surnamed Peter) of the feeding of the five thousand that "where the bread came from, no one can say, but it seems unlikely that it was supernaturally multiplied", and of Jesus walking on the water, he takes it that the Fourth Gospel tells of Jesus walking by the sea, the story changing in the telling.

- Simon Whom He Surnamed Peter
- The Layman's History of the Church of England
- A History of the Evangelical Party in the Church of England
- Sing with Understanding
- Past Finding Out (The Story of Joanna Southcott)

=== Sunday School ===
During the period 1910-1940, he wrote and published a comprehensive cycle of parish education manuals that could sustain Sunday schools for years:

- The Young Churchman: Lessons for the Sundays of the Church’s Year
- The Goodly Fellowship: 52 Lessons on the Prophets of Israel and Judah from the Days of Samuel
- Lessons from the Life of Christ
- What Jesus Said
- The Commands of Christ
- Lessons on the Acts of the Apostles
- Lessons on the Creed
- Saints and Holy Days
- Children of the Church: A Year’s Lessons on the Catechism
- Christianity in Action: 52 Lessons in Christian Ethics
- Lessons on the Boys and Girls of the Bible

=== Jersey History ===
His knowledge of Jersey history, gleaned from his time as Honorary Librarian for the Société Jersiaise, was extensive. However, his reliance upon the documents available at the time have led to weaknesses in some areas. These are notably his 1939 article on Witchcraft in Jersey (ABSB), where he draws heavily upon the now discredited ideas of Margaret Murray in his selection and presentation, and on the Reformation in Jersey, where historian Jason St. John Nicolle has criticised his position as oversimplifying the complexities of that period. Nevertheless, his work has provided a solid bedrock for later historians of the Island to build upon, and his Biographical Dictionary of Jersey remains unsurpassed for its depth of research. His writing is always readable, lucid and clear.

- Articles in the Annual Bulletin of the Société Jersiaise (ABSJ)
- Articles in The Pilot Magazine
- A Biographical Dictionary of Jersey
- The Bailiwick of Jersey
- A History of Jersey
- The Tragedy of Philippe d'Auvergne
- All for the King: The Life Story of Sir George Carteret (1609–1680)

== Bibliography ==
- Victoria College Register, 1852 to 1929
- A Biographical Dictionary of Jersey, Volume 2, Francis Corbet
- Reformation and Society in Guernsey, D.M. Ogier
- International Politics and the Establishment of Presbyterianism in the Channel Islands: The Coutances Connection, C.S.L. Davies
- Religion, History and G.R. Balleine: The Reformation in Jersey, by Revd. J. St. John Nicolle, The Pilot
- The Reformation in Jersey: The Process of Change over Two centuries, Revd. J. St. John Nicolle
- The Chroniques de Jersey in the light of contemporary documents, BSJ, AJ Eagleston
