= Mark Hiddesley =

Anglican bishop of Sodor and Man 1755 - 1772

The Right Reverend Mark Hildesley
- Bishop of Sodor and Man
- Diocese: Diocese of Sodor and Man
- In office: 1755–1772 (death)
- Predecessor: Thomas Wilson
- Successor: Richard Richmond

Personal details
- Born: 9 December 1698
- Died: 7 December 1772 (aged 74)
- Denomination: Anglican
- Spouse: Elizabeth Hoker
- Education: Charterhouse School; Trinity College, Cambridge

Mark Hiddesley or Hildesley (9 December 1698 – 7 December 1772) was an Anglican churchman. He served as vicar of Hitchin in Hertfordshire and later as Bishop of Sodor and Man between 1755 and 1772, where he encouraged Bible translations into Manx and collected from the local oral tradition lays in the Manx language from the Fenian Cycle of Celtic Mythology.

== Early life ==
Born at Murston in Kent, on 9 December 1698, he was the eldest surviving son of Mark Hildesley, rector of Murston and also vicar of Sittingbourne from 1705. In 1710 the father became rector of Houghton, which he held with the chapel of Witton or Wyton All Saints, Huntingdonshire. About then Mark Hildesley the son was sent to Charterhouse School, London, where John Jortin was a schoolfellow. At the age of nineteen he was moved to Trinity College, Cambridge, and graduated B.A. in 1720, and M.A. in 1724. He was elected a Fellow of his college in October 1723, and about the same time was appointed steward.

== Parish priest ==
Hildesley had been ordained deacon in 1722, and on 29 March 1723 Lord Cobham appointed him one of his domestic chaplains. In February 1725 he was nominated a preacher at Whitehall by Edmund Gibson, bishop of London. From 1725 till the end of 1729 he was curate of Yelling, Huntingdonshire. In February 1731 he was presented to the college vicarage of Hitchin, Hertfordshire, and married in the same year. He improved the vicarage house, and took six pupils as boarders. On 18 January 1734 he was appointed chaplain to Henry St John, Viscount Bolingbroke; in October 1735 rector of Holwell in Bedfordshire, and on 10 May 1742 chaplain to John St John, 2nd Viscount St John.

In 1733 Hildesley became an honorary member of the Spalding Gentlemen's Society. On 20 February 1754 he was collated to the prebend of Marston St. Lawrence in Lincoln Cathedral.

== Bishop ==
Hildesley's tenure of the rectory of Holwell extended over thirty-two years (1735–67), and his work there recommended him to the notice of James Murray, 2nd Duke of Atholl, the Lord of Mann, who nominated him to the see of Sodor and Man. After being created D.D. at Lambeth by Archbishop Thomas Herring on 7 April 1755 he was consecrated in Whitehall Chapel on the 27th, and on 6 August following was installed in the cathedral of St. German, Peel Castle, Isle of Man. He retained the rectory of Holwell in commendam until 1767, when he was presented by Bishop Richard Trevor to the mastership of Christ's Hospital at Sherburn, near Durham.

Hildesley concentrated on providing his Manx flock with a complete version of the Bible in the Manx language. On 28 November 1772 he received the last portion of the work. He died of apoplexy on 7 December 1772. His wife, Elizabeth Hoker, whom he married in 1731, died without issue 27 February 1763.

== Works ==
Of 20,000 people in the Isle of Man, few in Hildesley's day knew English. A Manx translation of the New Testament had been begun by his predecessor Thomas Wilson. Hildesley himself learned Manx well enough to conduct the church services in it, but not perfectly. John Kelly made for him a grammar and dictionary. At first, with the support of the Society for Promoting Christian Knowledge, Hildesley printed the New Testament and the Book of Common Prayer, translated, under his direction, by the clergy of the diocese, as well as the Christian Monitor, John Lewis's Exposition of the Catechism, and Bishop Wilson's Form of Prayer for the use of the herring fishermen.

Regarding negative attitudes towards the Manx language, Hildesley complained to fellow Manx Bible translator Rev. Philip Moore that "this I believe, is the only country in the world, that is ashamed of, and even inclined to extirpate, if it could, its own native tongue".

With further assistance, about 1766 Hildesley' made arrangements for the translation of the Old Testament, dividing it into 24 parts. The names of the translators are in Weeden Butler's Life of Bishop Hildesley (pp. 252–6). The work was given for final revision to Philip Moore and John Kelly. The first volume of the translation was completed on 2 July 1771; the second volume was ready for the press on 6 April 1772; and all was finished and transcribed in December of the same year, at the time of the bishop's death. The work was printed at Whitehaven under the title of: Yn Vible Cashcrick: ny, yn Chenn Chonaant. Veih ny chied ghlaraghyn, dy kiaralagh chyndaït ayns Gailck; ta shen dy ghra, chengey ny mayrey Ellan Vannin. It was published in 1773. The second edition of the Manx scriptures was published at Whitehaven in 1775, and the last edition at London in 1819. In 1825 George Murray, bishop of Sodor and Man, informed the SPCK that the displacement of Manx by English in the Island removed the necessity of providing further copies of the Manx bible.

Hildesley was also author of an anonymous tract, Plain Instructions for Young Persons in the Principles of the Christian Religion; in six Conferences between a Minister and his Disciple; designed for the use of the Isle and Diocese of Mann. By a resident Clergyman, 2 parts, London, 1762, 1767.

== See also ==
- List of the Bishops of the Diocese of Sodor and Man
- List of Old Carthusians

Church of England titles
Preceded by Thomas Wilson	Bishop of Sodor and Man; 1755–1773	Succeeded by Richard Richmond
