= Manuela Soto Sosa =

Multidisciplinary artist

Manuela Soto Sosa (born February 8, 1991) is a Swiss-Uruguayan multidisciplinary artist. She is known for her work in tattoo, illustration, design, and art direction. In 2018, she designed the cover art for the single "When the party's over" by the American singer Billie Eilish.

== Early life ==
Manuela Soto Sosa was born in Yverdon-les-Bains, Switzerland to a Swiss mother and a Uruguayan political refugee father of Charrúa descent. She was raised in Lausanne, Switzerland where she studied illustration and started tattooing in 2010 at age 18.

== Career ==
=== Tattoo ===
Soto Sosa began her career as a tattoo artist in 2010 under the name "Soto Gang". Her artistic style is influenced by Japanese anime, Chicano fine line tattooing and an aesthetic from the 1990s and 2000s promoting self-love and empowerment. In 2018, V magazine described her as "The Cardi B of Tattoo Artistry". From 2014 to 2018 she went on a world tour tattooing in Europe, Asia and the United States. In 2018, she moved to Los Angeles, California and co-founded Sang Bleu LA, the third branch of the Sang Bleu tattoo studios. In the same year, she designed Billie Eilish's "When the party's over" single cover. Two years later, in 2020, she stepped down from her position as co-owner of Sang Bleu LA and opened Softflex, a multi-disciplinary creative studio located downtown Los Angeles.

=== Fashion ===
In 2019, Soto Sosa launched a clothing brand named Soto Worldwide. She has collaborated on capsule collections and merchandise design with Billie Eilish, Lil Miquela, Flossgloss, Sean Pablo's Paradise NYC.

== Art exhibitions ==
Date	Location	Gallery	Show
October 2020	Los Angeles, CA	New Image Art	"Part of who you are is who you will be"
October 2019	Paris, FR	Paris Internationale	Group show curated by "Sang Bleu"
July 2019	Zurich, CH	Lubov NYC x Mikro ZH	“6 Hours, 42 Minutes, 12 Seconds”
May 2018	New York City, NY	Lubov NYC	"Meant to be"
