= Bible translations into Manx =

The Bible was translated into the Manx language, a Gaelic language related to Irish and Scots Gaelic, in the 17th and 18th centuries.

== Early translations ==
The first extant translation of any part of the Bible into the Manx language was by John Phillips, the Bishop of Sodor and Man from 1604 until his death in 1633. He also translated the 1604 version of the Book of Common Prayer in 1610.

The printing of Prayers for the Poor Families was projected by Thomas Wilson, Bishop of Sodor and Man, in a memorandum of Whit-Sunday 1699, but this was not carried out until 30 May 1707, the date of issue of his Principles and Duties of Christianity ... in English and Manks, with short and plain directions and prayers. This was the first book published in Manx, and is often styled the Manx Catechism. It was followed in 1733, by A Further Instruction and A Short and Plain Instruction for the Lord's Supper. The Gospel of St. Matthew was translated with the help of his vicars-general in 1722, and published in 1748 under the sponsorship of Wilson's successor as bishop, Mark Hildesley (1755-1772). The remaining Gospels and the Acts were also translated into Manx under his supervision, but not published.

== The Manx Bible ==
The Bible was translated into Manx by a committee of clergy from the Isle of Man under the direction of Bishop Mark Hildesley. The New Testament appeared in 1767, and the Old Testament (including 2 books of the Apocrypha) in 1772 and the whole Bible as one volume in 1775.

Of 20,000 people in the Isle of Man, few in Hildesley's day knew English. A Manx translation of the New Testament had been begun by his predecessor Thomas Wilson Hildesley himself learned Manx well enough to conduct the church services in it, but not perfectly. John Kelly made for him a grammar and dictionary. At first, with the support of the Society for Promoting Christian Knowledge, Hildesley printed the New Testament and the Book of Common Prayer, translated, under his direction, by the clergy of the diocese, as well as the Christian Monitor, John Lewis's Exposition of the Catechism, and Bishop Wilson's Form of Prayer for the use of the herring fishermen.

With further assistance, around 1766, Hildesley made arrangements for the translation of the Old Testament, dividing it into 24 parts. The names of the translators are given in Weeden Butler's Life of Bishop Hildesley. The work was given for final revision to Philip Moore and John Kelly. The first volume of the translation was completed on 2 July 1771; the second volume was ready for the press on 6 April 1772; and all was finished and transcribed in December of the same year, at the time of the bishop's death. The work was printed at Whitehaven under the title of: Yn Vible Cashcrick: ny, yn Chenn Chonaant. Veih ny chied ghlaraghyn, dy kiaralagh chyndaït ayns Gailck; ta shen dy ghra, chengey ny mayrey Ellan Vannin. It was published in 1773. The second edition of the Manx scriptures was published as one volume at Whitehaven in 1775.

== Bible Society editions ==
The British and Foreign Bible Society edited the Manx Bible to produce an edition in 1819. An edition of the Manx New Testament was produced in 1810 which included footnotes. This was reprinted in 1815 and 1824. The Bible Society last printed any of the Manx Bible on paper when it produced the Gospel of John (Noo Ean) in 1936, which was a reproduction of the 1819 edition. This was reprinted in 1968 by the Manx Gaelic Society. In 1973 the Bible Society produced a booklet and exhibition to mark 200 years of the completion of the Manx Bible. The whole of the BFBS 1819 Bible was reproduced in 1979 by the Shearwater Press.

| Translation | Genesis 1:1–3 | John (Ean) 3:16 |
|---|---|---|
| British and Foreign Bible Society 1819 | Ayns y toshiaght chroo Jee niau as thalloo. As va'n thalloo gyn cummey, as feayn; as va dorraghys er eaghtyr y diunid: as ren spyrryd Yee gleashagh er eaghtyr ny ushtaghyn. As dooyrt Jee, Lhig da soilshey 've ayn; as va soilshey ayn. | Son lheid y ghraih shen hug Jee d'an theihll, dy dug eh e ynyrcan Vac v'er ny gheddyn, nagh jinnagh quoi-erbee chredjagh aynsyn cherraghtyn, agh yn vea ta dy bragh farraghtyn y chosney. |
