= Weeden Butler the younger =

English cleric and author

Weeden Butler the younger (1773–1831) was an English cleric and author.

== Life ==
He was the eldest son of the Rev. Weeden Butler (1742–1823), and George Butler was his brother; he was educated by his father. In 1790 he entered Sidney Sussex College, Cambridge, graduating B.A. in 1794, M.A. 1797. He was ordained deacon in 1796 and became curate at St. Michael, Crooked Lane in London; in 1797 he was ordained priest.

Butler became the afternoon lecturer of Charlotte Street Chapel in Pimlico; and evening lecturer of Brompton in 1811. He was presented to the rectory of Great Woolston, Buckinghamshire, in 1816.

After having for 19 years acted as classical assistant in his father's school, in Cheyne Walk, Chelsea, Butler took it over on his father's retirement in 1814. In that year Isambard Kingdom Brunel became a pupil there.

Butler died in Cheyne Walk on 28 June 1831.

== Works ==
Butler published:

- Bagatelles; or miscellaneous productions, consisting of Original Poetry and Translations, London, 1795
- Prospect of the Political Relations which subsist between the French Republic and the Helvetic Body, 1794, translated from the French of François-Rodolphe de Weiss, Coup-d'oeil sur les relations politiques entre la République française et le Corps Hélvetique (1793)
- The Wrongs of Unterwalden, 1799
- Zimao, the African, 1800 and 1807
- The Warning Voice. A Sermon Preached at Charlotte Street Chapel, Pimlico ... November 19, 1817 on the death of Princess Charlotte of Wales

== Family ==
Butler married Annabella Dundas Oswald in Chislehurst, Kent, in 1805. Their eldest son, Weeden, born 1806, another son, and three daughters survived into adulthood.

== Notes ==
Attribution

This article incorporates text from a publication now in the public domain: Stephen, Leslie, ed. (1886). "Butler, Weeden (1773-1831)". Dictionary of National Biography. Vol. 8. London: Smith, Elder & Co.
