= Thomas Faulkner (topographer) =

English bookseller and topographer

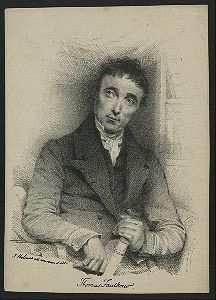
- Born: 10 April 1777; London, England
- Died: 26 May 1855 (aged 78); London, England
- Resting place: Brompton Cemetery
- Occupations: Topographer, writer, stationer and bookseller
- Known for: An Historical and Topographical Account of Chelsea and its Environs
- Relatives: Charles Cotton (great-great-great grandfather)

Thomas Faulkner (10 April 1777 – 26 May 1855) was an English bookseller and topographer of West London. He is known for three principal works that were to become standard 19th-century references for the localities of Chelsea, Fulham and Kensington. Faulkner was a member of the Société des Antiquaires de Normandie.

== Early life ==
Faulkner was born on 10 April 1777 in Fulham, London, to John Falkner, involved in the building trade in West London, and Elizabeth Charlotte Faulkner.

He branched out of the family business and, for many years, kept a small bookseller's and stationer's shop at the corner of Paradise Row, at the western end of the footpath running past Chelsea Hospital.

Without much formal education, he was an autodidact and acquired sufficient knowledge of French and Spanish to obtain employment as a translator.

== Literary career ==
His literary career began in October or November 1797 with pieces for the Gentleman's Magazine, to which he was to be an occasional contributor for over half a century. He was also a contributor to the series of the New Monthly Magazine.

In 1805 he published a Short Account of Chelsea Hospital, and in 1810 produced his first work, An Historical and Topographical Account of Chelsea and its Environs. With biographical anecdotes of illustrious and eminent persons who have resided in Chelsea during the three preceding centuries, published in London. It was dedicated to Brownlow North, bishop of Winchester, who then had an official residence in Chelsea. Faulkner is said to have been assisted in the compilation by the Rev. Weeden Butler the younger, a local schoolmaster. A second edition of the work, in two volumes and dedicated to the Hon. George Cadogan, appeared in 1829.

In 1813 Faulkner published his major work, An Historical and Topographical Account of the parish of Fulham, including the hamlet of Hammersmith, dedicated to John Randolph, then Bishop of London; and in 1820 his History and Antiquities of Kensington, with Biographical Anecdotes of Royal and Distinguished Personages, and a Descriptive Catalogue of the Pictures in the Palace from a survey taken by the late Benjamin West, P.R.A., by command of his Majesty. This work was dedicated to George IV.

In 1839 Faulkner published his History and Antiquities of Hammersmith, dedicated to Queen Victoria. In 1845, he followed this with his History and Antiquities of Brentford, Chiswick, and Ealing. Both these works contain biographical accounts of local notabilities of the three preceding centuries. His obituary notice in the Gentleman's Magazine for June 1855 contains a complete list of Faulkner's works, including several minor publications not in the British Museum Catalogue of Printed Books.

== Death ==
Faulkner died on 26 May 1855 aged 78 on Smith Street, Chelsea.
