= C. Violet Butler =

British social researcher and educator

Christina Violet Butler
- Born: 25 January 1884; Oxford, England
- Died: 19 May 1982 (aged 98); Oxford, England
- Other name: C. V. Butler
- Education: Society for Home Students, Somerville College, Oxford
- Occupations: Social researcher; Educator
- Notable work: Social Conditions in Oxford in 1912
- Father: Arthur Gray Butler

Christina Violet Butler (25 January 1884 – 19 May 1982) was a social researcher and educator active in Oxford. She was known for her 1912 study Social Conditions in Oxford which recorded the lives of working class citizens in the Edwardian city. She also taught economics, women's studies, and trained social workers in Oxford.

== Early life and education ==
Butler was born at 14 Norham Gardens, Oxford on 25 January 1884 and lived there until 1949. Her father, Arthur Gray Butler, was a law and history academic at Oriel College, Oxford. Her mother worked in charitable causes involving the moral welfare of women. Her aunt was feminist and social reformer Josephine Butler. Butler was home-schooled by her parents and governess until she was 14, after which point she attended Wycombe Abbey.

Butler studied modern history at Society for Home Students (later St Anne's College, Oxford) from 1903-1905 and was awarded a first-class degree, although this was not formally awarded as she was a woman. She also gained a teaching diploma at London University. In 1905, Butler gained early experience in research whilst helping her sister collect information and write sections of an article on industries for the Victoria County History. She embarked upon an economics diploma at Somerville College, Oxford in 1906-7, largely self-taught, but with mentoring from Sidney Ball and Francis Ysidro Edgeworth. She was awarded a distinction.

== Career ==
=== Early social work ===
Inspired by her interest in helping adolescents, Butler became an honorary secretary to the Council for the Industrial Advancement of Young People in Oxford, which encouraged school leavers to enter technical classes and skilled employment. Butler and her helpers visited the homes of around 400 boys throughout 1910-11 to talk about their lives after leaving school. She worked with the Women's Industrial Council to undertake national research on Domestic Work during 1910. The conclusions of her research do not call for an end to the class system on which domestic work is based, but focus on best practice and good employers.

Butler was involved with the Charity Organisation Society, and by 1910 was a member of the Oxford branch's Invalid and Crippled Children's sub-committee. She remained on the general committee until the collapse of the branch in 1922. Butler believed in mutual respect between classes and in the strength of a community. She argued that NGOs and the state should provide strong social support.

=== Social Conditions in Oxford ===
Social Conditions in Oxford is a survey conducted by Butler in 1912 in which she recorded the experiences of working-class citizens in Oxford. It was one of several provincial surveys inspired by Seebohm Rowntree's Poverty: a Study of Town Life (1901), the others being conducted in Norwich and Cambridge. It builds upon a previous article by Butler published in the Economic Review in 1910. Her aim with Social Conditions was to improve the conditions of poor people living in Oxford by encouraging volunteers and statutory workers to cooperate, centralising the support in the city. Social Conditions largely focussed on the lack of opportunities and high levels of casual work among teenagers in Oxford. Butler was less focussed on the structural causes of unemployment, instead believing that hard work could solve social issues.

Butler was responsible for the data collection, analysis, research, and production of the manuscript of Social Conditions. She drew from both qualitative and quantitative data, arguing that both were "equally dispensable". Part of her research involved conducting interviews with local people. She faced practical difficulties as a woman researcher and required chaperones to visit lectures and the library.

Butler later said of the study: "I am not proud at all of the book", citing its apparent lack of originality and patronising tone. However, both contemporary and later sources praised the study. The Athenaeum commended the personal aspect of Social Conditions, stating "the Oxford of her picture never ceases to be a city of living people." Brian Harrison wrote an essay in Traditions of social policy covering the history of the survey, describing it as "an unusual achievement, and an important document in its own right". The study provided Butler with academic credentials and she became an acting tutor in economics at St Anne's College from 1914–1945.

=== Barnett House ===
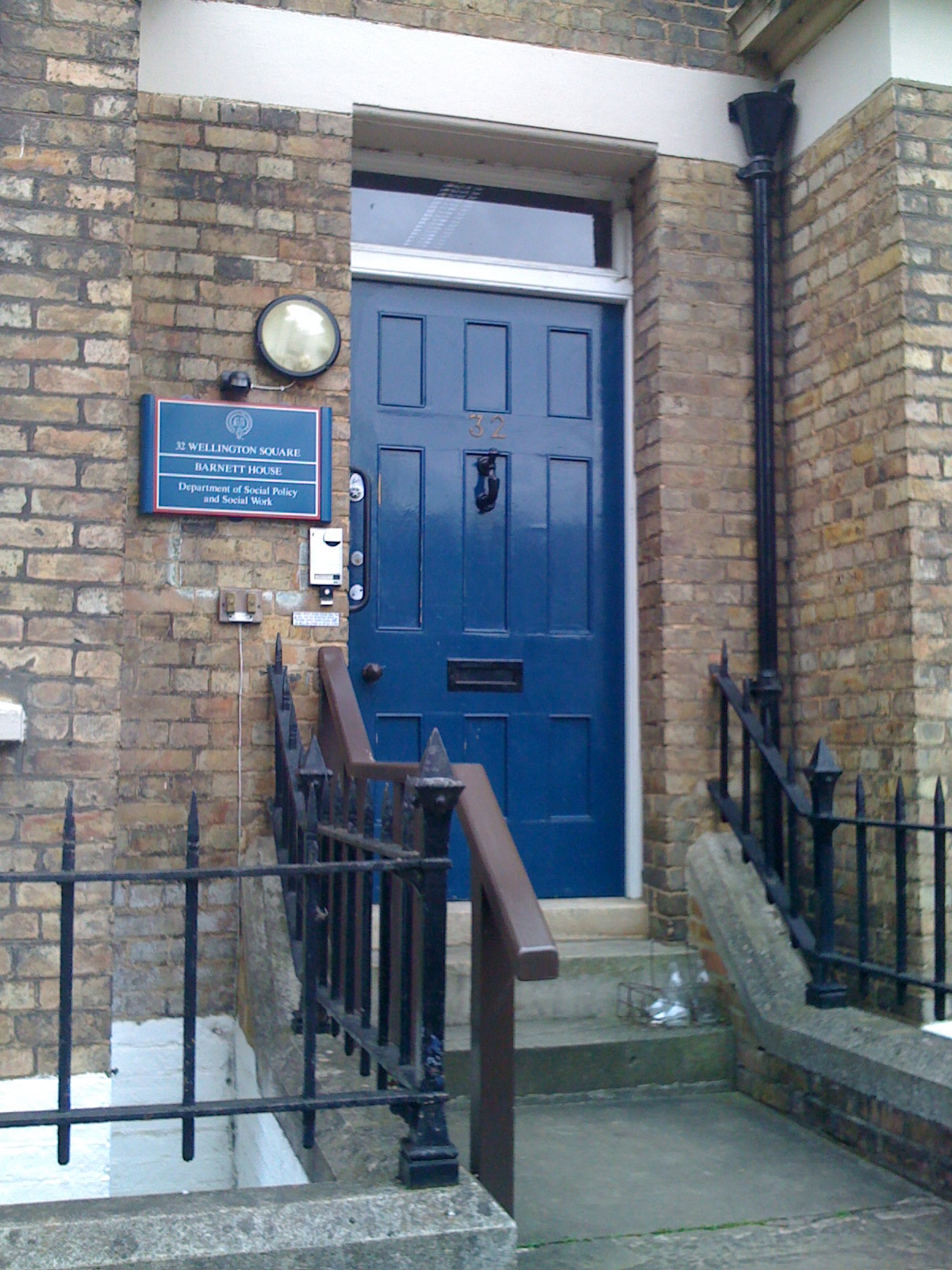
Exterior of Barnett House.

In 1914, Butler was part of the conception of Barnett House, a research centre in Oxford. She was tutor-secretary for women students and secretary for social training from 1919–1948. She was on Barnett House's council from 1920.

After the First World War, Harold Plunkett and the Carnegie UK Foundation helped Barnett House to undertake a rural regeneration project. Butler had piloted development of cooperation in the countryside and development of a scheme for village schoolteachers, recording her research approach in Village Survey making - an Oxfordshire Experiment in 1928. Through this work, Butler encouraged schoolchildren to become researchers into their own communities, collecting information and distributing it to the community. She also trained schoolteachers alongside her colleague, Miss Simpson.

She became director of the centre and remained in that role until 1946. Throughout all her time at Barnett House she was never paid. Today, Butler's name can be found on the door of Barnett House and her picture can be found on the wall.

=== Other voluntary work ===
Butler was active in juvenile clubs, playing fields, adult education and community centres, both locally and nationally. She retired after the Second World War but remained active in Oxford and maintained an interest in the development of post-war policy in the city.

== Legacy ==
As an educator in Oxford, Butler influenced the generations of social workers between 1914–1945. Many of her students went on to launch their own local projects across the UK, India, West Africa and Malaya. For Butler's ninetieth birthday, A. H. Halsey and his colleagues decided to put together a collection of essays on social policy in her honour: Traditions of social policy : essays in honour of Violet Butler. Brian Harrison recorded 3 oral history interviews with Butler in September, October and November of 1974, as part of the Suffrage Interviews project, titled Oral evidence on the suffragette and suffragist movements: the Brian Harrison interviews. The collection also contains an interview with her sister, Ruth Butler. Butler talks about her Oxford survey, Barnett House and the Lady Margaret Hall Settlement.

After Butler's death, British civil servant John Redcliffe-Maud, who had been taught by Butler in the 1930s, described her as "an outstanding example of the British volunteer". 14 Norham Gardens, where Butler was born, now has an Oxfordshire Blue Plaque in her honour.
