= Yverdon-les-Bains =

Place in Vaud, Switzerland

- Municipality
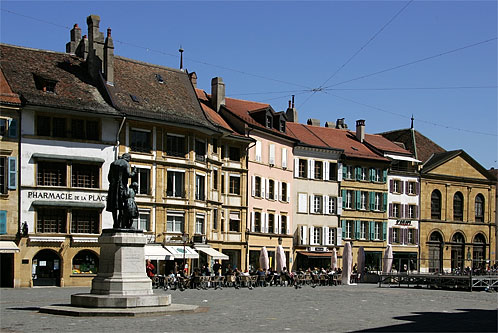

- Flag Coat of arms
- Location of Yverdon-les-Bains
- Location within Switzerland Location within Canton of Vaud
- Coordinates: 46°46.71′N 6°38.45′E
- Country: Switzerland
- Canton: Vaud
- District: Jura-Nord Vaudois

Government
  - Executive: Municipalité with 7 members
  - Mayor: Syndic (list); Pierre Dessemontet SPS/PSS (as of 2021)
  - Parliament: Conseil communal with 100 members

Area
  - Total: 13.49 km^{2} (5.21 sq mi)
- Elevation: 435 m (1,427 ft)

Population (December 2020)
  - Total: 29,955
  - Density: 2,221/km^{2} (5,751/sq mi)
- Time zone: UTC+01:00 (CET)
  - Summer (DST): UTC+02:00 (CEST)
- Postal code: 1400
- SFOS number: 5938
- ISO 3166 code: CH-VD
- Surrounded by: Belmont-sur-Yverdon, Cheseaux-Noréaz, Cuarny, Épendes, Grandson, Gressy, Montagny-près-Yverdon, Pomy, Treycovagnes
- Twin towns: Nogent-sur-Marne (France), Winterthur (Switzerland), Prokuplje (Serbia), Kagamino (Japan), Pontarlier (France), Collesano (Italy)
- Website: www.yverdon-les-bains.ch

Yverdon-les-Bains (French pronunciation: [ivɛʁdɔ̃ le bɛ̃]; lit. 'Yverdon-the-Baths'; Arpitan: Invèrdon), commonly known simply as Yverdon, is a municipality in the district of Jura-Nord vaudois of the canton of Vaud, Switzerland. It is the seat of the district. The population of Yverdon-les-Bains, as of December 2020, was 29,955, making it second-most populated municipality in Vaud.

Yverdon is located in the heart of a natural setting formed by the Jura Mountains, the plains of the Orbe, the hills of the Broye and Lake Neuchâtel. It was called Eburodunum and Ebredunum during the Roman era. It is known for its thermal springs – hence "les-Bains" in its name – and is an important regional centre for commerce and tourism.

It was awarded the Wakker Prize in 2009 for the way the city handled and developed the public areas and connected the old city with Lake Neuchâtel.

== History ==
The heights nearby Yverdon seem to have been settled at least since the Neolithic Age about 5000 BCE, as present archeological evidence shows. The town was at that time only a small market place, at the crossroads of terrestrial and fluvial communication ways. People began to settle, at first in temporary huts at the water-front, for fishers and merchants, then in permanent dwellings.

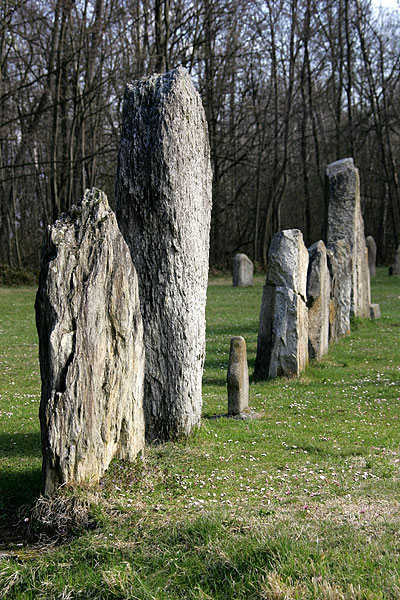
The stone rows in Yverdon-les-Bains (3000 B.C.E.)

The Celtic Helvetii are said to have been the first permanent settlers of Eburodunum (Celtic and Roman name of Yverdon), from about the 2nd century BCE.

About a century later, the Romans realized the commercial and strategic importance of this place: it controlled major routes such as Geneva-Avenches, connecting the Rhône and Rhine basins, as well as those of Rhone and Danube.

The imposing Castrum, or stronghold, called Castrum Ebredunense was the second largest in Switzerland and demonstrated the importance the Romans attached to Yverdon. The port served as naval base for the barges supplying the defensive positions along the Rhine, which marked the North-Eastern border of the Empire. Thus the Roman "Vicus" of Eburodunum developed into a prosperous urban centre. The sulphur springs were already used for a thermal spa, as attested by excavations. It is even possible that the Helvetii appreciated the beneficial effects of these waters.

=== The Castrum ===
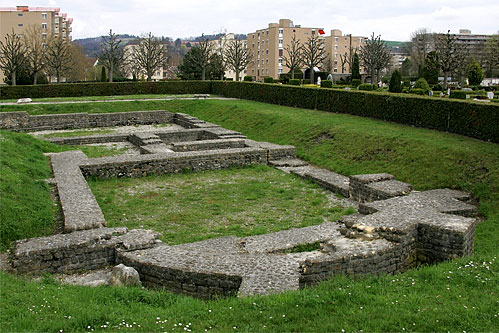
Castrum of Yverdon

About a century after the first invasions of the Alemanni, when the "Vicus" had been completely destroyed, the Romans built a large military stronghold (about 325 CE). It covered about 5 acres (20,000 m^{2}) and was protected by gigantic ramparts and 15 masonry towers (Castrum). The Barbarians invaded Italy in the 5th century, and threatened to assault Rome. In a last desperate effort to save the city, all troops stationed North of the Alps were ordered back to Italy. The garrison and the Roman administration had to abandon the Yverdon camp. The inhabitants of Eburodunum, up to then assigned to live beyond the ramparts, immediately took possession of the Castrum, using it for their own safety. Like this, Eburodunum-Yverdon survived the hard times, until the 15th century. The Castrum was noted in the Notitia Dignitatum (dated c. 420 CE).

=== Savoy era ===
With the lake receding, the ancient town confined to the Castrum had lost its strategic position: no more direct access to the port, or to the new trade routes alongshore.

When Peter II of Savoy gradually extended his rule over the Pays de Vaud (Land of Vaud), he managed to impose road tolls as well as port and fishing taxes. He founded the new town ("Ville Neuve") of Yverdon, defended by walls and a castle. Construction works were launched around 1259 and attracted many settlers.

=== Yverdon Castle ===
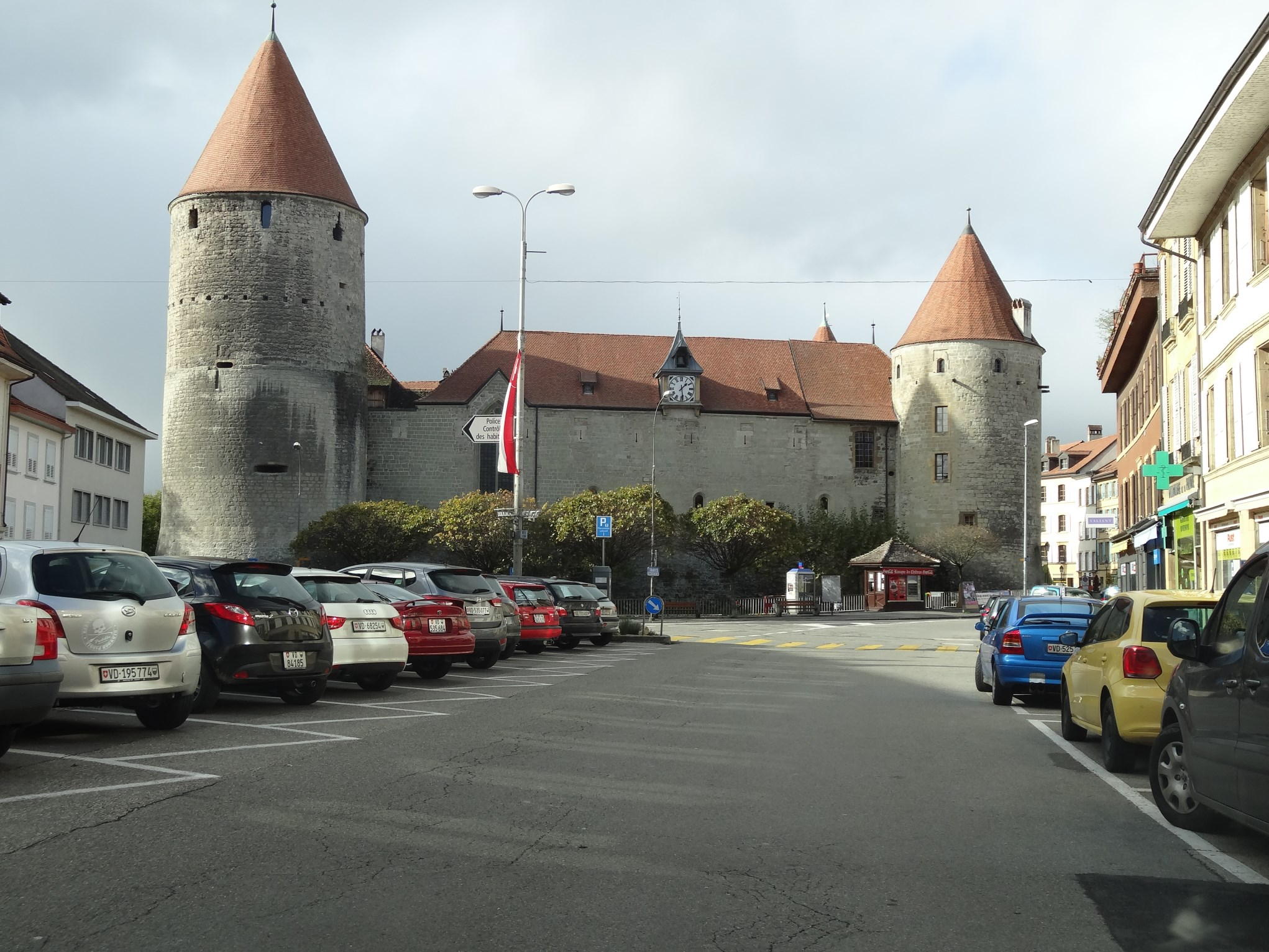
Yverdon Castle

The imposing main walls and their four towers were erected within a few years. The design of the castle followed the geometric characteristics used for castles set in plains, and had been planned by the young mason and architect Jacques de Saint-Georges. Jacques also planned Caernarvon Castle and built the castle Saint-Georges d'Espéranches, near Lyon.

Yverdon's castle used to be the residence of the castellans of the Savoy dynasty, until 1536, followed by the bailiffs of Bern state. In 1798, the Département du Léman became the castle's owner. The Département had been set up by the short-lived "Helvetian Republic" (1798–1803), imposed by Napoleon I.

A few years later, Yverdon acquired the castle, to entrust it to Johann Heinrich Pestalozzi and his institute. After 1838, the castle housed a public school. New classrooms were created, especially on the second floor: dividing walls were erected, additional windows changed the severe look of the castle's façade. After 1950, these classrooms were gradually abandoned; the last classes left in 1974. The original medieval structure was then restored. The castle is today a multi-purpose cultural centre, housing a regional museum, a theatre, various conference rooms and the oldest public library of French-speaking Switzerland, founded already in 1763. The library is now part of the castle museum, existing since 1830.

=== Bernese era (1536–1798) ===
The Savoy rulers granted bountiful franchise and liberties to the burghers of Yverdon. The township prospered during the two hundred years preceding the Burgundy wars.

The Bernese conquest followed. During the nearly three hundred years of Bernese occupation, economic life continued to thrive.

The 18th century proved to be one of Yverdon's most favorable periods, marked by cultural and economic highlights. Then a town of about 2.000 inhabitants, Yverdon became known as a spa, and as a centre of thought (58 tomes of Yverdon Encyclopedia, published between 1770 and 1780), being in close contact with the great minds and movements of the time.

=== Town hall ===
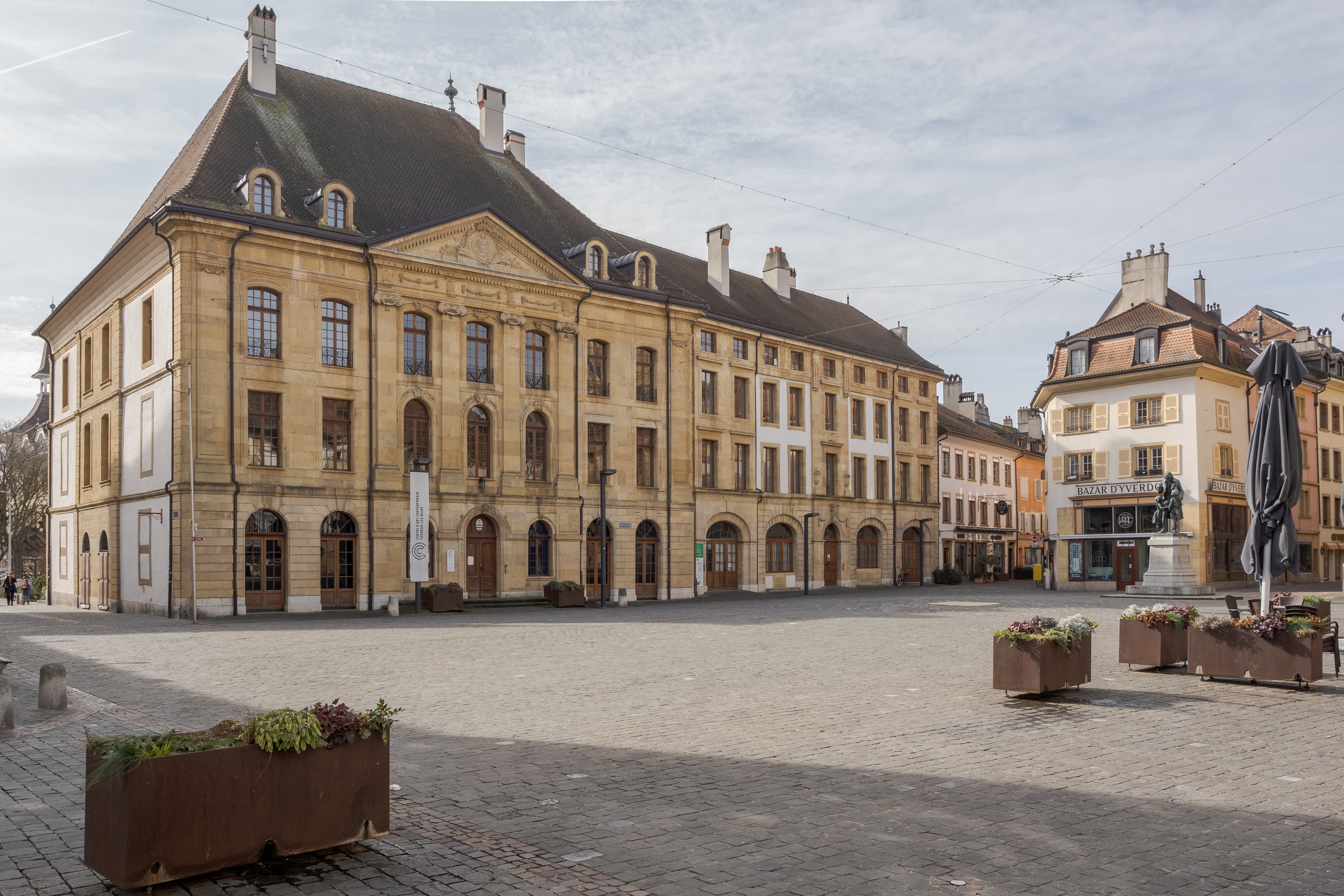
Place Pestalozzi with Town Hall (left)

Burnand, its architect, erected the town hall between 1768 and 1773, on the site of the former covered market. Inside the building, furniture and decorations are displayed, faience stoves, panels, wainscots and paintings. The vaults of the ancient granary are used year-round for art exhibitions.

=== The temple ===
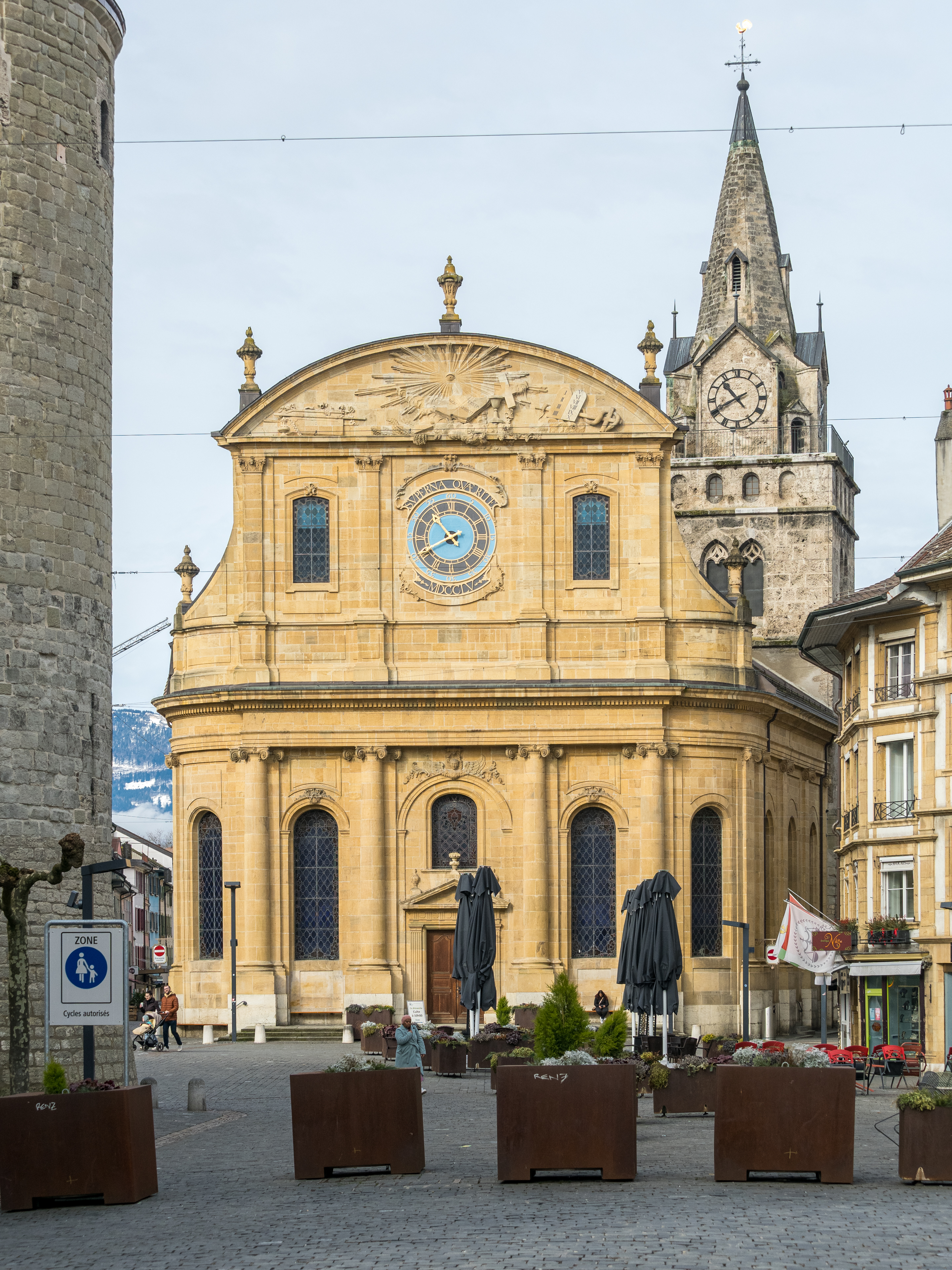
Reformed Church

The Geneva architect Billon erected this Protestant church in 1757, on the site of Notre-Dame chapel of the 14th century. Its spire had been rebuilt in 1608, on the base of the original one, for which huge, sculpted blocks from the ruins of the Roman "Castrum" had been used.

14 stalls, figuring apostles and prophets, originate from the ancient chapel and are ascribed to Claude de Peney, who had worked at Fribourg and Hauterive. Peney died in 1499, and Bon Bottolier, cabinetmaker in Lausanne, was charged with crafting the stalls (1501–1502). Potier, of French origin, built the organ in 1766.

=== Thermal springs ===
The springs were known for their mineral baths and used at least since the Roman era, but most probably before, at the time of the Helvetii. It is supposed that the springs were a sacred place, with some sort of wooden structure. Middle Age documents prove the existence of a spa centre, as early as 1429, and mention several useful buildings.

By 1728, the authorities decided to have a new spa constructed. Its reputation grew rapidly. The 18th century saw major developments and brilliant success, for the town and the spa. Then followed a period of decline: the spa lost its popularity, and by 1800 had declined to a simple political meeting point. Completely neglected, the buildings dilapidated.

Aerial view from 400 m by Walter Mittelholzer (1919)

Encouraged by the Spanish scientist A. Gimbernat, the local Council decided to reconstruct the spa centre and to renovate its hotel in 1897. The consequences of the First World War (1914–1918) were detrimental, the number of guests having significantly declined. Its reputation remained intact, however, until the 1930s.

Another period of decay followed, and by 1960 the centre and its equipment were again so dilapidated that they had to be closed. The idea of balneology had also completely changed. The Municipality repurchased the spa, including the neighbouring Château d'Entremonts. Restoration failed twice, but in 1974 the project could finally be realized. The spa reopened in 1977. Prospects for further thermal springs were successful in 1982, and a new outdoor pool was added a year later. Today, the spa welcomes more than 1200 visitors per day.

During an independent test by the RTS in February 2008, it was found that the water in the shower area of the thermal center had high levels of legionella pneumophila. During another test in 2011, the same programme found no significant levels of dangerous bacteria in the waters. However, in October 2014, there was a leak of 4000l of hydrochloric acid from one of the tanks in the thermal center. No one was hurt, and the bathers remaining in the pools were asked to evacuate.

=== Champ-Pittet manor house ===
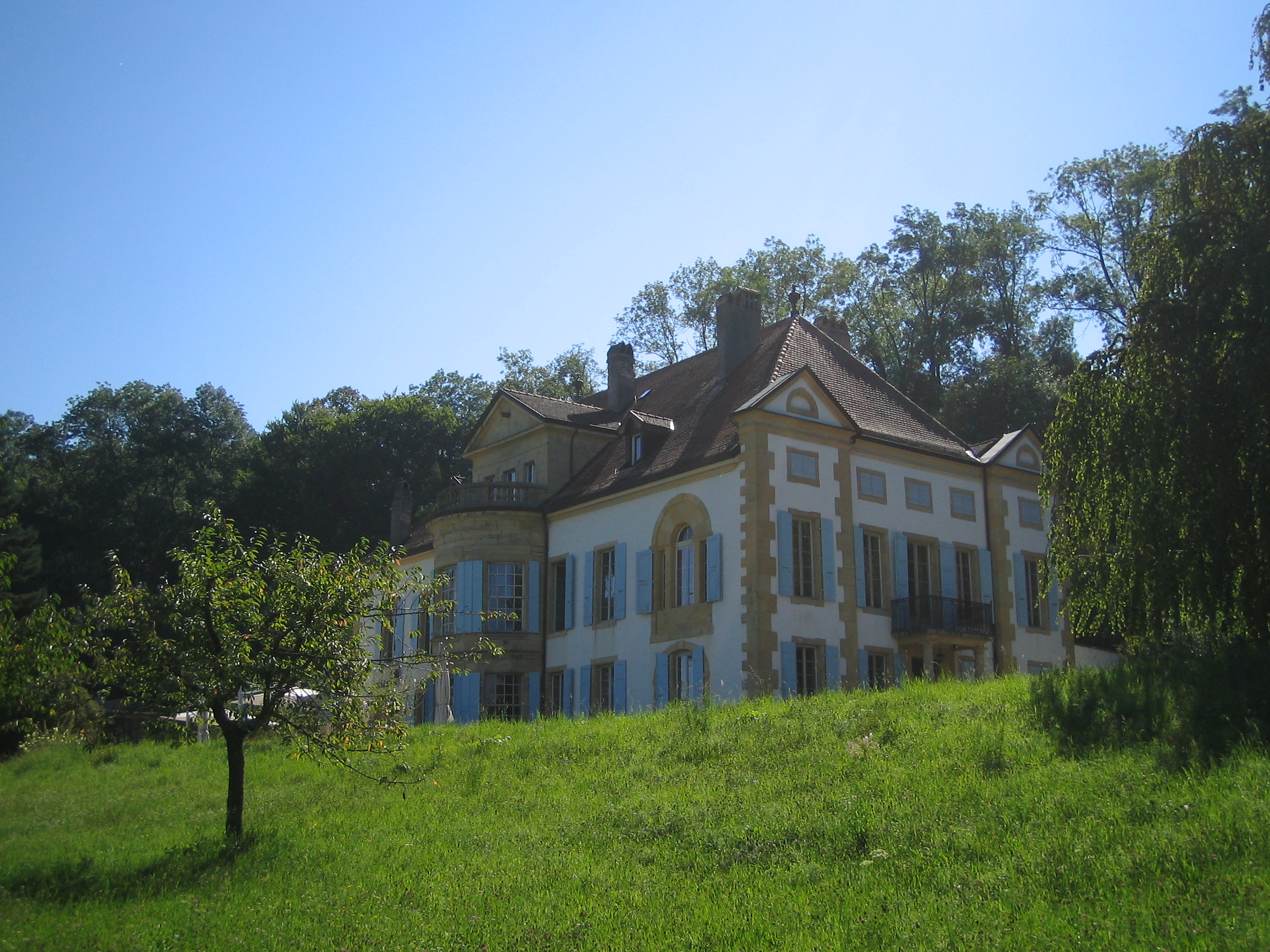
Champ-Pittet manor house (2012).

The 18th century manor house, near the road to Yvonand, has served as summer residence of Frédéric Haldimand, burgher of Yverdon and first Governor of Quebec (1777–1786), when this territory came under the British crown.

This country-seat now belongs to Pro Natura, the Swiss League for the Protection of Nature, and is one of its two nature centres; organizing special exhibitions, audio-visual shows as well as guided tours of the nature reserve, the Grande Caricaie.

== Geography ==
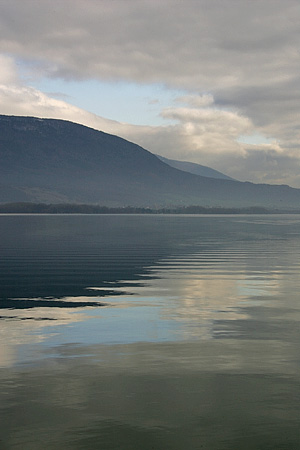
Fog on Lake Neuchâtel outside Yverdon.

Yverdon-les-Bains has an area, as of 2009, of 11.3 square kilometers (4.4 mi^{2}). Of this area, 3.57 km^{2} (1.38 mi^{2}) or 31.6% is used for agricultural purposes, while 0.71 km^{2} (0.27 mi^{2}) or 6.3% is forested. Of the rest of the land, 6.52 km^{2} (2.52 mi^{2}) or 57.8% is settled (buildings or roads), 0.31 km^{2} (0.12 mi^{2}) or 2.7% is either rivers or lakes and 0.2 km^{2} (0.077 mi^{2}) or 1.8% is unproductive land.

Of the built up area, industrial buildings made up 6.6% of the total area while housing and buildings made up 26.2% and transportation infrastructure made up 15.2%. Power and water infrastructure as well as other special developed areas made up 2.5% of the area while parks, green belts and sports fields made up 7.4%. Out of the forested land, 4.7% of the total land area is heavily forested and 1.6% is covered with orchards or small clusters of trees. Of the agricultural land, 27.1% is used for growing crops and 3.5% is pastures. All the water in the municipality is flowing water.

The municipality was the capital of the Yverdon District until it was dissolved on 31 August 2006, and Yverdon-les-Bains became part of the new district of Jura-Nord Vaudois.

The municipality of Gressy merged on 1 July 2011 into the municipality of Yverdon-les-Bains.

== Coat of arms ==
The blazon of the municipal coat of arms is Vert, two Bars wavy Argent, in chief Argent, a letter Y Or.

== Demographics ==
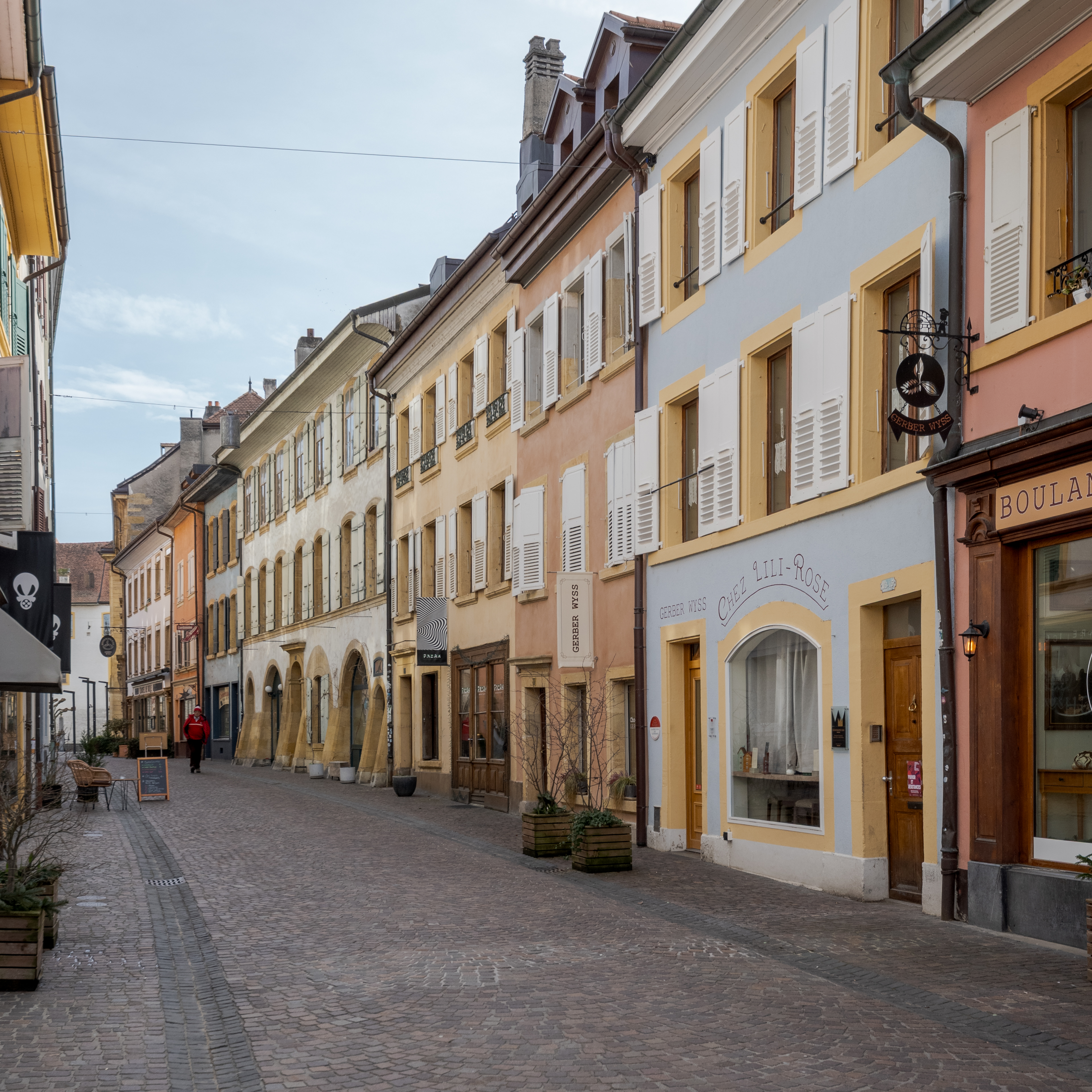
Old town scene (rue du Four)

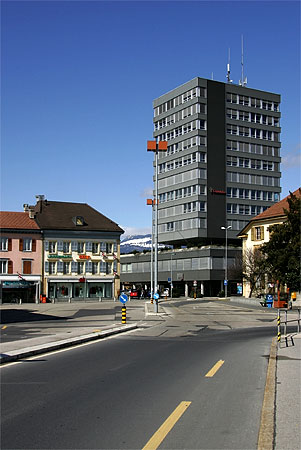
Modern high rise

Yverdon-les-Bains has a population (as of December 2020) of 29,955. As of 2008, 34.2% of the population are resident foreign nationals. Over the last 10 years (1999–2009) the population has changed at a rate of 15.2%. It has changed at a rate of 14% due to migration and at a rate of 1.9% due to births and deaths.

Most of the population (as of 2000) speaks French (20,134 or 82.6%) as their first language, Serbo-Croatian is the second most common (945 or 3.9%) and Portuguese is the third (859 or 3.5%). There are 551 people who speak German, 717 people who speak Italian and 9 people who speak Romansh.

The age distribution, as of 2009, in Yverdon-les-Bains is; 2,821 children or 10.6% of the population are between 0 and 9 years old and 3,041 teenagers or 11.4% are between 10 and 19. Of the adult population, 3,965 people or 14.9% of the population are between 20 and 29 years old. 3,858 people or 14.5% are between 30 and 39, 3,791 people or 14.3% are between 40 and 49, and 3,138 people or 11.8% are between 50 and 59. The senior population distribution is 2,576 people or 9.7% of the population are between 60 and 69 years old, 1,939 people or 7.3% are between 70 and 79, there are 1,235 people or 4.6% who are between 80 and 89, and there are 228 people or 0.9% who are 90 and older.

As of 2000, there were 9,841 people who were single and never married in the municipality. There were 11,252 married individuals, 1,687 widows or widowers and 1,596 individuals who are divorced.

As of 2000, there were 10,835 private households in the municipality, and an average of 2.2 persons per household. There were 4,201 households that consist of only one person and 634 households with five or more people. Out of a total of 11,082 households that answered this question, 37.9% were households made up of just one person and there were 42 adults who lived with their parents. Of the rest of the households, there are 2,848 married couples without children, 2,855 married couples with children. There were 707 single parents with a child or children. There were 182 households that were made up of unrelated people and 247 households that were made up of some sort of institution or another collective housing.

In 2000 there were 1,226 single family homes (or 43.0% of the total) out of a total of 2,850 inhabited buildings. There were 829 multi-family buildings (29.1%), along with 568 multi-purpose buildings that were mostly used for housing (19.9%) and 227 other use buildings (commercial or industrial) that also had some housing (8.0%).

In 2000, a total of 10,649 apartments (88.2% of the total) were permanently occupied, while 1,094 apartments (9.1%) were seasonally occupied and 331 apartments (2.7%) were empty. As of 2009, the construction rate of new housing units was 1 new units per 1000 residents.

As of 2003 the average price to rent an average apartment in Yverdon-les-Bains was 954.90 Swiss francs (CHF) per month (US$760, £430, €610 approx. exchange rate from 2003). The average rate for a one-room apartment was 570.22 CHF (US$460, £260, €360), a two-room apartment was about 721.96 CHF (US$580, £320, €460), a three-room apartment was about 897.75 CHF (US$720, £400, €570) and a six or more room apartment cost an average of 1638.23 CHF (US$1310, £740, €1050). The average apartment price in Yverdon-les-Bains was 85.6% of the national average of 1116 CHF. The vacancy rate for the municipality, in 2010, was 0.49%.

The historical population is given in the following chart:

== Politics ==
In the 2007 federal election the most popular party was the SP which received 29.42% of the vote. The next three most popular parties were the SVP (22.26%), the Green Party (14.34%) and the FDP (9.98%). In the federal election, a total of 5,744 votes were cast, and the voter turnout was 42.2%.

== Economy ==
As of 2010, Yverdon-les-Bains had an unemployment rate of 8.2%. As of 2008, there were 179 people employed in the primary economic sector and about 11 businesses involved in this sector. 2,219 people were employed in the secondary sector and there were 224 businesses in this sector. 10,323 people were employed in the tertiary sector, with 1,119 businesses in this sector. There were 11,191 residents of the municipality who were employed in some capacity, of which females made up 45.2% of the workforce.

In 2008 the total number of full-time equivalent jobs was 10,621. The number of jobs in the primary sector was 173, of which 161 were in agriculture and 12 were in forestry or lumber production. The number of jobs in the secondary sector was 2,104 of which 1,268 or (60.3%) were in manufacturing and 654 (31.1%) were in construction. The number of jobs in the tertiary sector was 8,344. In the tertiary sector; 1,722 or 20.6% were in wholesale or retail sales or the repair of motor vehicles, 711 or 8.5% were in the movement and storage of goods, 523 or 6.3% were in a hotel or restaurant, 222 or 2.7% were in the information industry, 253 or 3.0% were the insurance or financial industry, 549 or 6.6% were technical professionals or scientists, 1,040 or 12.5% were in education and 1,751 or 21.0% were in health care.

In 2000, there were 6,437 workers who commuted into the municipality and 4,894 workers who commuted away. The municipality is a net importer of workers, with about 1.3 workers entering the municipality for every one leaving. About 7.0% of the workforce coming into Yverdon-les-Bains are coming from outside Switzerland, while 0.0% of the locals commute out of Switzerland for work. Of the working population, 16.7% used public transportation to get to work, and 53.9% used a private car.

== Transportation ==
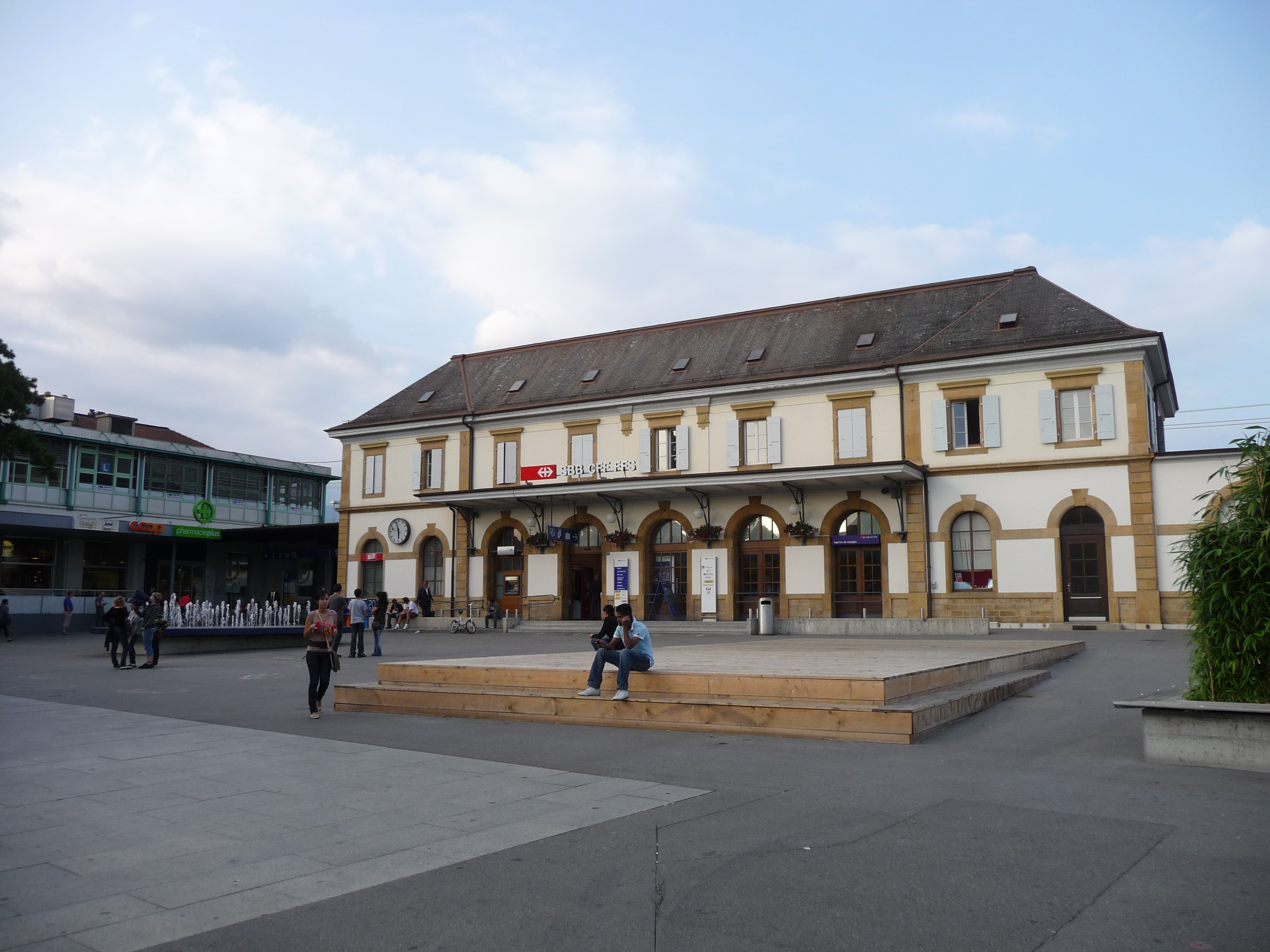
The Yverdon-les-Bains station building in 2009

The municipality has three railway stations, Yverdon-les-Bains, Yverdon-Champ Pittet, and Yverdon William Barbey. The first of these is a major interchange on the standard gauge Fribourg–Yverdon and Jura Foot lines and the narrow-gauge Yverdon–Ste-Croix line. It serves 16,800 passengers on a typical weekday and has regular service to Lausanne, St. Gallen, Geneva Airport, Zürich Hauptbahnhof, Neuchâtel, Palézieux, Fribourg/Freiburg, and Ste-Croix. Yverdon-Champ Pittet is located on the eastern edge of the municipality on the Fribourg–Yverdon line, while Yverdon William Barbey is located west of the city centre on the Yverdon–Ste-Croix line.

== Religion ==
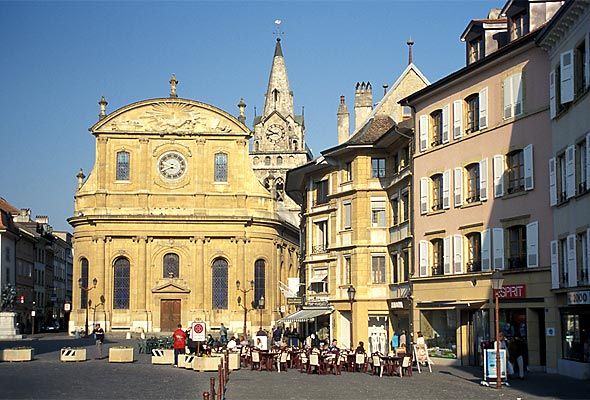
Yverdon city church

From the 2000 census, 8,628 or 35.4% belonged to the Swiss Reformed Church, while 7,489 or 30.7% were Roman Catholic. Of the rest of the population, there were 835 members of an Orthodox church (or about 3.43% of the population), there were 28 individuals (or about 0.11% of the population) who belonged to the Christian Catholic Church, and there were 1,389 individuals (or about 5.70% of the population) who belonged to another Christian church.

There were 25 individuals (or about 0.10% of the population) who were Jewish, and 1,631 (or about 6.69% of the population) who were Muslim. There were 74 individuals who were Buddhist, 183 individuals who were Hindu and 38 individuals who belonged to another church. 3,061 (or about 12.56% of the population) belonged to no church, are agnostic or atheist, and 1,668 individuals (or about 6.84% of the population) did not answer the question.

== Weather ==
Yverdon-les-Bains has an average of 118.4 days of rain or snow per year and on average receives 893 mm (35.2 in) of precipitation. The wettest month is June during which time Yverdon-les-Bains receives an average of 92 mm (3.6 in) of rain or snow. During this month there is precipitation for an average of 11.2 days. The month with the most days of precipitation is May, with an average of 11.4, but with only 80 mm (3.1 in) of rain or snow. The driest month of the year is April with an average of 59 mm (2.3 in) of precipitation over 9.4 days.

== Education ==
Yverdon-les-Bains is a university town, hosting the School of Business and Engineering Vaud, a public university with over 2000 students and largest branch of the University of Applied Sciences Western Switzerland, distributed over three adjacent sites at Yverdon: Route de Cheseaux, Centre St-Roch, and Centre Y-Parc.

In Yverdon-les-Bains about 7,695 or (31.6%) of the population have completed non-mandatory upper secondary education, and 2,339 or (9.6%) have completed additional higher education (either university or a Fachhochschule). Of the 2,339 who completed tertiary schooling, 50.6% were Swiss men, 28.3% were Swiss women, 13.6% were non-Swiss men and 7.5% were non-Swiss women.

In the 2009/2010 school year there were a total of 3,093 students in the Yverdon-les-Bains school district. In the Vaud cantonal school system, two years of non-obligatory pre-school are provided by the political districts. During the school year, the political district provided pre-school care for a total of 578 children of which 359 children (62.1%) received subsidized pre-school care. The canton's primary school program requires students to attend for four years. There were 1,589 students in the municipal primary school program. The obligatory lower secondary school program lasts for six years and there were 1,410 students in those schools. There were also 94 students who were home schooled or attended another non-traditional school.

As of 2000, there were 2,043 students in Yverdon-les-Bains who came from another municipality, while 507 residents attended schools outside the municipality.

Yverdon-les-Bains is home to the Maison d'Ailleurs museum, the Musée d'Yverdon et région and the Musée suisse de la Mode. In 2009 the Maison d'Ailleurs was visited by 12,000 visitors (the average in previous years was 9,838). In 2009 the Musée d'Yverdon et région was visited by 8,051 visitors (the average in previous years was 7,871). In 2009 the Musée suisse de la Mode was visited by 8,051 visitors (the average in previous years was 7,871).

Yverdon-les-Bains is home to 2 libraries. These libraries include; the Bibliothèque publique Yverdon and the Haute école d'ingénierie et de gestion du Canton de Vaud. There was a combined total (as of 2008) of 99,302 books or other media in the libraries, and in the same year a total of 124,282 items were loaned out.

== Sport ==
Yverdon-Sport FC is the municipality's football club.

== Heritage sites of national significance ==
There are nine sites that are listed as Swiss heritage site of national significance in Yverdon. The public buildings are; the Public Library of Yverdon-Les-Bains, Yverdon Castle and museum, the City Hall, the L'ancien hôtel de l'Aigle, the Thorens House (formerly Steiner House) and the Villa d'Entremont. It includes one religious building, the Temple. The last two sites are Clendy, a littoral settlement and prehistoric megalithic site and Eburodunum, a Celtic oppidum, a Roman vicus and a medieval and modern village.

=== Notable buildings and locations ===
Benno Besson Theatre

- the "Menhir-Statues", including the stone rows at Clendy, dating as far back as the third millennium BC
- the Castrum, remains of gigantic ramparts and towers from the Roman era
- the thermal springs
- the 13th-century castle
- the "Temple", an 18th-century Protestant church
- the Grande Caricaie, a nature reserve stretching along the southern shore of Lake Neuchâtel
- the Maison d'Ailleurs (House of Elsewhere), "a museum of science fiction, utopia and extraordinary journeys", founded in 1976 and the only museum of its kind in Europe
- the Benno Besson Theatre, oldest theatre of Yverdon built in 1898.
- the Town Hall Gallery
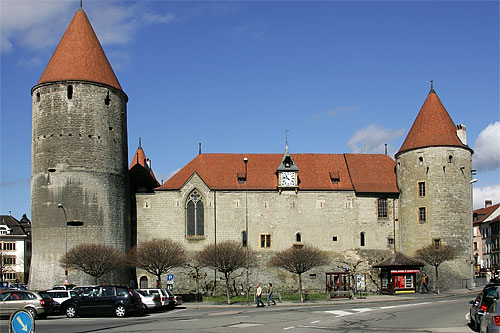
Yverdon Castle and Museum

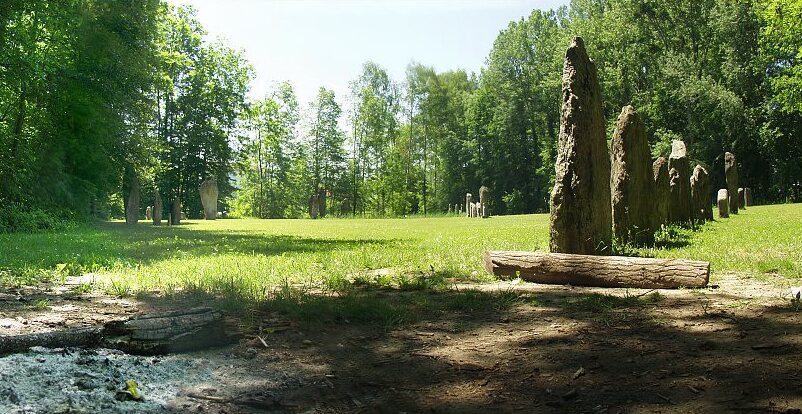
Clendy, a littoral settlement and prehistoric megalithic site

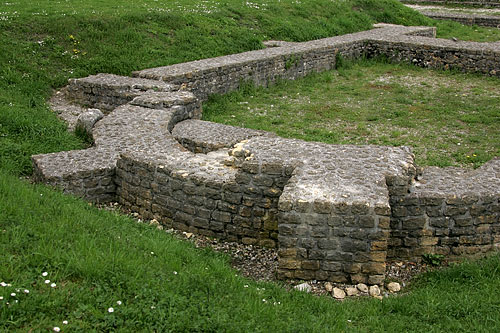
Eburodunum, a Celtic oppidum, a Roman vicus and a medieval and modern village

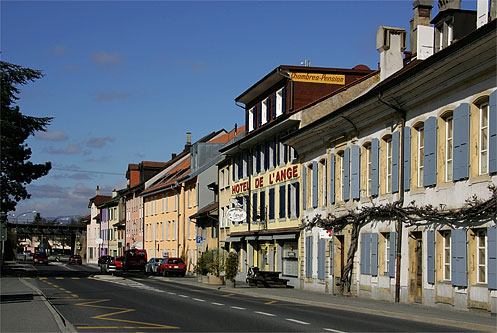
L'ancien hôtel de l'Ange

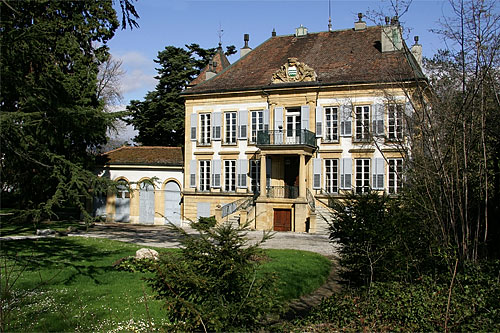
Villa d'Entremont

=== World heritage site ===
The prehistoric settlement at Baie de Clendy is part of the Prehistoric Pile dwellings around the Alps a UNESCO World Heritage Site.

== Notable people ==
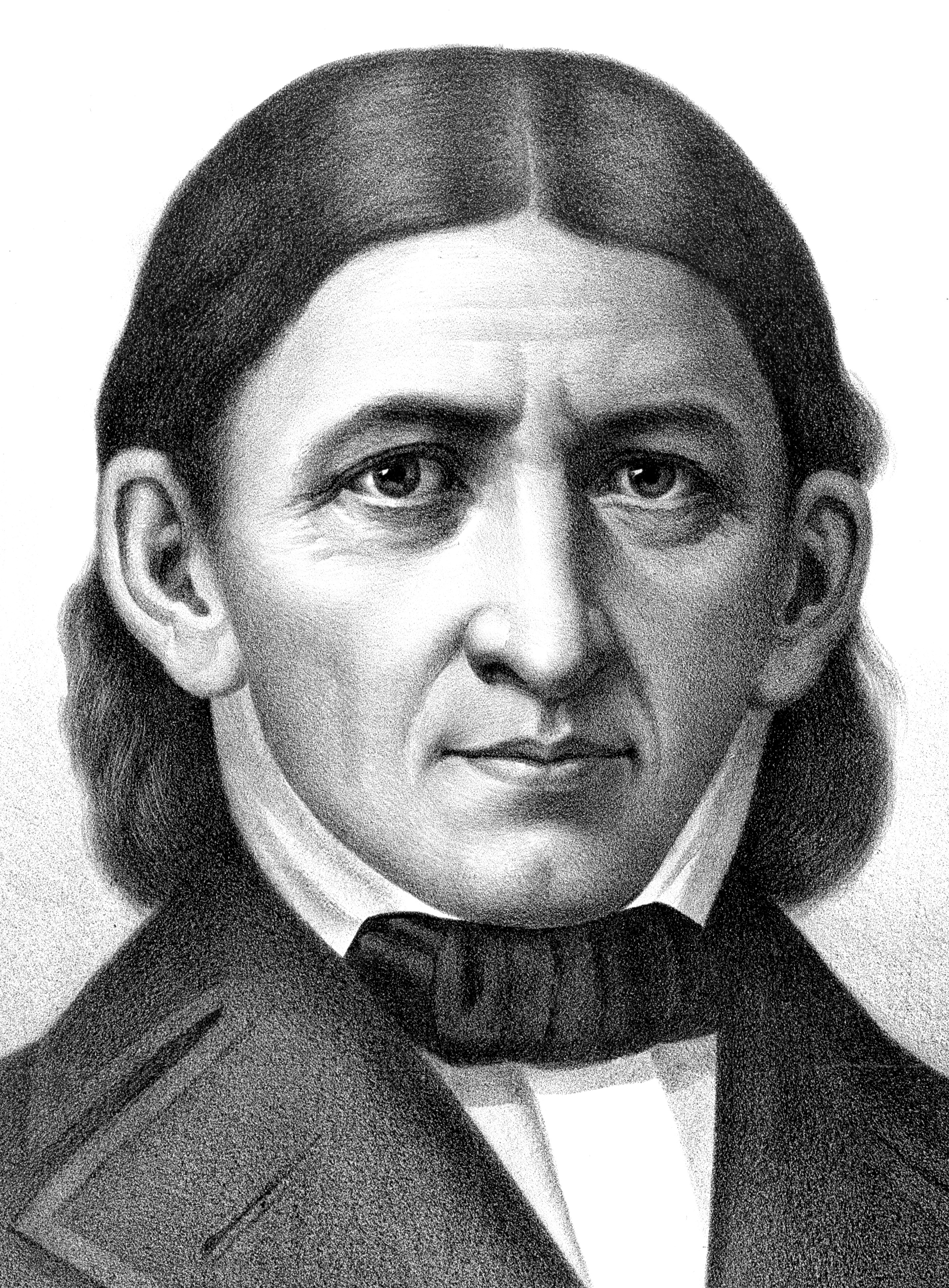
Frederick Froebel

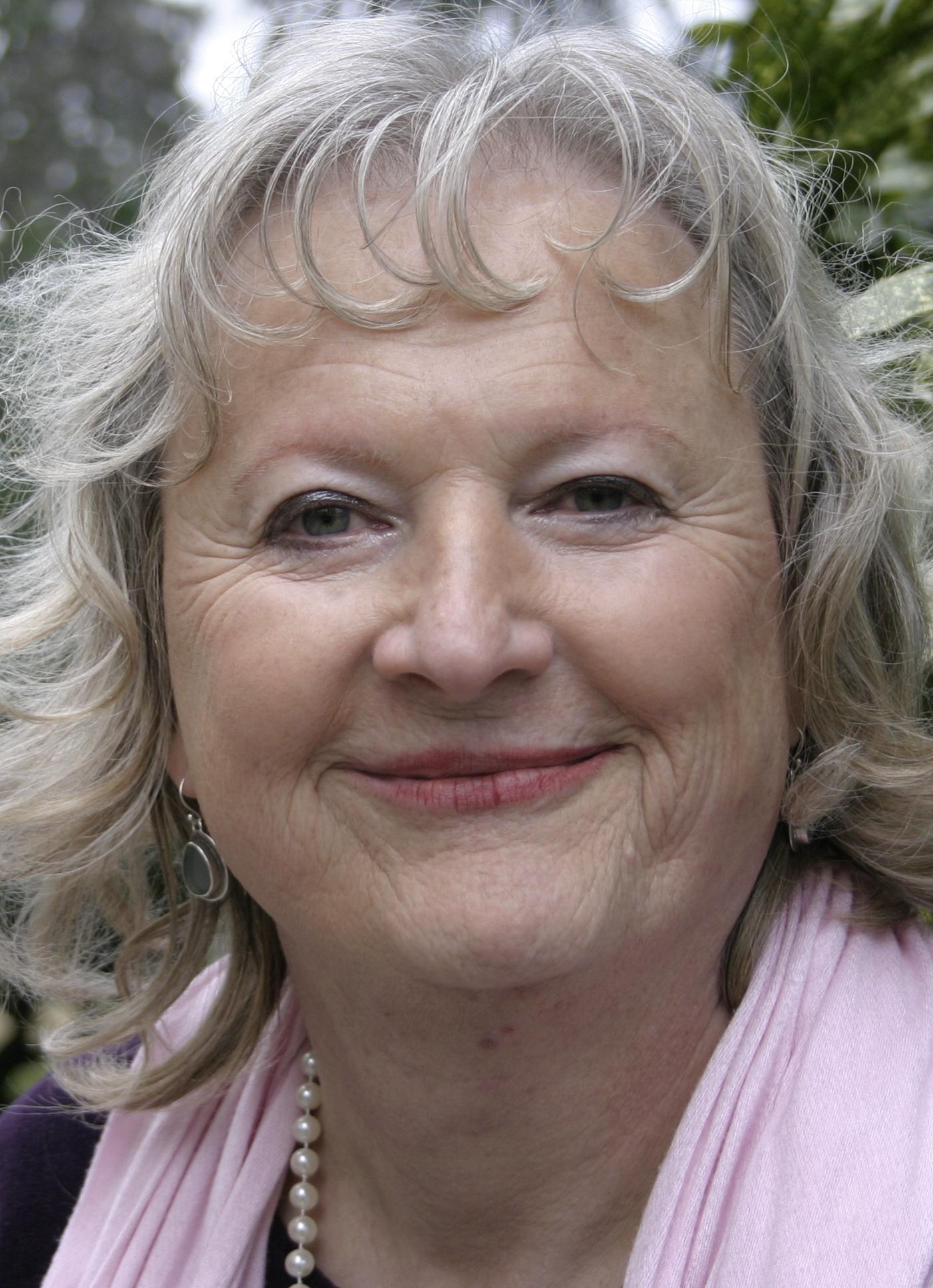
Christa Muth, 2011

- Bernard Gilles Penot (1519–1617), a French Renaissance alchemist and doctor
- Jean-Jacques Rousseau (1712–1778), a Genevan philosopher, writer and composer
- Sir Frederick Haldimand KB (1718–1791), a military officer in the British Army in North America during the Seven Years' War and the American Revolutionary War
- Fortunato de Felice, 2nd Count Panzutti (1723–1789), an Italian nobleman, author, philosopher and scientist
- Johann Heinrich Pestalozzi (1746–1827), a pedagogue and educational reformer who exemplified Romanticism
- François-Rodolphe de Weiss (1751–1818), a political and military leader, writer and philosopher, a follower of Jean-Jacques Rousseau
- Friedrich Fröbel (1782–1852), a German pedagogue, a student of Pestalozzi
- Louis Vulliemin (1797–1879), a theologian and historian
- Marcel Lequatre (1882–1960), a professional road racing cyclist 1902–1919
- Robert Piguet (1898–1953), a Paris-based fashion designer, trained Christian Dior and Hubert de Givenchy
- Manuela Soto Sosa (born 1991), a multidisciplanry artist of Uruguayan descent
- Jona von Ustinov (1892–1962), a German journalist and diplomat, father of Sir Peter Ustinov
- Georges Dumitresco (1922–2008), Romanian-Swiss physician, painter, illustrator and poet
- Benno Besson (1922–2006), an actor and director
- Pierre D'Archambeau (1927–2014), of Belgian parents, an American violin virtuoso and pedagogue
- Rodolphe Kasser (1927–2013), philologist and archaeologist, translated ancient Coptic language manuscripts
- Christa Muth (born 1949), a German systems scientist, management professor and management consultant
- Steve Zacchia (born 1982), a racing driver
- Iman Beney (born 2006), footballer for the Switzerland national team

== International relations ==
Yverdon is twinned with:

Collesano, Sicily Italy; Kagamino, Japan; Nogent-sur-Marne, France	Pontarlier, France; Prokuplje, Serbia; Winterthur, Switzerland
