= Thomas Wilson (bishop) =

Anglican bishop of Sodor and Man

The Right Reverend Thomas Wilson
- Bishop of Sodor and Man
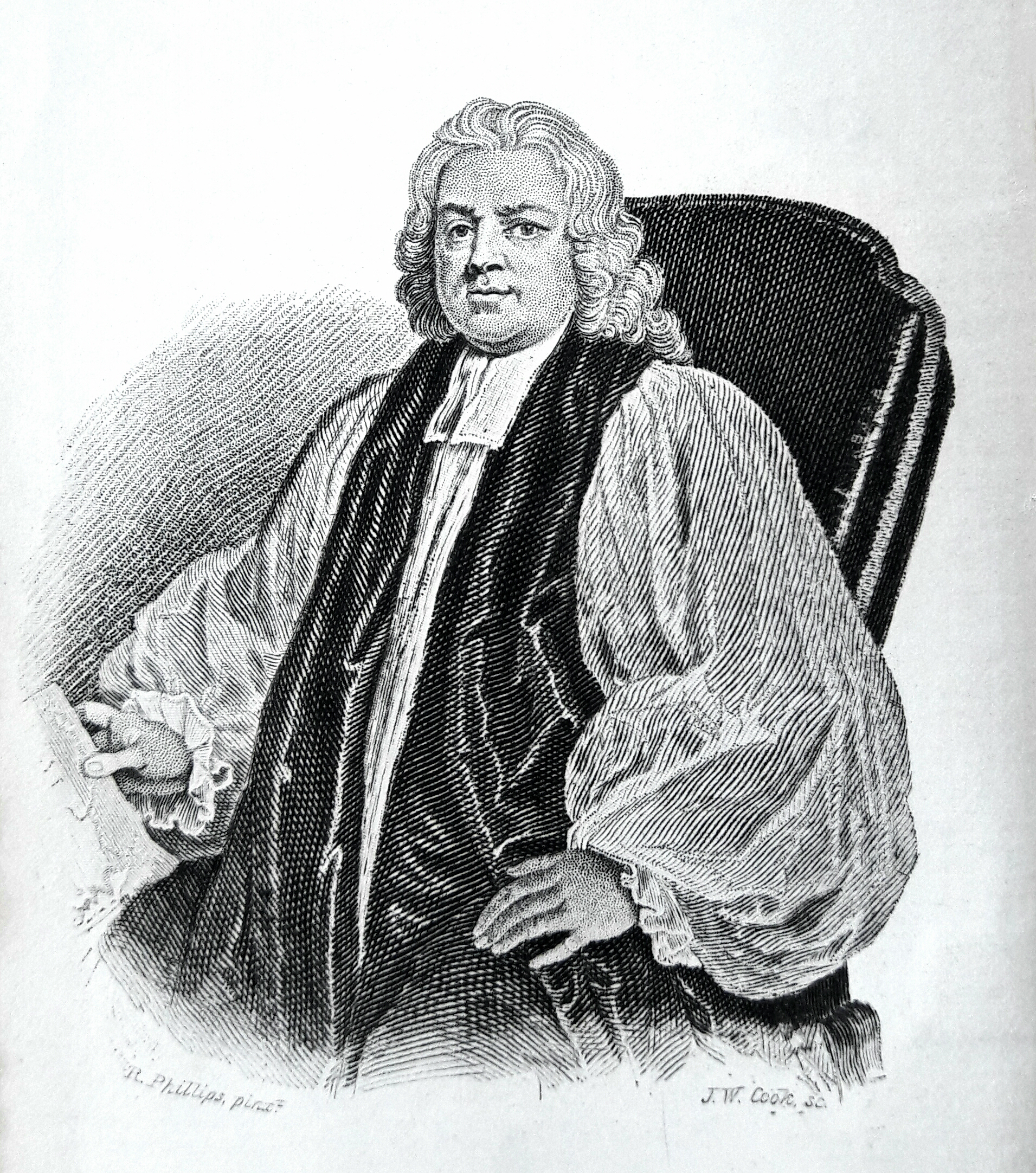
- Church: Church of England
- See: Sodor and Man
- In office: 1697–1755
- Predecessor: Baptist Levinz
- Successor: Mark Hiddesley

Orders
- Ordination: 20 October 1689
- Consecration: 16 January 1698

Personal details
- Born: 20 December 1663 Burton, Cheshire, England
- Died: 7 March 1755 (aged 91) Michael, Isle of Man

Thomas Wilson (20 December 1663 – 7 March 1755) was Bishop of Sodor and Man between 1697 and 1755.

He was born in Burton in the Wirral, Cheshire, in December 1663. Having studied medicine at Trinity College, Dublin, he was ordained a priest in 1689. In 1692 the Lord of Mann, William Stanley, 9th Earl of Derby, appointed him personal chaplain and tutor to the earl's son. Five years later, at Lord Derby's urging, Wilson accepted promotion to the vacant bishopric of Sodor and Man.

When he came to the Isle of Man, he found the buildings of the diocese in a ruinous condition. The building of new churches was one of his first acts, and he eventually rebuilt most of the churches of the diocese along with establishing public libraries. He oversaw the passing in the Tynwald of the Act of Settlement 1704 that provided tenants with rights to sell and pass on their land, subject only to continued fixed rents and alienation fees. Wilson worked to restore ecclesiastical discipline on the Island, although he clashed with civil authorities partly because of the reduction of revenue from Wilson mitigating fines in the spiritual court. He met James Oglethorpe in London and because of that meeting became interested in foreign missions. He was an early advocate of the Society for the Propagation of the Gospel in Foreign Parts.

Bishop Wilson's relations with the people of the Isle of Man were marked by mutual affection and esteem. His personal piety expressed itself in energetic charitable activity and he often intervened to shield his flock from the demands of the state authorities. He declined preferment to the much wealthier See of Exeter. When he died on 7 March 1755 at the age of 91, it is said that his funeral was attended by nearly the whole adult population of the Isle of Man.

== Early life (1663–87) ==
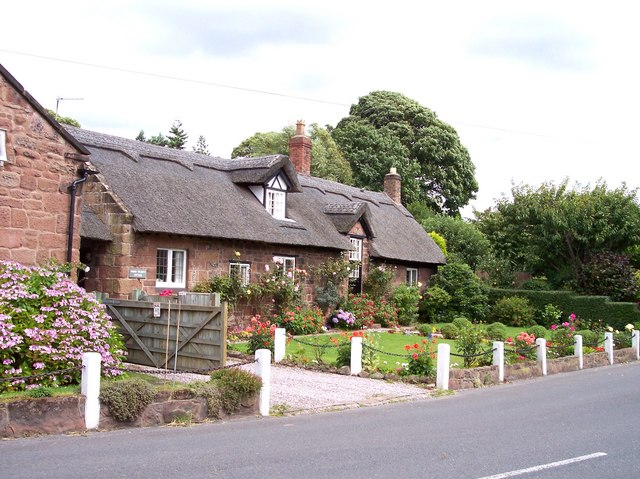
His family home (now known as Bishop Wilson's Cottage) at Burton, Cheshire

Wilson was the sixth of seven children and fifth son of Nathaniel Wilson (died 29 May 1702) and Alice Wilson née Browne (died 16 August 1708). He was born at Burton, Cheshire on 20 December 1663. According to Wilson's biographer John Keble, both sides of his family had been Burton residents for many centuries. Much of Wilson's childhood was spent at the parsonage in Winwick, Lancashire, where his paternal half-uncle, Richard Sherlock was rector; Sherlock supervised Wilson's training. It was through Sherlock that the earliest connection to the Isle of Man can be made, insofar as he was chaplain to the son of the 7th Earl of Derby and Lord of Mann, amongst whose ambitions were to restore order to the church in the Isle of Man after a breakdown in the seventeenth century.

Wilson was tutored at The King's School, Chester and entered Trinity College, Dublin as a sizar on 29 May 1682. His tutor was John Barton, afterwards dean of Ardagh. Jonathan Swift entered in the previous month, and other contemporaries included Peter Browne and Edward Chandler. He was elected scholar on 4 June 1683. In February 1686 he graduated with a B.A.. The influence of Archdeacon Michael Heweton (died 1709), a prebendary of St Patrick's Cathedral, turned his thoughts from medicine to the church. He was ordained deacon before attaining the canonical age by William Moreton, bishop of Kildare on 29 June 1686 in Kildare Cathedral on the day of its consecration.

He left Ireland on 10 February 1687 to become curate to his uncle Sherlock in the chapelry of Newchurch Kenyon at the parish of Winwick. He was ordained priest by Nicholas Stratford on 20 October 1689 and remained in charge of Newchurch with a salary of £30 until the end of August 1692. He was then appointed domestic chaplain to William Stanley, 9th Earl of Derby. Early in 1693, he was appointed master of the almshouse at Lathom, yielding £20 more. At Easter he made a vow to set apart a fifth of his small income for charity, especially for the poor. Wilson gave up his parish duties to concentrate on the education of the Earl's heir apparent, continuing in that role for five years. Keble suggests that the Stanley family approved of Wilson's acceptance of the Glorious Revolution of 1688. Stowall suggests that Wilson became more highly valued by the 9th Earl after giving him strong counsel against his indebtedness and reminding him of the potential for financial crisis arising out of any change in government.

In June 1693 he was offered by Lord Derby the valuable rectory of Badsworth in the West Riding of Yorkshire, but refused it, having made a resolution against non-residence. He received his M.A. in 1696. On 27 October 1698 he was married at Winwick to Mary (16 July 1674 – 7 March 1705), daughter of Thomas Patten. The couple had four children, of whom only Thomas survived to adulthood and became prebendary of Westminster and rector of St Stephen Walbrook.

=== Preferment ===
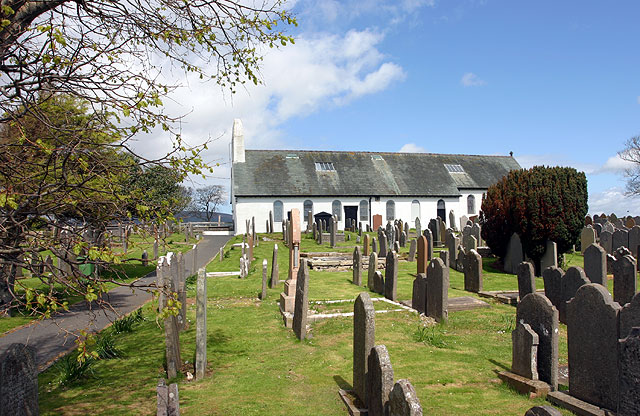
A church in Malew in the Isle of Man

On 27 November 1696 Lord Derby offered him the bishopric of Sodor and Man, vacant since the death of Baptist Levinz, and insisted on his taking it. Derby had previously offered the position to Wilson who had "modestly declined". The background to the insistent offer was a complaint made to William III by the Archbishop of York, John Sharp about the length of the vacancy; the previous and largely absentee incumbent Baptist Levinz had died in 1693. William gave an ultimatum to Derby of an immediate nomination, or else an imposition at the King's will. William assented to Wilson's elevation on 25 December 1697 and ordered the Archbishop of York to consecrate Wilson as bishop. On 10 January 1697 he was created LL.D. by Thomas Tenison, Archbishop of Canterbury (a so-called Lambeth degree). On 16 January 1697, he was consecrated bishop at the Savoy Chapel, London. On 28 January the rectory of Badsworth was again offered to him in commendam, and again refused, though the see of Man was worth no more than £300 a year. His first business was to recover the arrears of royal bounty (an annuity of £100, granted 1675).

== Work in the Isle of Man (1697–1749) ==
Bishopscourt, Kirk Michael

On 6 April he landed at Derbyhaven in the Isle of Man. He was installed on 11 April 1697 in the ruins of St German's Cathedral, within Peel Castle at Peel. At once he took up his residence at Bishopscourt, Kirk Michael, which he found also in a ruinous condition, with only a tower and chapel standing. Wilson set about rebuilding the greater part of it, at a cost of £1,400, of which all but £200 came from his own pocket. He soon became 'a very energetic planter' of fruit and forest trees, turning 'the bare slopes' into 'a richly wooded glen'. He was a zealous farmer and miller, doing much by his example to develop the resources of the Island. For some time he was the only physician in the Island. He set up a drug-shop, giving advice and medicine to the poor for free.

He had been on the Island for less than two months when he had before him the petition of Christopher Hampton of Kirk Braddan, whose wife had been condemned to seven years' penal servitude for lamb stealing, and who asked the bishop's licence for a second marriage in consideration of his "motherless children." On 26 May 1698, Wilson gave him "liberty to make such a choice as may be most for your support and comfort." Yet his views of marriage were usually strict; marriage with a deceased wife's sister he regarded as incest.

The building of new churches (beginning with the Castletown chapel, 1698) was one of his earliest cares and, in 1699, he took up the concept of parochial libraries devised by his friend Thomas Bray and began the establishment of such libraries in his diocese. This led to provision in the Manx language for the needs of his people. The printing of prayers for the poor families is projected in a memorandum of Whit-Sunday 1699, but was not carried out until 30 May 1707, the date of issue of his Principles and Duties of Christianity ... in English and Manks, with short and plain directions and prayers, 1707. This was the first book published in Manx, and is often styled the Manx Catechism. It was followed in 1733, by A Further Instruction and A Short and Plain Instruction for the Lord's Supper. The Gospel of St. Matthew was translated, with the help of his vicars-general in 1722 and published in 1748 under the sponsorship of his successor as bishop, Mark Hildesley. The remaining Gospels and the Acts were also translated into Manx under his supervision, but not published. He freely issued occasional orders for special services, with new prayers, the Act of Uniformity 1662 not specifying the Isle of Man. A public library was established by Wilson at Castletown in 1706 and, from that year, by help of the trustees of the "academic fund" and by benefactions from Lady Elizabeth. He did much to increase the efficiency of the grammar schools and parish schools in the Island. He was created DD at Oxford on 3 April 1707 and incorporated at Cambridge on 11 June. In 1724 he founded, and in 1732 endowed, a school at Burton, his birthplace.

=== Land tenancy issues ===
Wilson was centrally involved in another needed improvement to the Island other than the construction of libraries and chapels and the dissemination of contemporary farming methods. Land tenure issues were a major source of instability for tenants on the Island, which had not yet made a clean break from more ancient feudal traditions. Attempts by previous earls of Derby to assert landlord rights had unsettled the community. Wilson was charged by the 9th earl with gathering proposals for change from tenants, work which led to fruition under the 10th earl, with the passing in the Tynwald of the Act of Settlement 1704. This was seen by islanders as their Magna Carta. The act provided tenants with rights to sell and pass on their land, subject only to continued fixed rents and alienation fees being paid to the Stanley family.

=== Restoration of ecclesiastical discipline ===
The restoration of ecclesiastical discipline on the Island was a serious task for Wilson. Scandals, frequently involving the morals of the clergy, gave him trouble. The "spiritual statutes" of the Island (valid, where not superseded by the Anglican canons of 1603) were of native growth, and often uncouth in their provisions. Without attempting to disturb these, with the single exception of abolishing commutation of penance by fine, Wilson drew a set of ten Ecclesiastical Constitutions which were subscribed by the clergy in a convocation at Bishopscourt on 3 February 1704 and ratified by the governor of the Isle of Man and council the next day. These were then confirmed by James Stanley, 10th Earl of Derby, and publicly proclaimed on the Tynwald Hill on 6 June. Of these constitutions it was said by Peter King, 1st Baron King, that "if the ancient discipline of the church were lost, it might be found in all its purity in the Isle of Man".

=== Civil and ecclesiastical conflict ===
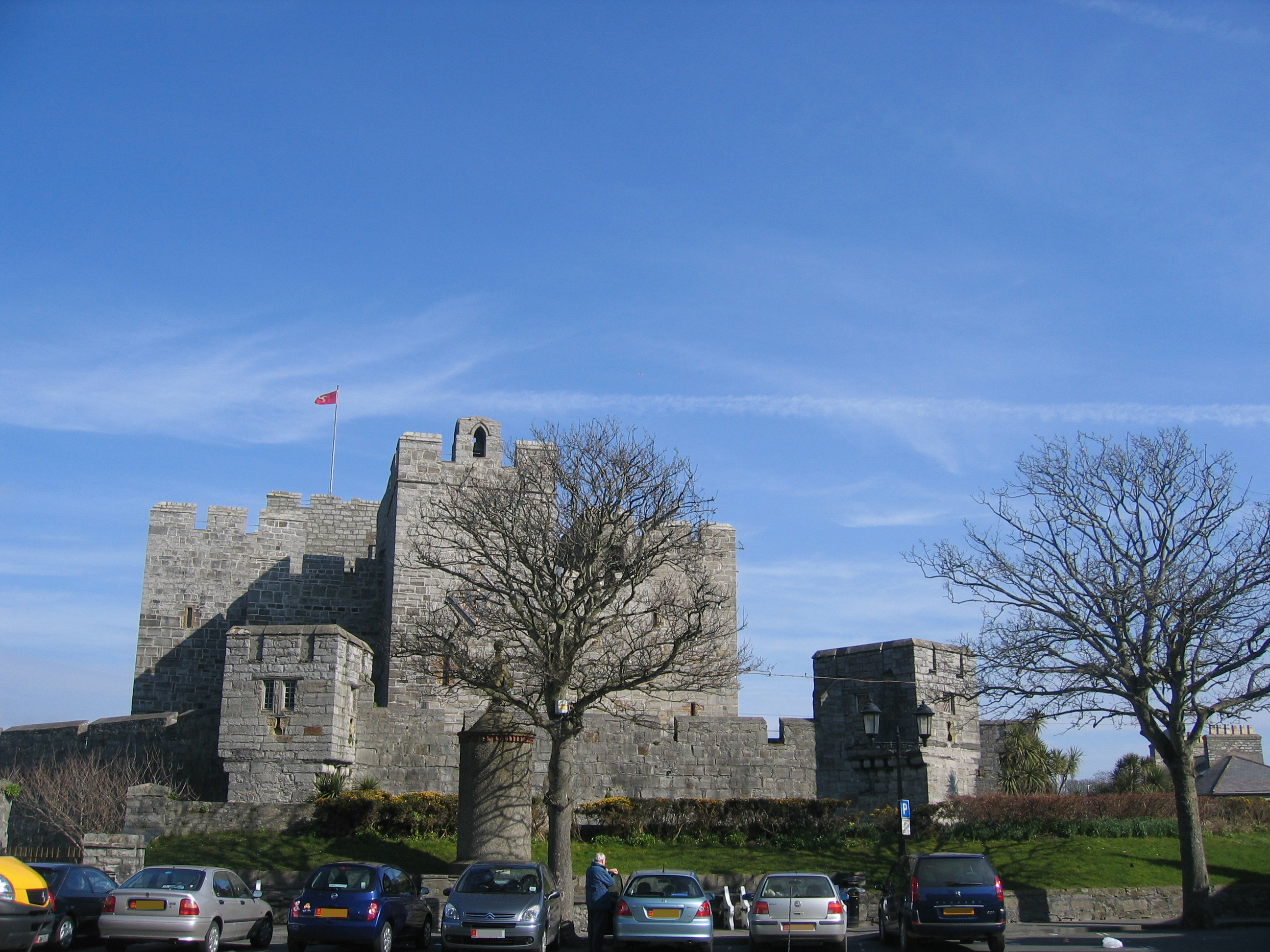
Castle Rushen today, where Wilson was held for a time

Improved discipline worked smoothly till 1718, when it came into collision with the Earl's civil authorities, owing in part to the reduction of revenue through Wilson's practice of mitigating fines in the spiritual court. Robert Mawdesley, governor from 1703, had been in harmony with Wilson; his successor in 1713, Alexander Horne, became Wilson's determined opponent. The substantive points at issue appear to be whether appeals in ecclesiastical cases should be made to ecclesiastical authorities or to the civil authority of the Lord of Mann; and, later, whether or not soldiers of the Lord of Mann should fall under ecclesiastical rule. The first direct conflict began in 1716. Mary Henricks, a married woman, was excommunicated for adultery, and condemned to penance and prison. She appealed to the lord of the isle, and Horne allowed the appeal. Wilson, maintaining that there was no appeal except to the Archbishop of York, did not appear at the hearing, and was fined £10; the fine was remitted. The episcopal registrar, John Woods of Kirk Malew, was twice imprisoned (1720 and 1721) for refusing to act without the bishop's direction. In 1721, the governor's wife, Jane Horne, was ordered to ask forgiveness (in mitigation of penance) for slanderous statements. For admitting her to communion and for false doctrine the Archdeacon of Man, Robert Horrobin, the governor's chaplain, was suspended in 1722. Refusing to recall the sentence, Wilson was fined £60, and his vicars-general £20 apiece, and in default were imprisoned in Castle Rushen. Wilson appealed to the Crown; they were released, but the fines were paid through Thomas Corlett. The dampness of the prison had so affected Wilson's right hand that he was henceforth unable to move his fingers to write. In 1724 the bishopric of Exeter was offered to Wilson as a means of reimbursement. He refused, reputedly saying to Queen Caroline, "I will not forsake my wife and children because they are poor". On his declining, George I promised to meet his expenses from the privy purse, a pledge which the king's death left unfulfilled.

Thomas Wilson, engraving by John Simon, after Richard Phillips

Part of Horrobin's doctrine was his approval of a book which Wilson had censured. On 19 January 1722 John Stevenson, a layman of Balladoole, forwarded to Wilson a copy of the Independent Whig, 1721, which had been circulated in the Island and sent to Stevenson by Richard Worthington for the public library. Wilson issued a pastoral letter to his clergy, bidding them excommunicate the "agents and abettors" of "such-like blasphemous books". For suppressing the book Stevenson was imprisoned in Castle Rushen by Horne, who required Wilson to deliver up the volume as a condition of Stevenson's release. This he did under protest. When the book reached William Koss, the librarian, he said "he would as soon take poison as receive that book into the library upon any other terms or conditions than immediately to burn it". Horrobin, on the other hand, affirmed that the work "had rules and directions in it sufficient to bring us to heaven, if we could observe them".

Horne was superseded in 1728. Floyd, his successor, was generally unpopular. With the appointment of Thomas Horton in 1725, began a new conflict between civil and ecclesiastical authority. Lord Derby now claimed, on 5 October 1725, that the act of Henry VIII, placing Man in the province of York, abrogated all insular laws in matters spiritual. The immediate result was that Horton refused to carry out a recent decision of the House of Keys, granting soldiers to execute orders of the ecclesiastical court. A revision of the "spiritual statutes" was proposed by the House of Keys, with Wilson's concurrence. Horton took the step of suspending the whole code until "amended and revised". He further deprived the sumner-general and appointed another. Unavailing petitions for redress were sent to Lord Derby; the House of Keys appealed on 6 November 1728 to the king in council, but nothing came of it.

On 1 February 1736 the tenth Lord Derby died and the lordship of Man passed to James Murray, 2nd Duke of Atholl. The revision of statutes proposed in 1725 was at once carried through, with the result of "a marked absence of disputes between the civil and ecclesiastical courts". The intricate suit about impropriations (to all of which Atholl had a legal claim) jeopardised for a time the temporalities of the church, and was not settled till 7 July 1757 after Wilson's death. In 1737, with the aid of Sir Joseph Jekyll, Wilson and his son were able to recover certain deeds securing to the clergy an equivalent for their tithe. Between Wilson and Atholl (and the governors of his appointment) there seems never to have been any personal friction. Under the revised ecclesiastical law presentments for moral offences were less frequent, procedure being less summary. But, while his health lasted, Wilson was sedulous in administering the discipline through the spiritual courts, and there was an increase of clerical cases. The extreme difficulty of obtaining suitable candidates for the miserably poor paying benefices led Wilson to get leave from the archbishop of York to ordain before the canonical age.

=== Toleration and wider interests ===
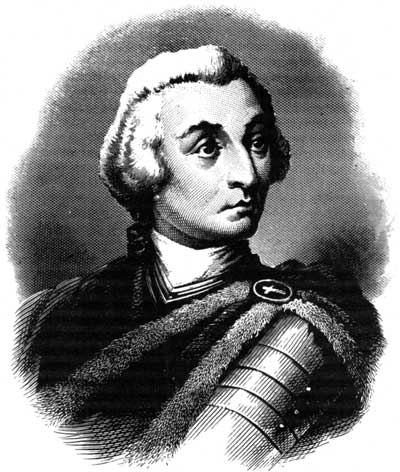
James Oglethorpe interested Wilson in foreign missions

Wilson was not by nature an intolerant man, nor were his sympathies limited to the Anglican fold. It is said that Cardinal Fleury wrote to him, "as they were the two oldest bishops", and, he believed, "the poorest in Europe" invited him to France. He was so pleased with Wilson's reply that he got an order prohibiting French privateers from ravaging the Isle of Man. Roman Catholics "not unfrequently attended" his services. He allowed dissenters to sit or stand at the communion and not being compelled to kneel, they did so. The Quakers loved and respected him.

In 1735, he met James Oglethorpe in London, and this was the beginning of his practical interest in foreign missions, though he was an early advocate of the Society for the Propagation of the Gospel in Foreign Parts, and still earlier of the Society for Promoting Christian Knowledge. His Essay towards an Instruction for the Indians ... in ... Dialogues, written in 1740, was begun at Oglethorpe's instance, and dedicated to the Trustees for the Establishment of the Colony of Georgia in America (in 1745 he became a member of the Georgia Trustees). Wilson's son was entrusted with its revision for the press, and he submitted the manuscript to Isaac Watts. Most of the Georgia trustees were Dissenters. Since 1738 Wilson had "been interested in Zinzendorf, through friends who had met him at Oxford and London in 1737. In 1739, he corresponded with Henry Cossart, author of a Short Account of the Moravian Churches and received from Zinzendorf and his coadjutors a copy of the Moravian catechism, with a letter dated 28 July 1740. Zinzendorf was again in London in 1749, holding there a synod from 11 to 30 September. On 23 September, news came of the death of Cochius of Berlin, 'antistes' of the 'reformed tropus' (one of three) in the Moravian Church. The vacant and somewhat shadowy office was tendered to Wilson, with liberty to employ his son as substitute, Zinzendorf sending him a seal-ring. On 19 December Wilson wrote his acceptance.

== Later years and death (1749–55) ==
From his eighty-sixth year, Wilson was burdened with gout. He died at Bishopscourt on 7 March 1755, the fiftieth anniversary of his wife's death. His coffin was made from an elm tree planted by himself, and made into planks for that purpose some years before his death. He had a strong objection, mentioned in his will, to interments within churches, and was buried (11 March) at the east end of Kirk Michael churchyard, where a square marble monument marks his grave. Reverend Philip Moore preached the funeral sermon.

== Legacy ==
Wilson acted with the single aim of the moral and religious improvement of his people was recognised by them, and his strictness, joined with his self-denying charities, drew to him the affectionate veneration of those to whom he dedicated his work. Certainly, his fifty-eight years of service to the Island as a resident bishop; his interest in the language and history of the Island, and his involvement in improving so many aspects of the life of the Island are his legacy. To the extent that any controversy arises, as a later biographer remarks, it is "centred on his championing of ecclesiastical supervision of individual and family life, a function that was increasingly questioned in the eighteenth century". A century after he lived, he was described by John Henry Newman as being "a burning and shining light", and several of his writings were republished in Tracts for the Times. A life of Wilson by John Keble was published with his Works (Oxford, 1847–1863).

Matthew Arnold laments the obscurity into which Bishop Wilson had fallen in the preface to his own Culture and Anarchy, and praises Wilson's Maxims: "On a lower range than the Imitation, and awakening in our nature chords less poetical and delicate, the Maxims of Bishop Wilson are, as a religious work, far more solid. To the most sincere ardour and unction, Bishop Wilson unites, in these Maxims, that downright honesty and plain good sense which our English race has so powerfully applied to the divine impossibilities of religion; by which it has brought religion so much into practical life, and has done its allotted part in promoting upon earth the kingdom of God."

Bishop Wilson Theological College was established in 1879 but closed in 1943.

=== Works ===
Wilson's 'Works' were collected (under his son's direction) by Clement Cruttwell, 1781, 2 vols., including a Life (reprinted 1785, 3 vols.), and by John Keble, with additions, in the Library of Anglo-Catholic Theology, 1847–63, 7 vols, preceded by a Life, 1863, 2 vols., to which Keble had devoted sixteen years' labour. Besides works noted above, many sermons and devotional pieces, he published:

- Life, profiled to the Practical Christian, 1713, by Richard Sherlock.
- History of the Isle of Man in Gibson's (2nd) edit, of Camden's Britannia, 1722
- Observations included in Abstract of the Historical Part of the Old Testament, 1735. (His 'Notes' are in an edition of the Bible, 1785.)

Posthumous publications were:

- Sacra Privata, first published by Cruttwell, 1781.
- Maxims of Piety and Christianity, first published by Cruttwell, 1781.
- Sharmaneyn Liorsh Thomase Wilson, published once only by Cruttwell, 1783. This single volume containing 22 of Wilson's sermons in Manx was translated from English to "Gailck" (this is how Manx is referred to on the title page) by Thomas Corlett.

== See also ==
- List of the Bishops of the Diocese of Sodor and Man

== Notes ==
Church of England titles
Preceded by Baptist Levinz	Bishop of Sodor and Man; 1697–1755	Succeeded by Mark Hiddesley
