= Yverdon-Champ Pittet railway station =

Disused railway station in Yverdon-les-Bains, Switzerland

Yverdon-Champ Pittet
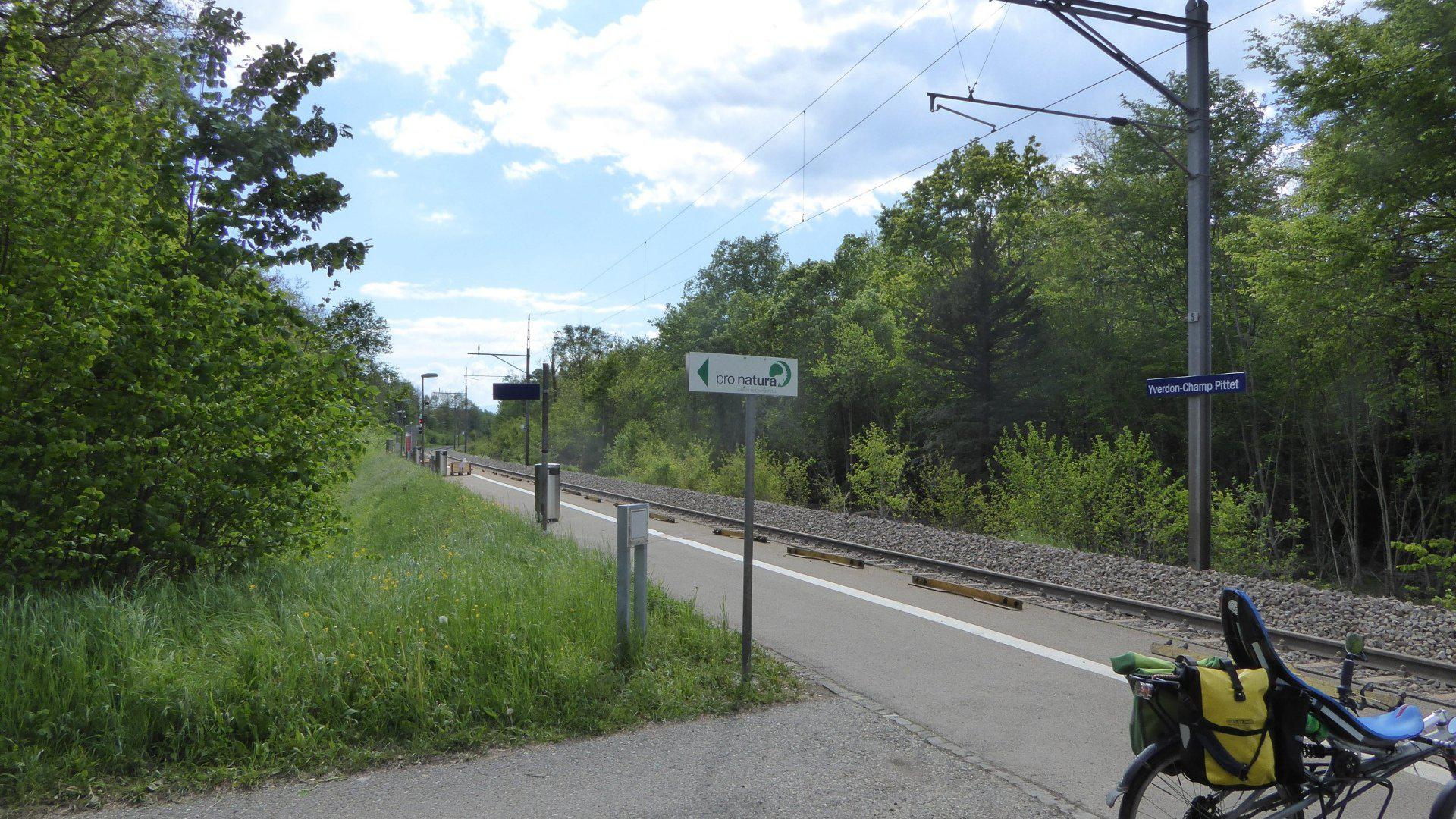
- The station platform in 2018

General information
- Other names: Yverdon-les-Bains-Champ Pittet
- Location: Yverdon-les-Bains; Switzerland
- Coordinates: 46°46′56″N 6°39′44″E
- Elevation: 433 m (1,421 ft)
- Owner: Swiss Federal Railways
- Line: Fribourg–Yverdon line
- Distance: 1.8 km (1.1 mi) from Yverdon-les-Bains
- Platforms: 1 (1 side platform)
- Tracks: 1

Construction
- Accessible: No

Other information
- Station code: 8504144 (CHP)
Location

Yverdon-Champ Pittet railway station (French: Gare d'Yverdon-Champ Pittet) is a disused railway station in the municipality of Yverdon-les-Bains, in the Swiss canton of Vaud. It is an intermediate stop on the standard gauge Fribourg–Yverdon line of Swiss Federal Railways. Rail services at this station were suspended with the December 2024 timetable change until further notice.

The long name of the station is Yverdon-les-Bains-Champ Pittet.
