= John Kelly (scholar) =

Translator of the Manx Bible

Reverend John Kelly
- Juan y Kelly
- Born: 1750; Braddan, Isle of Man
- Died: 12 November 1809 (aged 58–59); Copford, Essex, England
- Education: St John's College, Cambridge
- Spouse: Louisa Kelly

John Kelly LL.D. (1750 – 12 November 1809) was a Manx scholar, translator and clergyman.

== Early life and education ==
Kelly was born at Douglas, Isle of Man, the only son of wine cooper and farmer William Kelly and his wife Alice Kewley. He was educated by Reverend Philip Moore in the Douglas Grammar School and later at St John's College, Cambridge, where he took his LL.D degree in 1799. He was ordained in 1776 and married Louisa Dolland in 1784.

== Translation of the Bible ==
While still a teenager, Kelly worked with his former teacher Moore in the venture with other Manx scholars and clergymen to translate the Bible into Manx. Kelly contributed with a revision of the books of the Old Testament, and also the transcription, and supervision of the printing of both Testaments at Whitehaven. The Bible had been divided into different volumes to make printing and transport easier.

The manuscript translation of the Old Testament from Deuteronomy to Job was nearly destroyed when the boat that Kelly was travelling on from Douglas to Whitehaven, struck rocks and became shipwrecked. Kelly only managed to save the manuscript by holding it for five hours above the waves, before being rescued.

The translation and publication of the Bible in Manx helped to fix Manx orthography and spelling.

== Manx grammar and dictionary ==
While working on the translation of the Bible, Kelly began his work on developing a grammar for the Manx language as he found that he had nothing to aid him in his translation "except for the four Gospels". This culminated in his A Practical Grammar of the Ancient Gaelic or Language of the Isle of Man, usually called Manks published in 1804.

Kelly's major life's work was A Triglot Dictionary of the Celtic Language, as spoken in Man, Scotland, and Ireland, together with the English. During Kelly's life, the publication of this vocabulary was interrupted by a fire that destroyed the printed volumes, and part of the manuscript; it was eventually prepared and amended for an 1866 edition from the surviving two manuscripts by the Manx Society.
