= Harold Edgeworth Butler =

British classicist (1878–1951)

- Born: 8 May 1878
- Died: 5 June 1951 (aged 73); Leatherhead, Surrey, U.K.
- Spouse: Margaret Pollard (m. 1917)
- Children: 4, including David Butler
- Father: Arthur Gray Butler

Academic background
- Education: New College, Oxford

Academic work
- Institutions: New College, Oxford; University College London

Harold Edgeworth Butler (8 May 1878 – 5 June 1951) was a British Latin scholar. He studied at Oxford University and in 1899 won the Newdigate Prize for the Best Composition in English verse. He became a lecturer and fellow of New College, Oxford the same year. In 1909 he moved to University College London, and in 1911 he was appointed Professor of Latin in succession to A. E. Housman, a post he held until his retirement in 1942.

Butler was the son of the Rev. Arthur Gray Butler, the first headmaster of Haileybury College; the great-nephew of the novelist Maria Edgeworth; the second cousin once removed of the politician Rab Butler; and the father of Sir David Butler, a psephologist. He served as a lieutenant and then captain in the Royal Artillery during World War I but never saw action. In 1917 he married Margaret (Peggie) Lucy Pollard (daughter of his colleague A.F. Pollard, Professor of Constitutional History at University College London from 1903 to 1931) who had previously been one of his students. In 1919 the family moved to 16 Taviton Street in Bloomsbury to be within walking distance of his UCL office. Their four children were all educated at St Paul's School of which he was a governor. Upon retirement he and his wife moved to Dunraven, 27 St Johns Avenue, Leatherhead, Surrey.

Butler edited and translated a wide range of Latin authors in both verse and prose. On Butler's edition of Quintilian, it has been said that:

Butler worked at a time when rhetoric was a little-studied subject and Quintilian was regarded as a distinctly minor (if loquacious) Latin prose-writer. Butler often felt the need to apologize for the technicality of Quintilian's subject-matter and to add explanatory phrases to his translation of the Latin text. His text and translation, which has substantially outsold Latin-only editions, was of the greatest importance in making Quintilian available to a wider audience, and it has provided numerous students of later rhetoric with a quick way to find passages which were quarried as sources by subsequent writers. Without Butler's translation, which Russell generously calls 'eloquent', Quintilian would not so rapidly have come to be seen as a major influence on Western rhetorical and educational thinking between the Middle Ages and the nineteenth century.

== Selected publications ==
Propertius:

Sexti Properti Opera omnia: with a commentary by H.E. Butler. London: Archibald Constable, 1905

Propertius with an English translation by H.E. Butler. London: Harvard University Press, 1912 (Loeb classical library)

The elegies of Propertius edited with an introduction and commentary by H.E. Butler and E.A. Barber. Oxford: Clarendon Press, 1933

Apuleius:

The Apologia and Florida of Apuleius of Madaura translated by H.E. Butler. Oxford: Clarendon Press, 1909

The metamorphoses or Golden ass of Apuleius of Madaura translated by H.E. Butler. Oxford: Clarendon Press, 1910 (2 volumes)

Apulei Apologia: sive pro se de magia liber with introduction and commentary by H. E. Butler and A. S. Owen. Oxford: Clarendon Press, 1914

Cupid & Psyche: partly in the original and partly in translation with notes and introduction by H.E. Butler. Oxford: at the Clarendon Press, 1922

Post-Augustan poetry:

Post-Augustan poetry from Seneca to Juvenal by H.E. Butler. Oxford: at the Clarendon Press, 1909

Virgil:

The shorter Aeneid selected and arranged with brief notes, by H.H. Hardy; with a preface and introduction by H.E. Butler. London: G. Bell, 1914

The sixth book of the Aeneid. Virgil, with introduction and notes by H.E. Butler. Oxford: Blackwell, 1920

The fourth book of Virgil's Aeneid edited by H.E. Butler. Oxford: Basil Blackwell, 1935

Quintilian:

The Institutio oratoria of Quintilian with an English translation by H.E. Butler. London: Heinemann; New York: Putnam's Sons (Loeb classical library), 4 vols, 1920-1922

Sallust & Cicero:

The Catilinarian conspiracy from Sallust & Cicero: partly in the original and partly in translation edited by H.E. Butler. Oxford: at the Clarendon Press, 1921

Sallust:

The Jugurthine War: partly in the original and partly in translation. Sallust; edited by H. E. Butler. Oxford: Clarendon Press, 1921

Cicero:

M. Tulli Ciceronis De provinciis consularibus oratio ad Senatum edited with introduction, notes and appendices by H. E. Butler and M. Cary. Oxford: at the Clarendon Press, 1924 (reprinted New York: Arno Press, 1979)

Livy:

The close of the second Punic war: being Livy books XXIX, XXX partly in the original and partly in translation, edited by H.E. Butler. Oxford: at the Clarendon Press, 1925

Livy, book XXX edited by H.E. Butler ... and H.H. Scullard ...; with a map and 3 plans. London: Methuen & Co. Ltd, [1939?]

Suetonius:

C. Suetoni Tranquilli Divus Iulius edited with an introduction and commentary by H. E. Butler and M. Cary. Oxford: Clarendon Press, 1927 (later edition with additions by G.B. Townend: Bristol: Bristol Classical Press, 1982)

Horace:

The Odes of Horace: in English verse. Latin text with translations by various hands, chosen by H.E. Butler. London: G. Bell & Sons Ltd., 1929

Medieval and Modern subjects:

Five Stuart princesses Margaret of Scotland, Elizabeth of Bohemia, Mary of Orange, Henrietta of Orleans, Sophie of Hanover edited by Robert S. Rait. New-York: E.P. Dutton & Co., 1902 (essay on Margaret of Scotland by H.E. Butler)

War songs of Britain, selected by H.E. Butler. London: Archibald Constable & Co., 1903

The Black book of Edgeworthstown and other Edgeworth memories, 1585-1817 edited by Harriet Jessie Butler and Harold Edgeworth Butler. London: Faber and Gwyer, [1927]

The autobiography of Giraldus Cambrensis edited and translated by H. E. Butler; with an introductory chapter by C. H. Williams. London: Jonathan Cape, [1937]

The chronicle of Jocelin of Brakelond: concerning the acts of Samson, abbot of the monastery of St. Edmund translated from the Latin with introduction, notes and appendices by H. E. Butler. London; New York: T. Nelson, [1949]

Tour in Connemara, and The Martins of Ballinahinch by Maria Edgeworth; edited by Harold Edgeworth Butler. London: Constable, 1950

The letters of John of Salisbury Vol.1, The early letters (1153-1161) edited by W. J. Millor and H. E. Butler; revised by C. N. L. Brooke. London: Thomas Nelson, 1955 (reissued with a second volume, Oxford: Clarendon Press, 1986)
