= Arthur Gray Butler =

English academic and cleric (1831–1909)

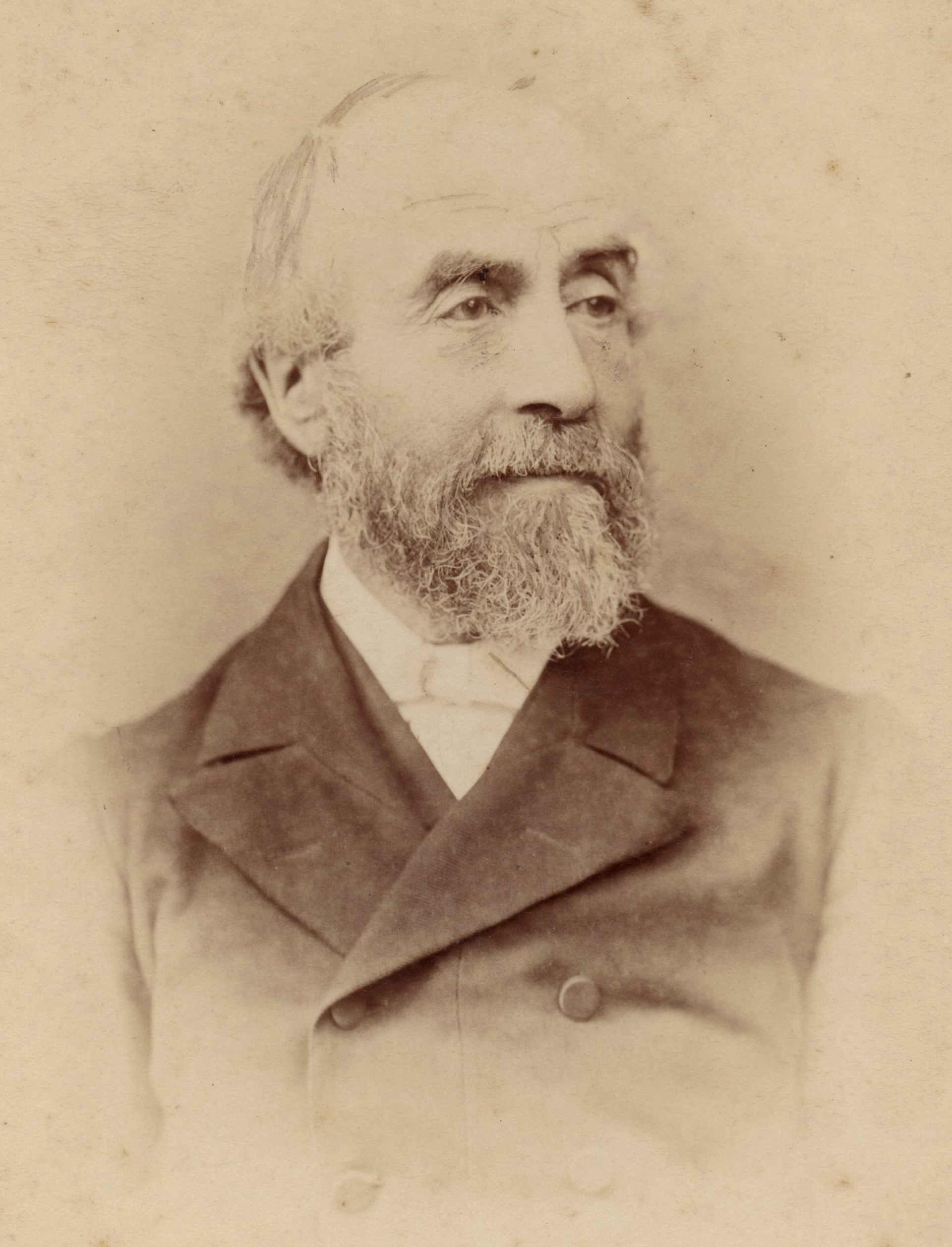
- Butler in the 1880s
- Born: 19 August 1831; Gayton, Northamptonshire, England
- Died: 16 January 1909 (aged 77); Torquay, Devon, England
- Occupations: Academic, Cleric, Headmaster
- Known for: First headmaster of Haileybury College
- Spouse: Harriet Jessie Edgeworth (m. 1877)
- Children: 4, including Harold
- Parents: George Butler; Sarah Maria Gray

Academic background
- Education: University College, Oxford

Arthur Gray Butler (19 August 1831 – 16 January 1909) was an English academic and cleric, the first headmaster of Haileybury College.

== Life ==
Born at the rectory, Gayton, Northamptonshire, on 19 August 1831, he was the third son of George Butler, Dean of Peterborough, and his wife Sarah Maria Gray, eldest daughter of John Gray of Wembley Park, Middlesex. His youngest brother, Henry Montagu Butler, became Master of Trinity College, Cambridge. He entered Rugby School under A. C. Tait in August 1844, and was admitted as a scholar of University College, Oxford, in March 1850.

At Oxford, Gray was an original member of the Essay Club founded in 1852 by his friend George Joachim Goschen, and was president of the Oxford Union in 1853. In the same year, he won the Ireland scholarship, and graduated B.A. with a first class in the final classical school. He was elected a fellow of Oriel College, Oxford in 1856, proceeding M.A. in the following year. He did not reside on his fellowship: returning to Rugby School in 1858, he served as assistant master under Frederick Temple, and was ordained deacon in 1861 and priest in 1862.

On the reconstitution of Haileybury College in 1862, Butler was appointed the first headmaster. In September, the school took over the buildings of the East India College near Hertford, founded in 1805 for the training of the East India Company's civil servants. Haileybury had no endowment, and inconvenient infrastructure. Butler introduced the Rugby School system, and himself served as school chaplain. He provided racquets and fives courts. The houses were named after prominent British officials in India.

Pupil numbers rose in a few years from 54 to 360. Butler was a stimulating classical teacher, but a breakdown in health compelled his resignation in December 1867. By that time, Haileybury was a recognised English public school.

On resuming work in 1874, Butler served as chaplain of the Royal Indian Civil Engineering College, which was established at Coopers Hill near Egham in 1871. Returning to Oxford in 1875, he settled as dean and tutor at Oriel. He was select preacher before the university in 1885 as well as Whitehall preacher. A liberal in politics, he promoted better housing of the poor and the higher education of women in Oxford. Over the Irish home rule issue, he became a Liberal Unionist.

He resigned his official position in 1895; it was partly under his influence that Oriel College and the university benefited by the will of Cecil Rhodes. He was elected to an honorary fellowship at Oriel in 1907.

Butler died at Torquay on 16 January 1909, and was buried in Holywell cemetery, Oxford. At Haileybury, his name was commemorated by the Butler prizes for English literature. In 1910, a fund was raised by former pupils to found a Butler scholarship, and a tablet was erected to his memory in the chapel.

== Works ==
Butler published two dramas, Charles I (1874; 2nd edit. 1907) and Harold (1892; 2nd edit. 1906), and two volumes of verse entitled The Choice of Achilles (1900) and Hodge and the Land (1907). In The Three Friends: a Story of Rugby in the Forties (1900), he recorded the effect produced on his contemporaries by the early poems of Alfred Tennyson. It also documented the early friendships of Matthew Arnold, A. H. Clough, and Theodore Walrond.

== Family ==
On 4 April 1877, Butler married Harriet Jessie Edgeworth, daughter of Michael Pakenham Edgeworth and niece of Maria Edgeworth, who survived him with one son and three daughters. Their son, Harold Edgeworth Butler, became professor of Latin at University College, London, in 1911. Their daughters, Ruth Florence Butler (1881-1982) and Christina Violet Butler (1884-1982) were both social activists and local historians who contributed to the Victoria history of the county of Gloucester (1907)
