= Sidney Ball =

British academic and socialist reformer (1857–1918)

Sidney Ball (20 April 1857 – 23 May 1918) was a British academic and socialist activist.

Born in Pershore, Ball was educated at Wellington College and then Oriel College, Oxford, where he graduated with a First in Classical Moderations (1877) and a Second in Literae Humaniores ('Greats, a combination of philosophy and ancient history) in 1879. In 1882, he became a fellow of St John's College, Oxford, and a tutor in 1885, later becoming St John's senior tutor.

In 1886, Ball joined the Fabian Society, and he devoted much spare time to the group for the remainder of his life. He wrote "The Moral Aspects of Socialism", a tract published by the Fabians in 1896, and in 1907 was elected to the group's executive, with the support of H. G. Wells. However, being based in Oxford, he found it difficult to attend regular meetings in London, and left the committee the next year.

In 1895, Ball was a founding member of the Oxford University Fabian Society and remained a leading figure in the group until his death. In 1909, he was expected to win election as president of St John's, but was defeated after controversy over his socialist views. He was also the treasurer of the Oxford Union, a strong supporter of Ruskin College, and served for several years on the Hebdomadal Council.

L. E. Jones makes reference to Ball in An Edwardian Youth:

Professor (sic) Ball lectured on Moral Philosophy, but at dictation speed, for he expected us to report to him ourselves verbatim in our note-books

.
