= Philip Moore (scholar) =

Revered Philip Moore
- Born: 1705; Douglas
- Died: 1783 (aged 77–78)
- Burial place: Kirk Braddan
- Occupations: Clergyman, Biblical scholar
- Known for: Translation of the Manx Bible

Philip Moore (1705 - 1783) was a Manx clergyman and scholar who a central figure in the translation of the Bible in to the Manx language.

He was born in 1705 to Robert Moore and his wife Catherine Kelly. He attended the Grammar School in Douglas, which was founded by Bishop Thomas Wilson. He was ordained 1739. He died in 1783 and was buried in Kirk Braddan churchyard.

Moore contributed a large share of the translation of the Bible into the Manx language. He translated part of the Book of Psalms and Acts. Moore also revised the translation of the Old Testament, as well as the second edition of the New Testament. Although many of the translators of the Manx Bible did not know Latin not Greek, it is probable that Moore did.
