= François-Rodolphe de Weiss =

Swiss military officer (1751–1818)

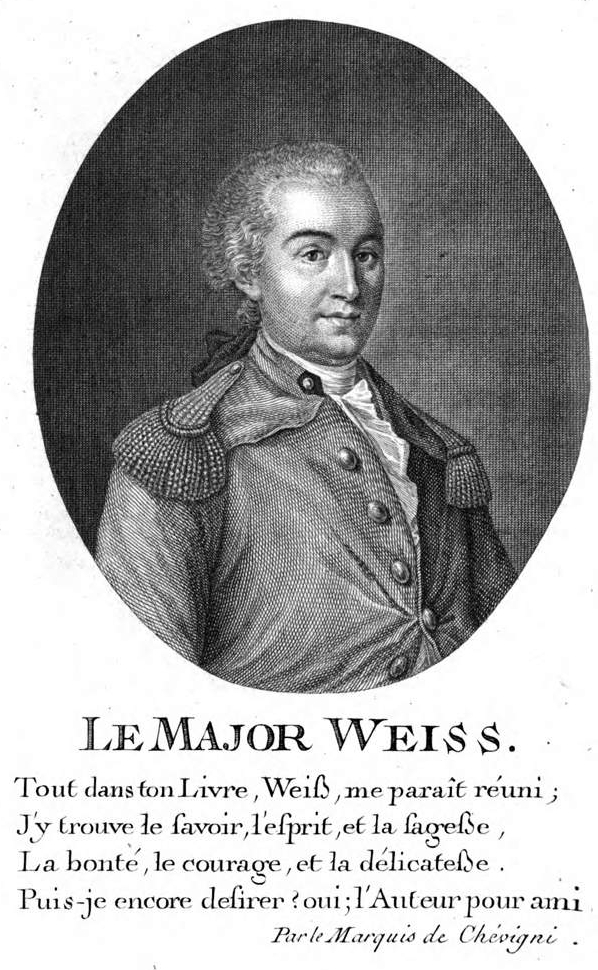
François-Rodolphe de Weiss

François-Rodolphe de Weiss (von Weiss, also von Weiß, surname at birth Wyss) (1751–1818) was a Swiss military officer, diplomat, writer, philosopher, and a follower of Jean-Jacques Rousseau.

== Life ==
He was born at Yverdon, son of François Rodolphe, seigneur de Daillens, and Henriette Russillon. He entered French military service in 1766, and Prussian in 1777. In 1785 he became a member of the Grand Conseil at Bern.

A supporter of the ideas of the French Revolution, de Weiss was sent to Paris as an envoy in 1792, and maintained a peace between France and the Swiss confederation. In 1794 he attributed the Revolution to ideas emanating from Geneva.

In 1798 the Bernese bailiwick at Lucens Castle was ended by a popular uprising, with Weiss defending the castle.

Weiss then went into exile, in Germany. He died by suicide at Coppet on 21 July 1818.

== Works ==
- Principes philosophiques, politiques et moraux, 2 vol. (1785). A successful work of philosophy in the style of the 18th century, translated into German and English.
- Réveillez-vous Suisses, le danger approche (1798), Lyon, Imprimerie Franoy. This work was published in January 1798 during the Diet of Aarau, called to consider political reform.
