= Sang Bleu =

Sang Bleu (French pronunciation: [sɑ̃ blø]; lit. "Blue Blood") is an independent, multi-disciplinary media platform and creative agency. Encompassing Sang Bleu magazine: a publication centred around contemporary art, culture, fashion, fine art, performance art, literature, sociology, kink and tattooing; SangBleu, a typeface under the type design company Swiss Typeface and a creative agency called Sang Bleu. Sang Bleu was initiated in 2006 in London, UK, by Maxime Plescia-Büchi, its Swiss creative director who currently runs it with his wife Hope Plescia-Büchi. Büchi works as a tattoo artist at Sang Bleu London together with a dozen other tattoo artists and temporary resident artists. Sang Bleu is notable for its publications, its collaboration with Swiss luxury watchmaker Hublot, and its work on celebrities like Kanye West and FKA Twigs. Sang Bleu is also known for creating logos and corporate typefaces for Balenciaga, Rick Owens, CSS Bard Hessel Museum, the City of Stockholm, Esquire magazine and Vogue. It has held events at department stores including Selfridges, the London Edition Hotel and Imperial Art Studios in Downtown Los Angeles. Sang Bleu London opened in 2013. In May 2016, the first international Sang Bleu studio opened in Zürich, Switzerland. A third location opened in Los Angeles in 2019.
