= Weeden Butler =

English cleric and writer

Weeden Butler the elder (1742–1823) was an English cleric and writer.

== Life ==
Butler was born at Margate on 22 September 1742. Orphaned as a young child, he was later articled to the attorney Benjamin Rosewell in London, but left the legal profession for the church. He acted as amanuensis to William Dodd, the clerical fraudster, from 1764 until Dodd was hanged in 1777. In 1776, he had succeeded Dodd as the morning preacher at the Charlotte Street chapel in Pimlico, a fashionable place of worship. He officiated here until 1814.

In 1778, Butler was the lecturer at St Clement Eastcheap and St Martin Orgars, and for more than 40 years he was the master of a classical school in Chelsea. Located in Cheyne Walk, students of the school included Thomas Butler, son of Pierce Butler.

In 1814, Butler retired to Gayton, Northamptonshire, where he acted as curate to his son until 1820. Then, in poor health, he went at first to the Isle of Wight, then to Bristol, then finally to Greenhill, Harrow, where he died on 14 July 1823. He was chaplain to the Duke of Kent and the Queen's Volunteers.

== Works ==
Butler's works were:

- The Cheltenham Guide, London, 1781 (anon.).
- Account of the Life and Writings of the Rev. George Stanhope, D.D., Dean of Canterbury, London, 1797, (anon.); on George Stanhope.
- Memoir of Mark Hildesley, D.D., Bishop of Sodor and Man, London, 1799; on Mark Hildesley.
- Pleasing Recollections, or a Walk through the British Musæum. An interlude of two acts, British Library Addit. MS. 27276.
- Poems left in manuscript, including The Syracusan, a tragedy, and Sir Roger de Coverley, a comedy.

Butler assisted his friend James Neild with editorial work. He also prepared editions of John Jortin's Tracts, 2 vols. 1790, and Joseph Wilcocks's Roman Conversations, 2 vols. 1797.

== Family ==
He was father of Weeden Butler the younger, and of George Butler, headmaster of Harrow School.

== Notes ==
Attribution

This article incorporates text from a publication now in the public domain: Stephen, Leslie, ed. (1886). "Butler, Weeden (1742-1823)". Dictionary of National Biography. Vol. 8. London: Smith, Elder & Co.
