= Michael Heweton =

Archdeacon of Armagh from 1693 to 1700

Michael Heweton (also Hewetson or Heweston; 1643-1724) was Archdeacon of Armagh from 1693 to 1700.

Hewetson was born in Dublin on 7 July 1643 and educated at Trinity College, Dublin. He was Chaplain to Archbishop Michael Boyle; and held the living at Cloghran. He died unmarried at Ballyshannon in 1724.
