= George Butler (headmaster) =

English schoolmaster and divine

- Born: 5 July 1774; Pimlico, London
- Died: 30 April 1853 (aged 78); Peterborough
- Occupations: Schoolmaster, priest
- Children: Henry Montagu Butler; George Butler
- Parent: Weeden Butler

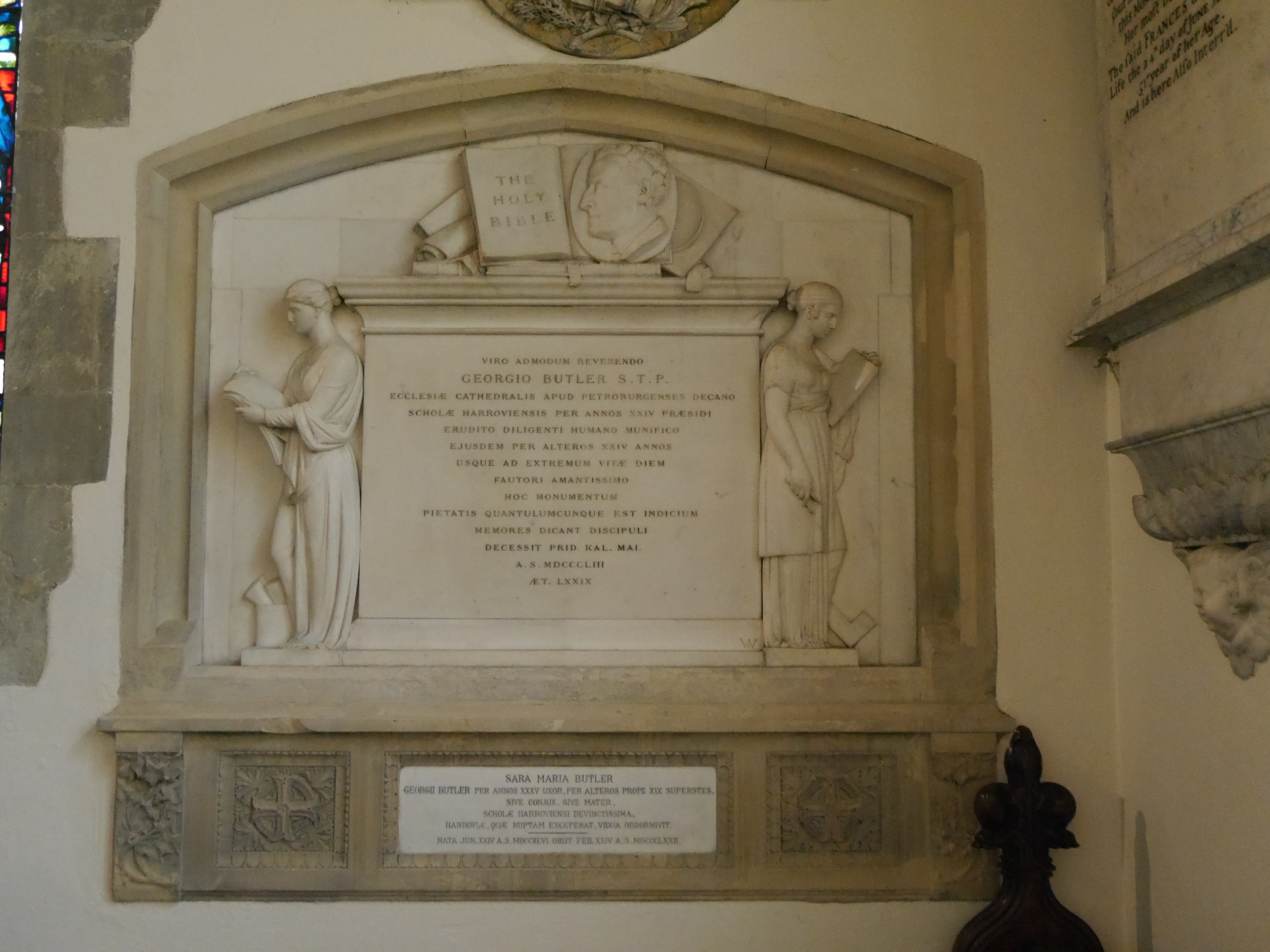
George Butler memorial, St Mary's, Harrow on the Hill

George Butler (5 July 1774 – 30 April 1853) was an English schoolmaster and Anglican priest, Headmaster of Harrow School from 1805 to 1829 and Dean of Peterborough from 1842 to his death in 1853.

== Biography ==
The son of Weeden Butler (1742–1823), George Butler was educated at the Chelsea school where his father taught and proceeded to Sidney Sussex College, Cambridge, where he graduated senior wrangler in 1794 (M.A. 1797; B.D. 1804; D.D. (litterae regiae) 1805). He became a fellow of Sidney Sussex, first as mathematical lecturer, and afterwards as classical tutor. He was elected a public examiner of the university in 1804, and in the following year was one of the select preachers. As headmaster of Harrow School (1805–1829) his all-round knowledge, his tact and his skill as a track and field athlete rendered his administration successful and popular. On his retirement he settled down at Gayton, Northamptonshire, a living which had been presented to him by his college in 1814. In 1836 he became chancellor of the diocese of Peterborough, and in 1842 was appointed dean of Peterborough. His few publications include some notes of Harrow, entitled Harrow, a Selection of Lists of the School between 1770 and 1828 (Peterborough, 1849).

== Personal life ==
Butler and his wife Sarah Maria Gray had four sons and at least three daughters:

- The Rev. Dr. George Butler (1819–1890), principal of Liverpool College (1866–1882) and canon of Winchester, whose wife, Josephine Butler, was a noted campaigner for the welfare of prostitutes
- Spencer Perceval Butler (1828–1915), lawyer and administrator, father of Sir Cyril Kendall Butler, Sir Spencer Harcourt Butler, Sir Montagu Sherard Dawes Butler and Sir George Geoffrey Gilbert Butler, and grandfather of the Conservative politician Richard Austen Butler
- The Rev. Arthur Gray Butler (1831–1909), Headmaster of Haileybury College and Dean of Oriel College, Oxford.
- The Rev. Dr. Henry Montagu Butler (1833–1918), Headmaster of Harrow School, Dean of Gloucester and Master of Trinity College, Cambridge.
- Louisa Jane Butler (1822-1897), who in 1853 married the statistician, sociologist, anthropologist and eugenicist Francis Galton
- Emily Butler (born in or about 1829)
- Gertrude Maria Butler (born in or about 1835)

Academic offices
Preceded by Joseph Drury	Head Master of Harrow School; 1805–1829	Succeeded by Charles Longley
Church of England titles
Preceded by Thomas Turton	Dean of Peterborough; 1842–1853	Succeeded by Augustus Saunders
