= St. Brendan's (disambiguation) =

Saint Brendan's is an Irish cream liqueur.

St. Brendan's or Saint Brendan or variation, may also refer to:

== People ==
- St. Brendan the Voyager Navigator of Clonfert (c. AD 484–c. 577), Irish monastic saint
- Saint Brendan of Birr (died 573), Abbot of Birr in Co. Offaly, contemporaneous with the above

== Places ==
- St. Brendan's, Newfoundland and Labrador, Canada
- Saint Brendan's Island, a phantom island
- St Brendan's Park, Ireland

== Institutions ==
- Saint Brendan Church (disambiguation)
- St. Brendan's College (disambiguation)
- St. Brendan's Sixth Form College, Bristol, England
- St. Brendan High School, a catholic high school in Miami, Florida, U.S.
- St. Brendan School, a catholic college-preparatory school in Riverside, Rhode Island, U.S.
- St. Brendan's Hospital (disambiguation)

== Other uses ==
- St Brendan's GAA (disambiguation)

== See also ==
- Brendan (disambiguation)
- Saint Brandon of Man, Bishop of Man
