= Edward Gee =

Edward Gee may refer to:

- Edward Gee (priest, born 1657) (1657–1730), English churchman
- Edward Gee (priest, born 1565) (1565–1618), English cleric and academic
- Edward Gee of Eccleston (1613–1660), English presbyterian minister
- Edward Pritchard Gee (1904–1968), Anglo-Indian tea-planter and naturalist in Assam
