= John Salisbury (bishop) =

Welsh clergyman

- Bishop of Sodor and Man
- In office: 1570 to 1573 (death)
- Predecessor: Thomas Stanley (bishop)
- Successor: Henry Man
- Previous posts: Bishop of Thetford; Dean of Norwich; Archdeacon of Anglesey

Personal details
- Born: Wales
- Died: September 1573
- Buried: Norwich Cathedral

Styles of John Salisbury
- Reference style: The Right Reverend
- Spoken style: My Lord
- Religious style: Bishop

John Salisbury, O.Praem (died 1573) was a Welsh clergyman who held high office in the pre- and post-Reformation church in England.

He was the last Abbot of Titchfield, a Premonstratensian house; the abbey was dissolved in December 1537. Under the provisions of the Suffragan Bishops Act 1534, he was appointed and consecrated Bishop of Thetford on 19 March 1536. Three years later, he was also appointed Dean of Norwich on 20 August 1539, but in the reign of Queen Mary I, he was deprived of the deanery in early 1554. After the accession of Queen Elizabeth I, he was restored as Dean in 1559. He was also Chancellor of Lincoln Cathedral and Archdeacon of Anglesey.

He was nominated Bishop of Sodor and Man on 27 March 1570, which was confirmed on 7 April 1570. Whilst bishop, he continued to hold the deanery of Norwich "in commendam".

He died in September 1573 and was buried in Norwich Cathedral.
