= John Howden =

John Howden may refer to:

- John Power Howden (1879–1959), Canadian MP
- John Howden (bishop), bishop of Sodor and Man
- John of Howden (died 1275), English Franciscan friar
- John Howden (MP for City of York) for City of York
