= Anthony Ascham =

British academic, political theorist, Parliamentarian, and diplomat

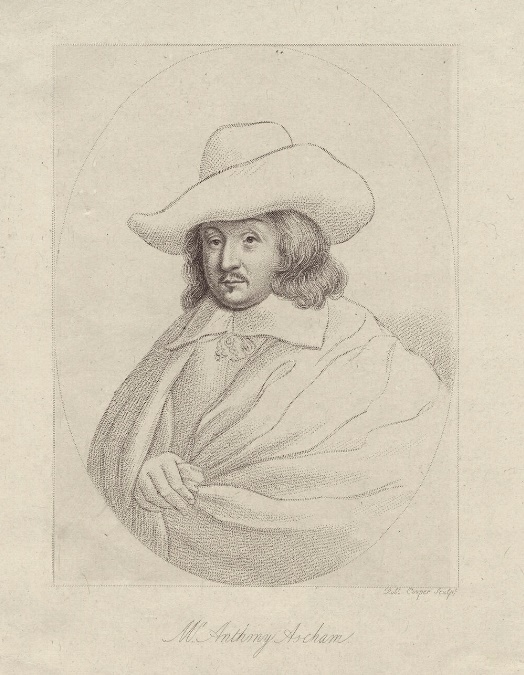
Anthony Ascham by Robert Cooper

Anthony Ascham (c. 1614 – 27 May 1650) was an English academic, political theorist, Parliamentarian and diplomat.

== Life ==
He was probably born on 6 March 1613/1614, the younger son of Thomas Ascham, an alderman of Boston, Lincolnshire. He was educated at Eton and in 1634 went as a King's Scholar to King's College, Cambridge, becoming a BA in 1638 and an MA in 1642, and then a Fellow of his college until his death.

According to Anthony à Wood he

"closed with the Presbyterian in the beginning of the rebellion, took the covenant, sided with the Independents, became a great creature of the long parliament by whose authority he was made tutor to James, Duke of York), and an active person against his sovereign".

His appointment as tutor dated from 1646. James, Duke of York was the future King James. He also tutored James's brother Henry Stuart, Duke of Gloucester. Ascham's reward for his support of the republican Commonwealth was to be appointed as a trade representative to the Hanseatic League in Hamburg in 1649. In 1650, he was appointed to represent the Commonwealth of England in Spain, but he never presented his credentials to the Court as he was murdered by a group of six Royalists émigrés in an Inn in Madrid on 27 May. Accounts of the subsequent trial by Agustin de Hierro were published in English and Spanish, and by Vicente Bañuelos in Spanish. His murderers were excluded from the general pardon issued to royalists in 1652.

== Works ==
In 1647 Ascham prepared a manuscript treatise On Marriage that remained unpublished. His first published work was A Discourse, wherein is examined what is particularly lawfull during the Confusions and Revolutions of Government. This appeared in 1648, probably in July at the height of the political uncertainty engendered by the second Civil War. The previous month the Army had shown that it wielded both political and military power and Ascham's Discourse was widely seen as a defence of the Army as the conquering power, and as a plea for "the rank of the people" to adopt a position of political quiescence.

Parliament's ultimate victory and the establishment of the Commonwealth posed a problem for those who felt unable to accept the legality of the new government but were now being required to give it their allegiance, and also for those who regarded their oath of allegiance to King Charles I Charles I of England as a solemn oath to God that could not be broken. One argument, provided by a group of political theorists variously called the Engagers or de facto theorists, was to argue that an individual could give their obedience to the de facto government in being simply because it was in power.

For many such a theory was deeply shocking since it emphasised power at the expense of authority, and subordinated allegiance to self-interest. The debate was initiated by Francis Rous who published a brief pamphlet in April 1649 in which he argued that allegiance could be given to the Commonwealth even though it were acknowledged to be an illegal power. It was a radical shift in the basis of the argument that was to be followed through by theorists engaged in the debate on de facto government.

In the debate that followed Ascham played a major part in developing a theory of political obligation to the de facto power. In 1649 it is possible that he was author of a short anonymous pamphlet, A Combate between Two Seconds. One for Obeying the Present Government. The Other the second part of a Demurrer undeservedly called Religious, which was published in July. This work firstly took issue with those whose arguments continued to be based on Romans 13: 1–2 and in particular addressed the arguments in an anonymous work that may have been published in two parts, but that is extant only in its second part entitled The Second Part of the Religious Demurrer; and secondly bypassed the critical emphasis on Romans 13: 1–2 to develop arguments based on the need to protect oneself from chaos, as originally deployed by Ascham in his 1648 Discourse.

Having thus entered the pamphlet "war", Ascham then began to expand his arguments. He was certainly the author of a longer pamphlet, The Bounds and Bonds of Publique Obedience, which appeared in August 1649; and by November he had added nine chapters to his 1648 Discourse, which now appeared under the title Of the Confusions and Revolutions of Goverment [sic]. This work attracted the attention of Robert Sanderson who criticised it in a short and pungent pamphlet. Ascham's Reply to a paper of Dr Sandersons, containing a censure of Mr A. A. his book of the Confusions and revolution of Government (sic), which was published on 9 January 1650, was directed as much as against Edward Gee's Exercitation concerning usurped powers as against Sanderson's work. In these works Ascham's essential argument was that in a situation in which people had to look after their own safety, they were justified in giving their allegiance to any power that was capable of protecting them, whatever the legality of its title to power.

By the autumn of 1649 the debate began to centre on the specific question of the Oath of Allegiance and the Engagement to the Commonwealth: Two Acts of Parliament were passed requiring people to take an Oath of Allegiance to the Commonwealth, on 11/12 October 1649, and on 2 January 1650. Conventionally Oaths were regarded as "the strictest Ties and Obligations that a man can be under". For many the Engagement to the Commonwealth was impossible to take because it overrode their prior obligation to the monarchy (King Charles I and his heirs). The Presbyterian Richard Baxter held that he "could not judge it seemly for him that believed there is a God to play fast and loose with a dreadful oath". In contrast, Ascham argued that all oaths involved tacit conditions, of which the ability of the government to protect the people was the main one. A government that could not protect its people lost the right to their allegiance.

Ascham's 1648 Discourse was to be republished, anonymously, following the ousting of King James II. Then the question of the legality of the oath of allegiance to King William and Queen Mary had come to the fore. It did not, however, generate any discussion. By then the leading theorist in the field was Thomas Hobbes, whose De Corpore Politico, De Cive (first edition), and Leviathan, had systematised a coherent and secular defence of the contract as between ruler and ruled.

A portrait engraving of Anthony Ascham by Robert Cooper can be found in the Archive Collection of NPG (NPG D29012).
