= Brendan =

Brendan may refer to:

== People ==
- Saint Brendan the Navigator (c. 484–c. 577), Irish monastic saint.
- Saint Brendan of Birr (died 573), Abbot of Birr, County Offaly
- Brendan (given name), a masculine given name in the English language

== Other uses ==
- Brendan and the Secret of Kells, an animated feature film
- Brendan Airways, parent company of USA3000 Airlines
- Storm Brendan (disambiguation), various storms

== See also ==
- St. Brendan's (disambiguation)
