= Richard Oldham (bishop) =

Richard Oldham O.S.B
- Bishop of Sodor and Man
- Appointed: 21 June 1458
- In office: 1478 to 1485/86
- Predecessor: Thomas Burton
- Successor: Richard Oldham (bishop)
- Other post: Abbot of Chester

Personal details
- Died: 1485/86
- Buried: Chester Cathedral
- Denomination: Roman Catholic

Styles of Richard Oldham
- Reference style: The Right Reverend
- Spoken style: My Lord
- Religious style: Bishop

Richard Oldham (died 1485/86) was a pre-Reformation cleric who served as the Bishop of Sodor and Man in the second half of the 15th century.

He was elected Abbot of Chester in 1455 and appointed Bishop of Sodor and Man on 11 or 15 February 1478, holding both posts until his death. Contemporary records reveal some acrimony between Oldham and the townsfolk of Chester. In 1474 and 1478, the Exchequer of Chester guaranteed his safety and that of his monks, and in a later turnaround of events in 1480 he and twelve fellow monks were themselves bound over to keep the peace in the city.

He died in office either on 13 October 1485 or 19 September 1486 and was buried at Chester Abbey.

Catholic Church titles
Preceded by Thomas Kirkham	Bishop of Sodor and Man; 1478–1485/86	Succeeded by Huan Blackleach
