= Thomas Drury (bishop) =

British Anglican bishop (1847–1926)

Thomas Wortley Drury
- Bishop of Sodor and Man
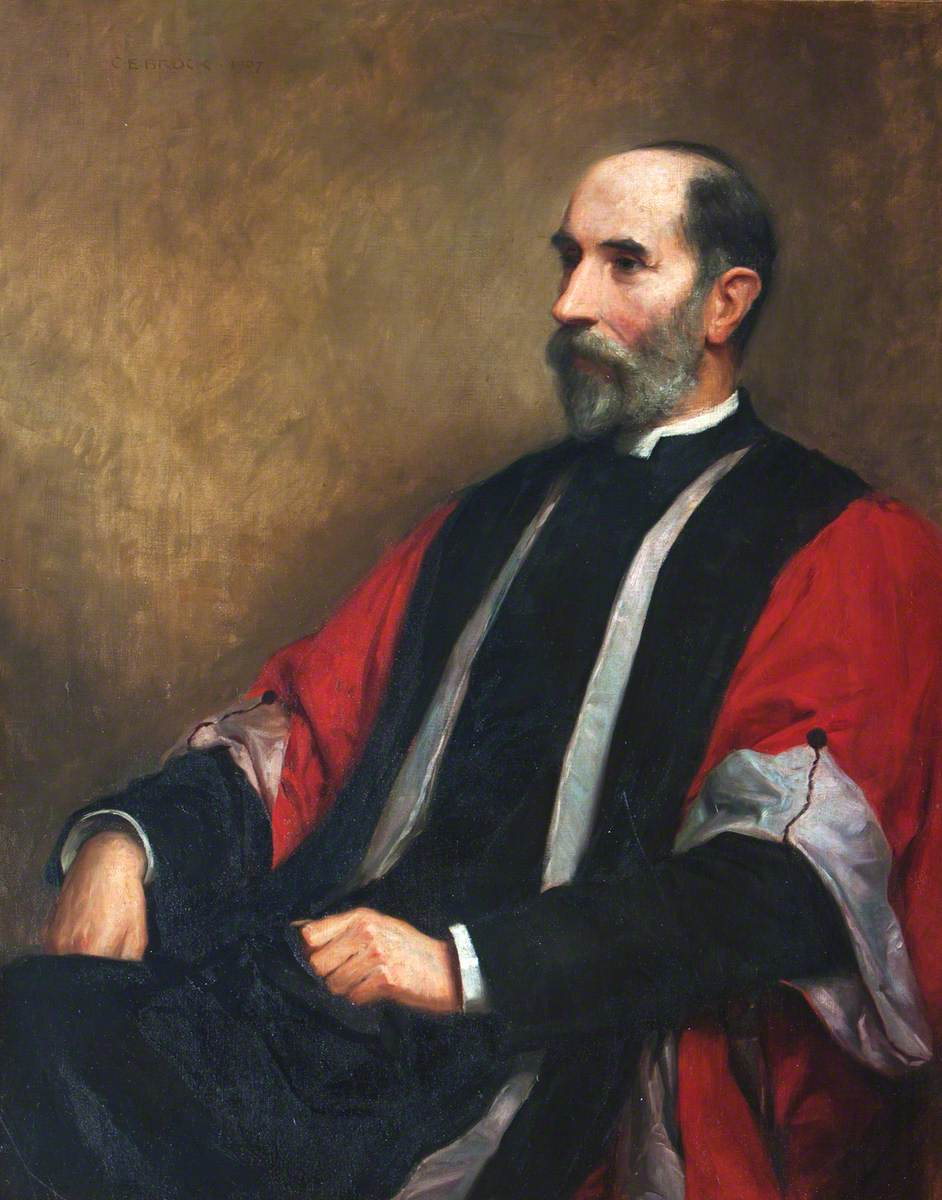
- Installed: 1907
- Term ended: 1911
- Predecessor: Norman Dumenil John Straton
- Successor: James Denton Thompson

Personal details
- Born: 12 September 1847
- Died: 12 February 1926 (aged 78)
- Spouse: Catherine Beatrice Drury
- Education: King William's College; Christ's College, Cambridge

Thomas Wortley Drury (12 September 1847 – 12 February 1926) was a British Anglican bishop who served as Master of St Catharine's College, Cambridge from 1920.

== Life to 1914 ==
He was born on the Isle of Man the son of the Rev. William Drury, Vicar of Braddan. He was educated at King William's College and Christ's College, Cambridge.

Ordained deacon in 1871, by Bishop Horatio Powys of Sodor and Man, Drury's first post was as a curate at Braddan. Priested at St Thomas the Apostle, Douglas, Isle of Man in 1872, he served as Chaplain to the Insane Asylum 1872 to 1874, after which he was mathematical master of King William's College. Following this he was rector of Holy Trinity Church, Chesterfield from 1876 to 1882, then Principal of the Church Missionary College in Islington from 1882 to 1899.

Drury was an Examining Chaplain to Bishop Ryle of Liverpool from 1892 onwards. Between 1899 and 1907 he was Principal of Ridley Hall, Cambridge. Ordained in 1907 to the episcopate as the Bishop of Sodor and Man, he held the post for four years. In 1911 he was translated to become the Bishop of Ripon.

== World War I ==
Drury was a strong supporter of British entry to the Great War. Although his wife died on 29 July 1914, Drury prepared an article for the monthly diocesan gazette published in September, 1914. He wrote that it was the duty of the nation to respond to the national call for a much increased army. ‘This rests not only on those of the age required, but in great measure on parents and friends who may largely help or hinder the loyal response which should be far more widely given and be given without delay’. This appeal to the families and friends of young men not to stand in the way of voluntary recruitment was used by other bishops and clergymen.

Pressure for volunteers to join the army continued for over two years before conscription was introduced. Criticism of the clergy for encouraging recruitment when clerics were under orders not to volunteer themselves as combatants brought the following response from Drury ‘The call for more men is still most urgent. It is hard to press this point when one cannot fight oneself, but many of us have readily given our sons to the cause, and we must not fail to press home the call where it has fallen on deaf ears.’ Both of Drury’s sons were engaged in the War, Edward as a Lt-Commander in the Royal Navy on HMS EURYALUS and Braddan in the Indian Police. Criticism of clergy resulted in a Roll of Honour being created in the diocese on which names of clergy and their families serving in the British forces were listed. They included those who were killed and wounded.

One of Drury’s main occupations centred on providing for the army camps in the Ripon, Richmond and Catterick areas. Tens of thousands of men were trained in these camps, and the diocese, with the support of Wakefield diocese, provided huts, leisure activities, clergy and other volunteers to support the many young men far from home.

== Death ==
A Sub-Prelate of the Order of St John of Jerusalem, he died at the Master's Lodge at St Catharine's.

Styles of Thomas Drury
- Reference style: The Right Reverend
- Spoken style: My Lord
- Religious style: Bishop

== Family ==
Drury married in 1872 Catherine Beatrice (died 1914), daughter of Captain Edward Dumergue of the Madras Army, and his wife Elizabeth Anne Perry. They had two sons and five daughters. Their daughter, Isabel Wortley Drury, was the wife of Charles Lisle Carr, later Bishop of Coventry and then of Hertford.

He was the father-in-law of the Rev. Arthur Tait, Principal of Ridley Hall, Cambridge, whose daughter Margaret married the university administrator Bertrand Hallward.

== Publications ==
- How We Got Our Prayer Book
- Confession and Absolution: the teaching of the Church of England, as interpreted and illustrated by the writings of the reformers of the sixteenth century
- Elevation in the Eucharist : Its History and Rationale
- English Church Teaching on Faith, Life and Order

Church of England titles
Preceded by Norman Dumenil Straton	Bishop of Sodor and Man; 1907 – 1911	Succeeded by James Denton Thompson
Preceded by William Boyd Carpenter	Bishop of Ripon; 1911 – 1920	Succeeded by Thomas Banks Strong
Academic offices
Preceded by Claude Hermann Walter Johns	Master of St Catharine's College, Cambridge; 1920–1926	Succeeded by Frederick Margetson Rushmore
