= Daliburgh =

Coordinates: 57.168°N 7.372°W

Daliburgh: Scottish Gaelic: Dalabrog
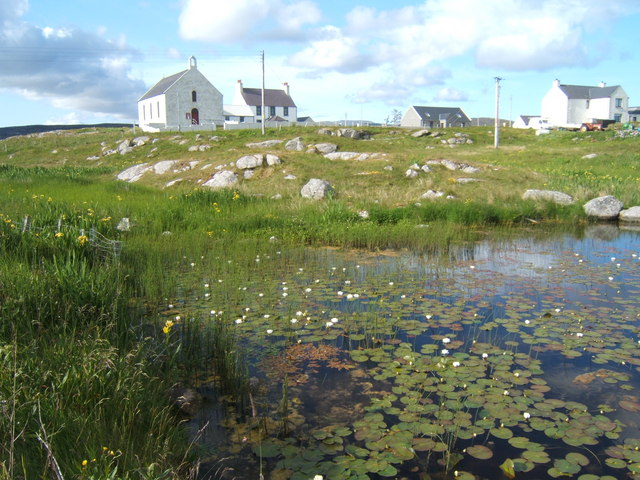
- Waterlilies on Loch nan Clacha-mora in front of Dalabrog Church

- Location within the Outer Hebrides
- Language: Scottish Gaelic; English
- OS grid reference: NF753213
- Civil parish: South Uist
- Council area: Na h-Eileanan Siar
- Lieutenancy area: Western Isles
- Country: Scotland
- Sovereign state: United Kingdom
- Post town: ISLE OF SOUTH UIST
- Postcode district: HS8
- Dialling code: 01878
- Police: Scotland
- Fire: Scottish
- Ambulance: Scottish
- UK Parliament: Na h-Eileanan an Iar
- Scottish Parliament: Na h-Eileanan an Iar

Daliburgh (Scottish Gaelic: Dalabrog) is a crofting township on South Uist, in the Outer Hebrides, Scotland. Daliburgh is situated 1 1/2 miles (2.5 kilometres) west from Lochboisdale, has the second largest population of any township in South Uist, and is also in the parish of South Uist. Daliburgh is situated at the junction of the A865 and the B888. Like Lochboisdale, Daliburgh has undergone major changes in recent years.

Ranald Macdonald, younger brother of Donald Macdonald 4th of Kinlochmoidart, was granted the tack of Daliburgh from the chief of Clanranald in 1730.

== Community ==
The South End Community Hall on the northern edge of Daliburgh includes a fitness suite and indoor sports facilities.

Adjacent to the Borrodale Hotel a memorial commemorates the life and verse of Donald Allan MacDonald, a Gaelic poet who lived at Daliburgh during the mid 20th century.

=== School ===
Daliburgh School lost its first-year secondary class in 2009, and now offers primary schooling for ages 5 to 12, with an independent cròileagan (nursery/after-school club) next door

Daliburgh is well known for its annual summer music school, Ceòlas, which runs for one week every July in the local school and includes classes for both adults and children. Ceòlas also runs youth music classes throughout the year, and has a small office adjacent to the school itself.

=== Churches ===
The Church of Scotland has a large traditional 19th century church building, with attached hall and manse, at the junction by the Borrodale Hotel. Along the road to the west - strictly in the township of Cille Pheadair is the Roman Catholic Church of Saint Peter, with a public hall opposite used for a wide variety of functions, including public ceilidhs and dances, sales, private parties and so on.

== Economy ==
Businesses located within the township include the Post Office, the Co-op supermarket, Borrodale Hotel (public internet access available), Scottish Hydro Electric shop, Burnside Fish and Chips and filling station, and the thrift shop (charity shop), which sells tea, coffee and food.

The Uist Travel Lodge and Bunkhouse opened in 2010, incorporating a cafe and gift shop in Uist House. The building was constructed in the 1970s, and was previously a care home.

A commercial office development, financed by Western Isles Enterprise, remained unoccupied for nearly ten years. Finally, in 2010, it was announced that the development would become the offices for Stòras Uibhist, the community-owned landlord of South Uist, Eriskay and much of Benbecula. The business had relocated from the old manse in Bornish.

=== Services ===
Sacred Heart hospital in Daliburgh was built in 1894 with money donated by philanthropist John Crichton-Stuart, 3rd Marquess of Bute, at the request of two South Uist Roman Catholic priests; poet Allan MacDonald, alias (Scottish Gaelic: "Maighstir Ailein"), of St Peter's Church in Daliburgh and John Mackintosh, alias "The Big Priest of the Horses" (Scottish Gaelic: Sagart Mòr nan Each), of St. Mary's Church in Bornish.

The hospital was closed in 2000 and replaced by the newly built Uist and Barra Hospital in Benbecula. The old hospital has been converted into a care home for the elderly, now known as Taigh a' Chridhe Uile Naomh, retaining the original hospital as a part of the new. The building is a significant user of renewable energy, with ground source heat pumps and three 6 kW (8 hp) wind turbines.

Near to Taigh a' Chridhe Uile Naomh is the South Uist Medical Centre, offering doctors consultations, practice nurses and pharmacy.

Also in Daliburgh there is a fire and rescue service station, which is staffed by volunteers, and a small territorial army centre.

== Gallery ==
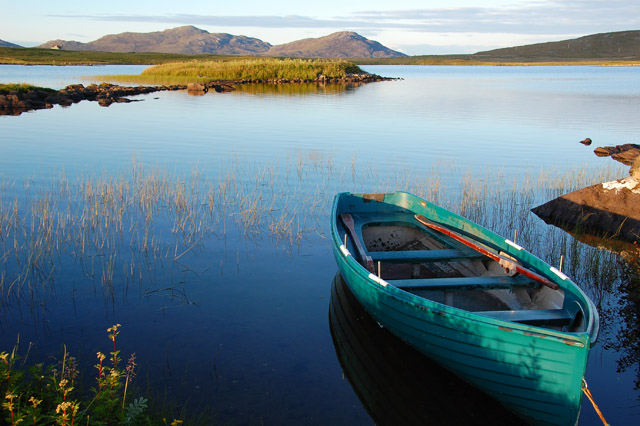
Eilean Chreamh in Loch Dun na Cillie

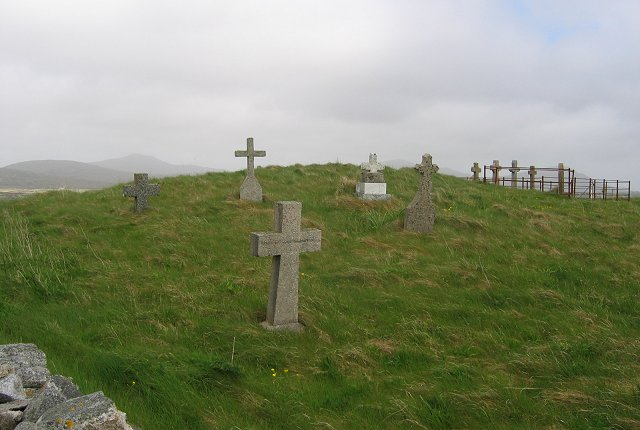
Thallan graveyard

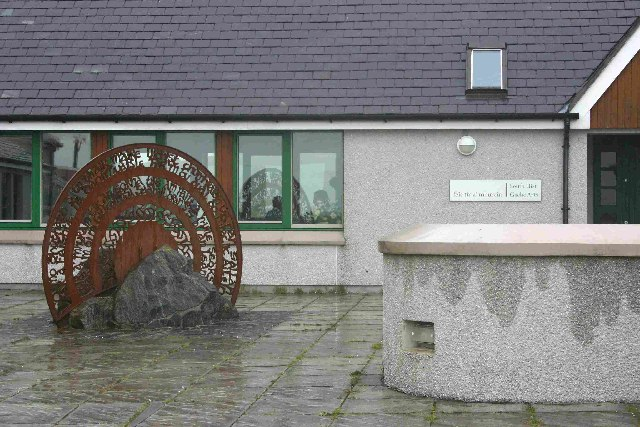
South Uist Gaelic Arts
