= William Forster (bishop) =

Anglican Bishop of Sodor and Man from 1633 to 1635

The Right Reverend William Forster, DD
- Bishop of Sodor and Man
- Diocese: Diocese of Sodor and Man
- In office: 1633–1635
- Predecessor: John Philips
- Successor: Richard Parr

Personal details
- Died: 1635
- Buried: St Bartholomew's Church, Barrow
- Denomination: Anglican
- Education: St Catharine's College, Cambridge

Styles of William Forster, D.D.
- Reference style: The Right Reverend
- Spoken style: My Lord
- Religious style: Bishop

William Forster, D.D. (died 1635) was an Anglican clergyman who served in the Church of England as the Bishop of Sodor and Man from 1633 to 1635.

He was educated at St Catharine's College, Cambridge, and later becoming a Fellow of the college. He was appointed a canon of Chester in 1618.

He was nominated bishop of Sodor and Man by William Stanley, 6th Earl of Derby on 26 December 1633 and consecrated on 9 March 1634.

He died in office on 23 or 24 February 1635 and was buried at St Bartholomew's Church, Barrow on 26 February 1635, where he had also been rector.

Church of England titles
Preceded by John Philips	Bishop of Sodor and Man; 1633–1635	Succeeded by Richard Parr
