= Conrad (bishop of Sodor and Man) =

Conrad O.Cist. was a pre-Reformation cleric who was appointed the Bishop of Sodor and Man in the early 15th century.

A Cistercian monk, he was appointed the Bishop of Sodor and Man by Pope Boniface IX on 9 January 1402. Conrad can have only served for a few months, because his successor Theodore Bloc was appointed on 16 April 1402.

== See also ==
- Conrad (Bishop of Utrecht)
- Conrad II, Bishop of Hildesheim

Catholic Church titles
Preceded by John Sproten	Bishop of Sodor and Man; 1402	Succeeded by Theodore Bloc
