= Thomas Kirkham =

Thomas Kirkham O.Cist
- Bishop of Sodor and Man
- Appointed: 21 June 1458
- In office: 1458 – before 1478
- Predecessor: Thomas Burton
- Successor: Richard Oldham (bishop)

Personal details
- Died: 1480
- Buried: Vale Royal Abbey
- Denomination: Roman Catholic

Styles of Thomas Kirkham, O.Cist.
- Reference style: The Right Reverend
- Spoken style: My Lord
- Religious style: Bishop

Thomas Kirkham (died 1480) was a pre-Reformation ecclesiastic notable for his role as the Bishop of Sodor and Man during the latter half of the 15th century.

Originating from the Cistercians, Kirkham ascended to the position of Abbot at Vale Royal in Cheshire, assuming office around the years 1438 or 1439. His ecclesiastical career progressed with his appointment to the episcopate of the Diocese of Sodor and Man by Pope Callixtus III on the 21st of June, 1458.

After two decades, it's presumed he tendered his resignation from the episcopal throne, as evidenced by the consecration of Richard Oldham as his episcopal successor in the year 1478.

Kirkham's died in 1480, and he was buried within the confines of Vale Royal Abbey.

Catholic Church titles
Preceded by Thomas Burton	Bishop of Sodor and Man; 1458–1478	Succeeded by Richard Oldham
