= George Mason (bishop) =

Anglican bishop of Sodor and Man, 1780–1783

The Right Reverend George Mason
- Bishop of Sodor and Man
- Diocese: Diocese of Sodor and Man
- In office: 1780–1783 (death)
- Predecessor: Richard Richmond
- Successor: Claudius Crigan

Personal details
- Born: 1729
- Died: 8 December 1783 (aged 53–54)
- Denomination: Anglican

George Mason (1729 – 8 December 1783) was an Anglican bishop who served in the Church of England as the Bishop of Sodor and Man from 1780 to 1783.

== Life ==
He was born in Kirkby Stephen and educated nearby at Sedbergh School. Mason was nominated Bishop of Sodor and Man by Charlotte Murray, Duchess of Atholl on 19 March 1780 and consecrated on 5 March 1780.

He died in office on 8 December 1783.

Church of England titles
Preceded by Richard Richmond	Bishop of Sodor and Man; 1780–1783	Succeeded by Claudius Crigan
