= Huan Blackleach =

Huan Blackleach O.S.A
- Bishop of Sodor and Man
- Appointed: 4 April 1487
- In office: 1487–1509
- Predecessor: Richard Oldham (bishop)
- Successor: Huan Hesketh

Personal details
- Died: 1509
- Denomination: Roman Catholic

Styles of Huan Blackleach, O.S.A.
- Reference style: The Right Reverend
- Spoken style: My Lord
- Religious style: Bishop

Huan Blackleach (or Hugh Blackleach), O.S.A. (died 1509) was a pre-Reformation cleric who served as the Bishop of Sodor and Man from 1487 to 1509.

An Austin friar from Asheridge, Buckinghamshire, he was appointed the bishop of the diocese of Sodor and Man by Pope Innocent VIII on 4 April 1487. After serving the see for twenty-two years, he died in office in 1509.

Catholic Church titles
Preceded by Richard Oldham	Bishop of Sodor and Man; 1487–1509	Succeeded by Huan Hesketh
