= NHS Western Isles =

Health board serving the Outer Hebrides, Scotland

- NHS nan Eilean Siar (Scottish Gaelic)

- Type: NHS board
- Established: 1 April 2004
- Headquarters: 37 South Beach; Stornoway; HS1 2BB
- Region served: Outer Hebrides
- Hospitals: St Brendan's Hospital; Uist and Barra Hospital; Western Isles Hospital
- Staff: 821 (2017/18)
- Website: www.wihb.scot.nhs.uk

NHS Western Isles (Scottish Gaelic: NHS nan Eilean Siar) is an NHS board serving the Outer Hebrides (Western Isles) of Scotland. It is one of the fourteen regions of NHS Scotland. NHS Western Isles is responsible for providing primary and secondary healthcare to the 26,000 people in the Outer Hebrides. It employs over 1,000 staff (excluding GPs and dentists).

NHS Western Isles NHS has three hospitals. The largest is the Western Isles Hospital, a rural general hospital located in Stornoway. It was opened in 1992 with a range of hospital acute specialities, psychiatry and care of the elderly. Some consultant led services are provided in the Western Isles hospital by consultants based in mainland hospitals. The hospital also includes diagnostic facilities, day hospital, laboratory and Allied Health Professionals and other services.

The Uist and Barra Hospital is located in Benbecula, and was opened in 2001. It provides a local service for the population of the Southern Isles. The hospital has 29 beds, and provides care of the elderly, GP Acute and Midwifery led maternity services. Many of the Consultants from the Western Isles Hospital, and some from mainland Boards, visit the Uist & Barra Hospital to provide outpatient services.

St. Brendan's Hospital, with five beds, is located in Castlebay on the Isle of Barra and is in a shared building with a Local Authority Residential facility. It is supported by the local GP Practice to provide care of the elderly and other services.

General practitioners from nine different GP practices provide services at fourteen sites across the Western Isles.

The Western Isles Dental Centre is located in Stornoway, adjacent to the Western Isles Hospital; the dental centre opened In December 2010.

The board has a Baby friendly initiative award, presented to staff in both hospital and community divisions in June 2015.

In 2011, the health board spent over £2.1 million in a year on flights alone for patient travel, equivalent to £80 per individual served out of the 26000 strong population.

== See also ==
- List of hospitals in Scotland (NHS Western Isles section)
