= Claudius Crigan =

Anglican bishop of Sodor and Man 1784 to 1813

- Bishop of Sodor and Man
- Installed: 1784
- Term ended: 1813 (death)
- Predecessor: George Mason
- Successor: George Murray

Personal details
- Born: Claudius Crigan c. 1743 Omagh, Tyrone
- Died: 1813 (aged 69–70)
- Denomination: Church of England
- Spouse: Mary Crump (Harman); Mary Crigan née Smelt
- Education: St Mary Hall, Oxford

Claudius Crigan (c. 1743 – 5 April 1813) was an Anglican clergyman who served in the Church of England as the Bishop of Sodor and Man from 1784 to 1813.

A native of Omagh, County Tyrone, Ireland, he was educated at Trinity College, Dublin. He became the chaplain to an infantry regiment stationed in the West Indies, and whilst there, he married Mary, widow of John Harmon of Antigua. After retiring from the army, he became the Rector (or Chaplain) of St Anne's Church in Liverpool.

He was nominated Bishop of Sodor and Man by Charlotte Murray, Duchess of Atholl on 1 March 1784 and received royal assent on 27 March 1784. He was consecrated on 4 April 1784 and enthroned on 5 May 1784.

He died in office on 5 April 1813, aged 74. He had become a Doctor of Divinity (DD).

Church of England titles
Preceded by George Mason	Bishop of Sodor and Man; 1784–1813	Succeeded by George Murray
