= Rowley Hill (bishop) =

Anglican bishop of Sodor and Man (1836–1887)

The Right Reverend Rowley Hill
- Bishop of Sodor and Man
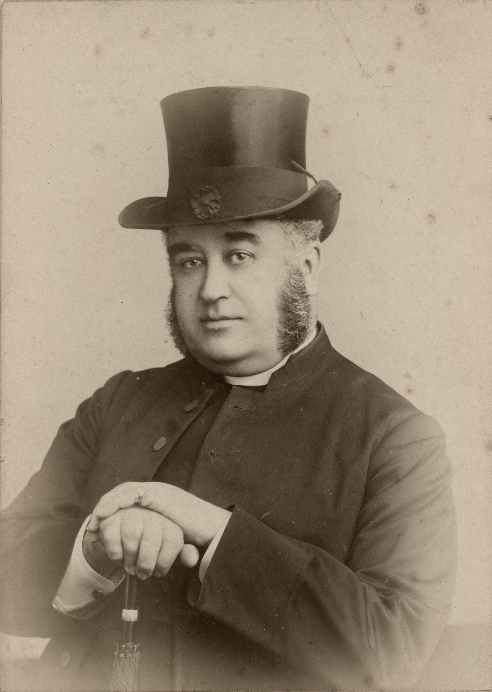
- Diocese: Diocese of Sodor and Man
- In office: 1877–1887 (death)
- Predecessor: Horatio Powys
- Successor: John Bardsley

Personal details
- Born: 22 February 1836 Derry, Ireland
- Died: 27 May 1887 (aged 51) London
- Buried: Brompton Cemetery, London
- Denomination: Anglican
- Spouse: Caroline Maud Chapman (1839-1882); Alice Probyn (1884-1887)

Rowley Hill (22 February 1836 – 27 May 1887) was an Anglican clergyman who served in the Church of England as the Bishop of Sodor and Man from 1877 to 1887.

== Background ==
Born in Derry in Ulster, Ireland, on 22 February 1836, he was the son of Sir George Hill, 3rd Baronet, and Elizabeth Sophia Rea.

== Ordination and early curacies ==
He was ordained a priest in the Anglican ministry in 1860 and served a number of positions in the south of England before becoming Vicar of Sheffield in 1873.

== Bishop of Sodor and Man ==
He was nominated Bishop of Sodor and Man by Queen Victoria on 9 August 1877 and consecrated on 24 August 1877. At his appointment he was the youngest bishop in Anglican communion. At the time of his appointment there was a proposal to add the Archdeaconry of Liverpool to the Diocese of Sodor and Man, but this met with considerable resistance both on the Isle of Man and in Liverpool, resulting in the formation of the Diocese of Liverpool in 1880. Hill resided on the island for most of the year and devoted considerable efforts to placing the Manx Convocation on a more professional footing, and revitalizing church life on the island, where he became extremely popular. He married twice, firstly in 1863 to Caroline Maud Chapman (1839-1882) and secondly in 1884 to Alice Probyn (died 1930).

He is mentioned in the song "If you Want a Receipt for that Popular Mystery" sung by Colonel Calverley in the operetta Patience (1881) by Gilbert and Sullivan. The song lists the elements of a Heavy Dragoon, including "Style of the Bishop of Sodor and Man".

== Death ==
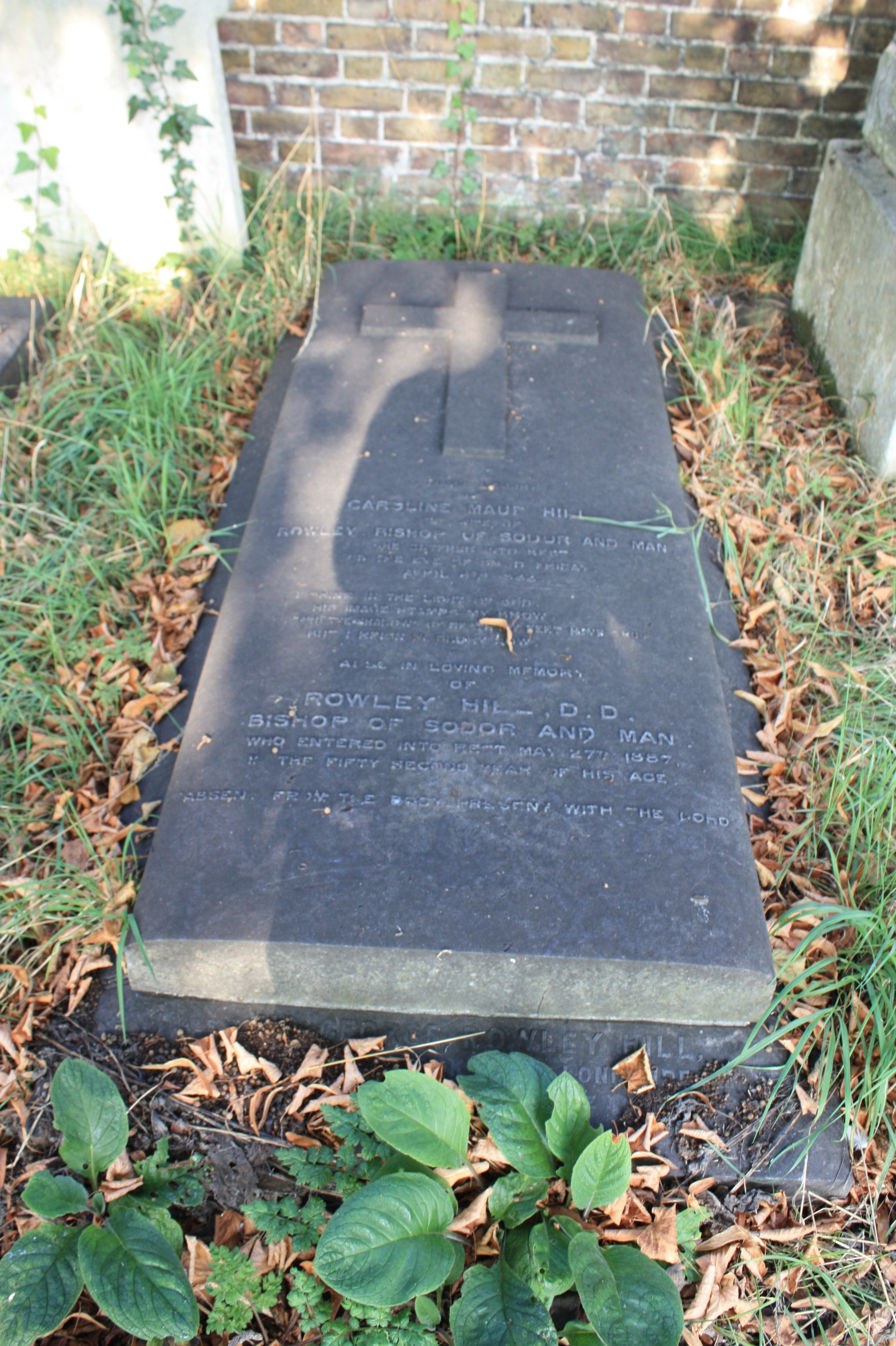
The grave of Bishop Rowley Hill, Brompton Cemetery, London

After nearly ten years of service to the Manx diocese, he died in London on 27 May 1887, aged 51. He is buried against the east wall of Brompton Cemetery in London, south of the main east–west path.

Church of England titles
Preceded by Horatio Powys	Bishop of Sodor and Man; 1877–1887	Succeeded by John Bardsley
