= Stephen Robbins =

British Church of England priest and former British Army officer

Stephen Robbins CB QHC (born 1953) is a British Church of England priest and former British Army officer. He is bishop's chaplain to Nick Holtam, Bishop of Salisbury. He was previously the most senior military chaplain in the British Army, serving as Chaplain-General from 2008 to 2011.

== Honours and decorations ==
Robbins was awarded the Queen's Commendation for Valuable Service 'in recognition of gallant and distinguished services in Northern Ireland during the period 1 October 1998 to 31 March 1999'. In the 2011 New Years Honours, Robbins was appointed Companion of the Order of the Bath (CB), military division.

Church of England titles
Preceded by John Blackburn	Archdeacon for the Army; 2004 to 2011	Succeeded by Peter Eagles
