= Andy Herrick =

Andrew Frederick Herrick (born 1958) is a retired Anglican priest who served as Archdeacon of Anglesey.

Herrick was born in Lincolnshire and educated at the University of Wales and Wycliffe Hall Oxford. He was ordained deacon in 1982, and priest in 1983. After a curacy in Aberystwyth he was Priest in charge at Llangeitho. He held incumbencies at Aberporth, Ammanford, Aberystwyth, Lampeter and Holyhead . He was collated archdeacon on 6 May 2018 and retired effective 24 July 2022.
