= St. Brendan's College =

St. Brendan's College may refer to:

- St. Brendan's College, Killarney in County Kerry, Ireland
- St. Brendan's College, Yeppoon in Queensland, Australia
- St. Brendan's Sixth Form College in Bristol, England
- St Brendan-Shaw College in Devonport, Tasmania, Australia
- Woodbrook College, Dún Laoghaire–Rathdown, Ireland, known as "Saint Brendan's College" until 2016

== See also ==
- St. Brendan's (disambiguation), for similarly named schools
