= William Stanton Jones =

British Anglican bishop

The Right Reverend William Stanton Jones
- Bishop of Sodor and Man
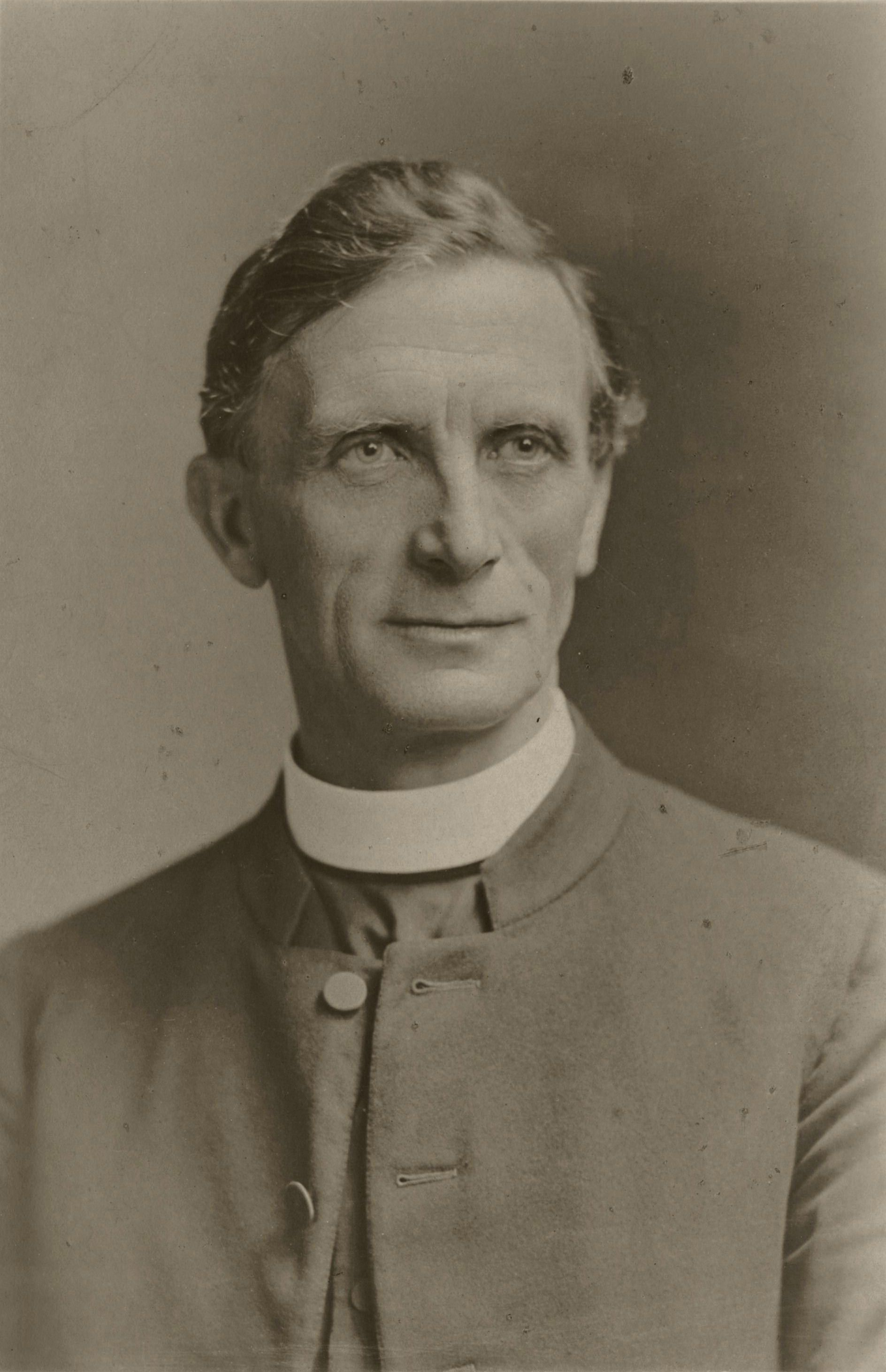
- In office: 1928–1942
- Predecessor: Charles Leonard Thornton-Duesbury
- Successor: John Ralph Strickland Taylor
- Other post: Bishop of Sodor and Man (1887–1891)

Personal details
- Born: 29 July 1866
- Died: 13 August 1951 (aged 85)
- Denomination: Anglican
- Education: Durham University

William Stanton Jones (29 July 1866 – 13 August 1951) was an Anglican bishop.

Stanton Jones was educated at Durham University. Ordained in 1892 he began his ordained ministry as a curate at Widnes, after which he was vicar of St Polycarp's Liverpool. He was then vicar of St Mary's with St Lawrence's Kirkdale, Liverpool and rural dean of Middleton. From 1921 (pictured) to 1928 he was Archdeacon of Bradford when he was ordained to the episcopate as Bishop of Sodor and Man, a position he held for 14 years.

Religious titles
Preceded by Charles Leonard Thornton-Duesbury	Bishop of Sodor and Man; 1928–1942	Succeeded by John Ralph Strickland Taylor
