= John Seyre =

- Bishop of Sodor and Man
- Appointed: 10 October 1435
- In office: 1435 – before 1455
- Predecessor: John Burgherlin
- Successor: Thomas Burton (bishop)

Personal details
- Denomination: Roman Catholic

Styles of John Seyre
- Reference style: The Right Reverend
- Spoken style: My Lord
- Religious style: Bishop

John Seyre (or Feyre) was a pre-Reformation cleric who served as the Bishop of Sodor and Man in the 15th century.

He was appointed bishop of the Diocese of Sodor and Man by papal provision on 10 October 1435 and consecrated on 11 November 1435. It is not known when his episcopate ended, but his successor Thomas Burton was appointed on 25 September 1455.

Catholic Church titles
Preceded by John Burgherlin	Bishop of Sodor and Man; 1435 – ?	Succeeded by Thomas Burton
