= Peter Eagles =

British Anglican bishop

The Right Reverend Peter Eagles QHC
- Bishop of Sodor and Man
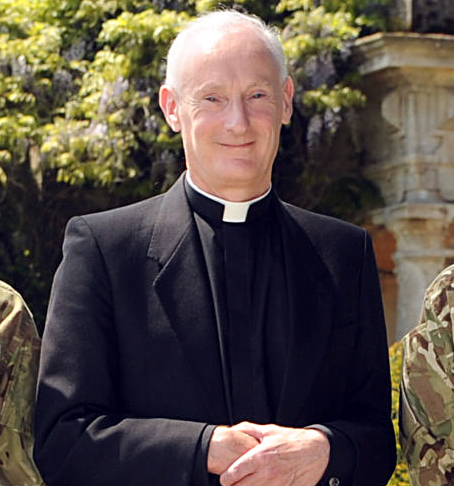
- Eagles in 2013
- Church: Church of England
- Diocese: Diocese of Sodor and Man
- In office: 2017 to 2023
- Predecessor: Robert Paterson
- Successor: TBA
- Other posts: Archdeacon for the Army (2011–2017); Deputy Chaplain-General (2014–2017)

Orders
- Ordination: 1989 (deacon) by Graham Leonard; 1990 (priest) by Tom Butler
- Consecration: 22 June 2017 by John Sentamu

Personal details
- Born: Peter Andrew Eagles; 6 July 1959 (age 67)
- Residence: Thie yn Aspick, Douglas
- Spouse: Gail (m. 1992)
- Children: One
- Education: Royal Grammar School, Guildford
- Alma mater: King's College London; St Stephen's House, Oxford; Royal College of Defence Studies
- Military career
- Allegiance: United Kingdom
- Branch: British Army
- Service years: 1990–2017
- Rank: Deputy Chaplain General (equivalent to brigadier)
- Service number: 539182
- Unit: Royal Army Chaplains' Department

Peter Andrew Eagles, QHC (born 6 July 1959) is a British retired Anglican bishop. From 2017 to 2023, he was the Bishop of Sodor and Man; he was consecrated a bishop in the Church of England in June 2017, and he was installed in September 2017. He is a former chaplain of the British Army, serving as Archdeacon for the Army (2011–2017) and the Deputy Chaplain-General of the Royal Army Chaplains' Department (2014–2017).

== Early life and education ==
Eagles was born on 6 July 1959. He was educated at the Royal Grammar School, an all-boys private school in Guildford, Surrey. He studied German and Russian at King's College, London, and he graduated in 1982 with a first class Bachelor of Arts (BA) degree and the Associateship of King's College (AKC).

Between 1982 and 1986, Eagles was an assistant master at Tonbridge School, an independent school in Tonbridge, Kent, and also worked as a freelance translator. In 1986, he entered St Stephen's House, Oxford, an Anglo-Catholic theological college, to train for holy orders and study theology. He graduated with a further BA in 1988.

== Ordained ministry ==
Eagles was ordained in the Church of England: made a deacon at Petertide 1989 (1 July), by Graham Leonard, Bishop of London, at St Paul's Cathedral and ordained a priest the Petertide following (1 July 1990), by Tom Butler, Bishop of Willesden, at his title church. From 1989 to 1992, he served his curacy at St Martin's Church, Ruislip, an Anglo-Catholic church in the Diocese of London.

=== Military service ===
On 27 January 1990, Eagles was commissioned into the Royal Army Chaplains' Department of the British Army as a Chaplain to the Forces 4th Class (equivalent in rank to captain). He was promoted to Chaplain to the Forces 3rd Class (equivalent in rank to major) on 27 January 1998, and to Chaplain to the Forces 2nd Class on 5 September 2005 (equivalent in rank to lieutenant colonel). From 2007 to 2008, he was Chaplain of the Royal Military Chapel (Guards Chapel) at Wellington Barracks in London.

On 28 January 2008, Eagles was promoted to Chaplain to the Forces 1st Class (equivalent in rank to colonel) and appointed an Assistant Chaplain General. On 28 July 2011, he was collated and licensed as the Archdeacon for the Army, the most senior Anglican chaplain in the British Army, during a service at Lambeth Palace Chapel; as such he was a member of the General Synod of the Church of England. From 2013 to 2014, he attended the Royal College of Defence Studies to prepare for further promotion. On 14 July 2014, he was appointed the Deputy Chaplain General (equivalent in rank to brigadier), thereby becoming the second most senior chaplain in the British Army.

During his military career, Eagles undertook multiple tours of duty. These included postings to Northern Ireland during The Troubles, with the United Nations in Kosovo, to Iraq as senior chaplain to the 12 Mechanised Brigade and to Helmand Province, Afghanistan as senior chaplain to the 16 Air Assault Brigade.

Eagles officially retired from the British Army on 6 July 2017.

=== Episcopal ministry ===
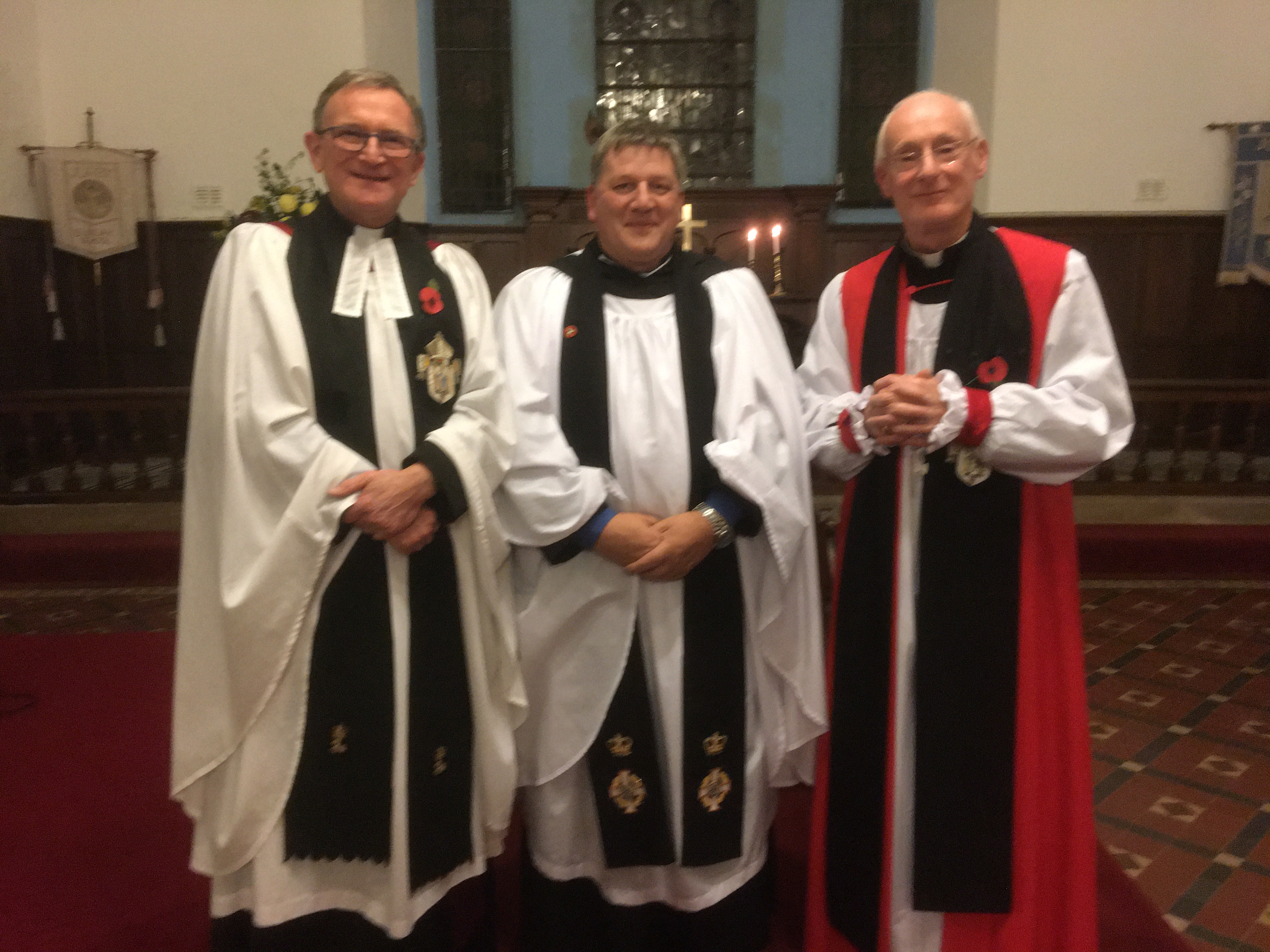
Eagles (right) during the installation of a new vicar in 2019

On 4 May 2017, it was announced that Eagles would be the next Bishop of Sodor and Man. He was consecrated a bishop on 22 June 2017 during a service at York Minster, by John Sentamu, Archbishop of York. He was installed at the Cathedral Church of St German in Peel, Isle of Man on 30 September 2017. As Bishop of Sodor and Man, he has an ex-officio seat on the Legislative Council of the Isle of Man which he took up upon his installation as bishop.

In March 2023, it was announced that Eagles would retire as Bishop of Sodor and Man after six years in the post in October 2023. His farewell service was held on 28 October followed by the laying down of his crozier, symbolically ending his time as bishop. He retirement was effective 31 October 2023.

=== Views ===
Eagles belongs to the Anglo-Catholic wing of the Church of England. Though he has a traditionalist background, due to the circumstances of the Diocese of Sodor and Man (only having one bishop), he plans to "ordain all who are called to be deacons and priests". As such, he has ordained women to the priesthood.

== Personal life ==
In 1992, Eagles married Gail Seager. Together they have one son.

== Honours ==
On 17 October 2013, Eagles was appointed an Honorary Chaplain to the Queen (QHC). On 15 October 2015, he was installed as an honorary canon of Salisbury Cathedral.

Church of England titles
Preceded by Stephen Robbins	Archdeacon for the Army; 2011–2017	Succeeded by Clinton Langston
Preceded by Robert Paterson	Bishop of Sodor and Man; 2017–2023	Succeeded by TBA
