= Robert Paterson (bishop) =

British Anglican bishop (born 1949)

The Right Reverend Robert Paterson
- Bishop of Sodor and Man
- Church: Church of England
- Diocese: Diocese of Sodor and Man
- In office: 2008–2016
- Predecessor: Graeme Knowles
- Successor: Peter Eagles
- Other posts: Dean of Peel (ex officio; 2008–2011); Member of the Legislative Council (ex officio; 2008–2016)

Orders
- Ordination: 1972
- Consecration: 25 April 2008

Personal details
- Born: 27 February 1949 (age 77)
- Denomination: Anglican
- Spouse: Pauline Anne
- Children: Three
- Education: St John's College, Durham

Robert Mar Erskine Paterson (born 27 February 1949) is a British Anglican bishop. He was the Bishop of Sodor and Man in the Church of England from 2008 until his retirement in 2016.

== Early life and education ==
Paterson was born on 27 February 1949 in Cardiff, Wales. He was educated at King Henry VIII School, Coventry, a [a local authority grammar school] He studied at St John's College, Durham, graduating with a Bachelor of Arts (BA) degree in 1971, and was awarded the Van Mildert Scholarship in the same year. He then spent a year training for ordained ministry at Cranmer Hall, Durham (an Anglican theological college that is part of St John's College, Durham), and completed a Diploma in Theology (DipTh) in 1972. He graduated with a Master of Arts (MA) degree from Durham University in 1983.

== Ordained ministry ==
Paterson was ordained in the Church of England as a deacon in 1972. From 1972 to 1973, he was a curate in the Diocese of Manchester at Christ Church, Harpurhey. In 1973, he transferred to the Church in Wales and was ordained as a priest in 1973 by the Bishop of Swansea and Brecon. He undertook a further curacy in Sketty, Swansea from 1973 to 1978, during which he was seconded to a parish in Fort Lauderdale, Florida. From 1978 to 1983 he was Rector of two parishes and Diocesan World Mission Officer. From 1983 to 1994 he was Vicar of St Mark's Cardiff, during which he was a member of the Church in Wales Forward Planning Group. In 1994 he became Team Rector of Cowbridge, Vale of Glamorgan, during which he was a Trustee of the South Glamorgan Buildings Preservation Trust and an examining chaplain for the Bishop of Llandaff. From 2000 to 2006 he was Principal Officer of the Church in Wales Council for Mission and Ministry. He was a member of the Governing Body of the Church in Wales 1974-83, 1989-1992, and 1995-2006. He has served on a number of national and international bodies, including the Church Mission Society, the Church Pastoral-Aid Society and the United Society for the Propagation of the Gospel. In 1993 he was a consultant on African Culture and Anglican Liturgy in Kenya and Uganda, and gave a series of lectures in Pretoria, South Africa in 2001 on Mission in the New Testament. From 1998 to 2003 he was a Trustee of the Church Education and Development Partnership for Southern Africa (Chair from 1999). In 1992 he co-founded of the Four Nations Liturgical Group (Convener 2000-03). He was a member of the Porvoo Churches' Contact Group and co-chaired two international symposia on the Diaconate. He chaired the Churches Together in Britain and Ireland Ecumenical Architecture Group for Wales, drafted the Church in Wales Ecumenical Canons and was a member of the Anglican - Roman Catholic Liaison Group. From 2002-09 he was Vice Chair of the Anglican Primates' Working Group on Theological Education (Convener of its Steering Group), and was a consultant on theological education at the Anglican Primates' Meetings in 2003 and 2005, and at the Anglican Consultative Council in 2005. In 2004 he was made a metropolitical canon of the Province of Wales. He was appointed chaplain and researcher to John Sentamu, Archbishop of York, in 2006.

=== Episcopal ministry ===
Paterson was nominated as the next Bishop of Sodor and Man in 2008 to replace Graeme Knowles. The appointment was confirmed by Letters Patent issued by Queen Elizabeth II on 18 April 2008. He was consecrated as a bishop on 25 April 2008 at York Minster. He was enthroned Bishop and Dean of Sodor and Man on 14 June 2008 at St German's Cathedral in Peel, Isle of Man. He chaired the Central Readers' Council for England and Wales, was Vice Chair of the Liturgical Commission and the Fresh Expressions Board, convened the House of Bishops' Working Group on Civil Partnerships (2011–12), co-chaired the Church of England Lay Ministries Working Group (2015–16) and was the Archbishop of Canterbury's envoy to the Church of Ceylon (2014–15). He chaired reviews of training for ministry in Wales (2013–14) and Ireland (2015–16).

He retired from full-time ministry on 11 November 2016. In retirement, he is an honorary assistant bishop in the Diocese of Worcester and the Diocese of Hereford. In retirement he has become involved with clergy review and has been appointed Dean for Evangelism in the Worcester Diocese; he is a mentor in the Germinate Leadership programme.

== Other works ==
He is author of a number of books on liturgy and preaching and his interests include current affairs, early music, literature, walking, cycling and the countryside. As the island's bishop, he sat ex officio on the Legislative Council and Tynwald Court and was required to vote on all matters. Throughout his period of office Paterson spoke in Tynwald particularly on ethical issues concerning international aid, a register of beneficial ownership, family and end-of-life issues and the rights of minorities.

== Personal life ==
Paterson is married to Pauline Anne. Together they have one son, two daughters and two grandsons.

== Selected works ==
- Paterson, Robert (1987). Short, sharp and off the point: the art of good (and bad) preaching. Eastbourne: MARC Europe. ISBN 978-0947697501.
- Paterson, Robert M. E., ed. (1997). The Monarch book of Christian wisdom. Crowborough: Monarch. ISBN 978-1854243607.
- Paterson, Robert (2018). Making Christ Visible.

== Styles ==
- The Reverend Robert Paterson (1972–2004)
- The Reverend Canon Robert Paterson (2004–2008)
- The Right Reverend Robert Paterson (2008–present)

Church of England titles
Preceded by Graeme Knowles	Bishop of Sodor and Man; 2008–2016	Succeeded by Peter Eagles
