= Huan Hesketh =

- Bishop of Sodor and Man
- Appointed: 15 April or 18 May 1513
- In office: 1513 – before 1523
- Predecessor: Huan Blackleach
- Successor: John Howden (bishop)

Personal details
- Denomination: Roman Catholic

Styles of Huan Hesketh
- Reference style: The Right Reverend
- Spoken style: My Lord
- Religious style: Bishop

Huan Hesketh (or Hugh Hesketh) was a pre-Reformation clergyman who served as the Bishop of Sodor and Man in the early 16th century.

He was appointed the bishop of the Diocese of Sodor and Man by papal provision on 15 April or 18 May 1513. It is not known when his episcopate ended, but his successor John Howden was appointed in May or June 1523.

Catholic Church titles
| Preceded by Huan Blackleach | Bishop of Sodor and Man; 1513 – ? | Succeeded by John Howden |
