= Charles Thornton-Duesbury =

Manx Anglican bishop (1867–1928)

The Right Reverend Charles Leonard Thornton-Duesbury
- Bishop of Sodor and Man
- In office: 1925–1928 (death)
- Predecessor: Denton Thompson
- Successor: William Stanton Jones

Personal details
- Born: 3 February 1867 Isle of Man
- Died: 11 March 1928 (aged 61)
- Denomination: Anglican
- Education: Trinity College, Dublin

Charles Leonard Thornton-Duesbury (3 February 1867 – 11 March 1928) was an Anglican bishop who served as the Bishop of Sodor and Man from 1925 until his death in 1928.

Thornton-Duesbury was a native of the Isle of Man and educated at Trinity College, Dublin. Ordained in 1891, his first post was as a curate at St George's-in-the-East, London. He then held incumbencies at St Mark's Barrow-in-Furness, St Peter's Islington and St Mary's Leyton and finally (before his ordination to the episcopate) Holy Trinity, Marylebone.

Church of England titles
Preceded by Denton Thompson	Bishop of Sodor and Man; 1925 – 1928	Succeeded by William Stanton Jones
