= Richard Payl =

15th-century bishop

Richard Payl O.Praed
- Bishop of Sodor and Man
- Appointed: 30 December 1407
- In office: 1410 to c.1429/33
- Predecessor: Theodore Bloc
- Successor: John Burgherlin

Personal details
- Denomination: Roman Catholic

Styles of Richard Payl, O.P.
- Reference style: The Right Reverend
- Spoken style: My Lord
- Religious style: Bishop

Richard Payl (Pawlie, Payli, Paylus or Pulley) was a 15th-century Dominican friar. He served firstly as the Bishop of Dromore before becoming the Bishop of Mann and The Isles.

He was appointed the bishop of the Diocese of Dromore by Pope Gregory XII on 30 December 1407 and was consecrated sometime before 11 November 1408. According to some publications, he was recorded as Richard Messing and which said he died in 1409. It may be there is some confusion with Richard Misyn, O.Carm., probably a later bishop of Dromore.

Payl was translated to the bishoprics of Mann and The Isles by Antipope John XXIII on 30 May 1410. He was recognised as bishop of the Isles until c. 1421 and was still recognised bishop on the Isle of Man until c. 1429–1433.

== Bibliography ==
- Cotton, Henry (1849). The Province of Ulster. Fasti Ecclesiae Hiberniae: The Succession of the Prelates and Members of the Cathedral Bodies of Ireland. Vol. 3. Dublin: Hodges and Smith.
- Dowden, John (1912). Thomson, J. Maitland (ed.). The Bishops of Scotland. Glasgow: James Maclehose and Son.
- Fryde, E. B.; Greenway, D. E.; Porter, S.; Roy, I., eds. (1986). Handbook of British Chronology (3rd, reprinted 2003 ed.). Cambridge: Cambridge University Press. ISBN 0-521-56350-X.
- Reeves, William (1847). Ecclesiastical Antiquities of Down, Connor and Dromore, consisting of a Taxation of those Dioceses. Dublin: Hodges and Smith.

Catholic Church titles
Preceded by Roger Appleby	Bishop of Dromore; 1407 – 1410	Succeeded by John Chourles
Preceded by Michael	Bishop of the Isles; 1410 – c.1421	Succeeded by Michael Ochiltree
Preceded by Theodore Bloc	Bishop of Mann; 1410 – c.1429/33	Succeeded by John Burgherlin
