= Western Isles Hospital =

- NHS Western Isles
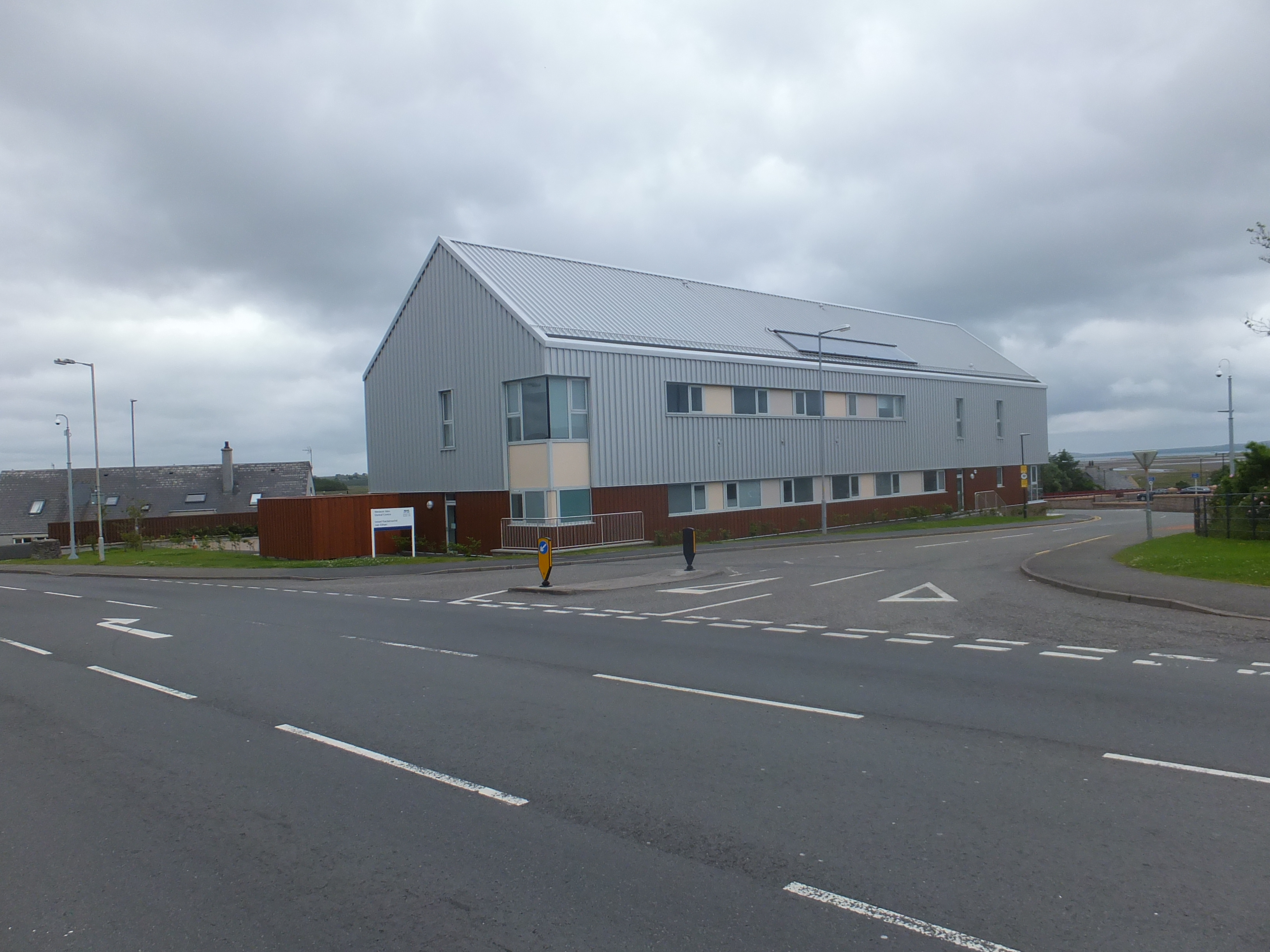
- New building at the Western Isles Hospital

- Shown in the Outer Hebrides

Geography
- Location: Stornoway, Eileanan Siar, Scotland
- Coordinates: 58°13′16″N 6°23′0″W

Organisation
- Care system: NHS Scotland
- Type: General (Rural)

Services
- Beds: 116

Links
- Website: www.wihb.scot.nhs.uk/western-isles-hospital-stornoway
- Other links: List of hospitals in Scotland

The Western Isles Hospital (Scottish Gaelic: Ospadal nan Eilean Siar) is a rural general hospital in Stornoway on Lewis in the Western Isles of Scotland. It is managed by NHS Western Isles.

== History ==
The hospital was built at a cost of £32 million and was officially opened by Prince Charles, Duke of Rothesay in March 1993. A six-bedded stroke rehabilitation unit opened in 2007. In late 2014 the health board announced a Dual-energy X-ray absorptiometry (DEXA) scanner service would be based at the hospital.

== Services ==
The hospital has 116 beds across a range of specialities, including general medicine, geriatrics, paediatrics, general surgery, orthopaedics, obstetrics and gynaecology and psychiatry. Within the hospital there is a learning centre and purpose-built facilities for clinical skills training.
