= Theodore Bloc =

Theodore Bloc O.Crucif
- Bishop of Sodor and Man
- In office: 1402 – before 1410
- Predecessor: Conrad
- Successor: Richard Payl

Personal details
- Denomination: Roman Catholic

Styles of Theodore Bloc, O.Crucif.
- Reference style: The Right Reverend
- Spoken style: My Lord
- Religious style: Bishop

Theodore Bloc, O. Crucif. was a pre-Reformation cleric who was appointed the Bishop of Sodor and Man in the early 15th-century.

A monk of the order of the Crucifers, and of the diocese of Utrecht, he was appointed the bishop of the diocese of Sodor and Man by Pope Boniface IX on 16 April 1402. It is not known when his episcopate ended, but his successor Richard Payl was appointed on 30 May 1410.

Catholic Church titles
Preceded by Conrad	Bishop of Sodor and Man; 1402 – ?	Succeeded by Richard Payl
