= Richard Parr =

Anglican bishop of Sodor and Man 1635-1644

The Right Reverend Richard Parr
- Bishop of Sodor and Man
- Diocese: Diocese of Sodor and Man
- In office: 1635–1644 (death)
- Predecessor: William Forster
- Successor: Samuel Rutter

Personal details
- Born: c. 1592 Lancashire
- Died: 23 March 1644 (aged 51–52) Peel, Isle of Man
- Buried: St Germans Cathedral, Peel
- Denomination: Anglican
- Spouse: Elizabeth Raymond (1624-1644)
- Education: Brasenose College, Oxford

Richard Parr (1592?–23 March 1644) was an English bishop of Sodor and Man.

== Life ==
He was born about 1592 in Lancashire. On 2 September 1609 he entered Brasenose College, Oxford, then aged 17. He commenced B.A. 17 June 1613, was elected Fellow in 1614, and proceeded M.A. 19 April 1616, B.D. 10 June 1624, D.D. 1 July 1634.

In 1616 he took orders, and was a frequent preacher, as well as a tutor. On 25 August 1626 he was instituted rector of Ladbroke, Warwickshire. In 1629 he resigned that living, and was instituted (6 February) to the rectory of Eccleston. On 10 June 1635 he was consecrated bishop of Sodor and Man, retaining Eccleston in commendam. He wintered in England.

In 1641 Parr rebuilt St. Catherine's, Ramsey. His chaplain and curate at Eccleston was Edward Gee. In October 1643 the living was sequestered and given to Gee. Parr remained in his diocese, where he was not disturbed, as the Isle of Man was held by the royalists till 1651.

He died at Bishop's Court, Peel, on 23 March 1644, and was buried on 26 March in the grave of Bishop John Phillips in St Germans Cathedral, Peel. The see was not filled until 1661, by the appointment of Samuel Rutter (died 30 May 1663). The bishop spelled his name originally Parre, and later Parr. He published some sermons.

== Family ==
Parr married in 1624 Elizabeth Raymond, daughter of Thomas Raymond of Guildford. His son, Robert Parr, was rector of Ballaugh (1640–70).
