= Denton Thompson =

British bishop (1856–1924)

The Right Reverend James Denton Thompson
- Bishop of Sodor and Man
- In office: 1912–1924 (death)
- Predecessor: Thomas Wortley Drury
- Successor: Charles Leonard Thornton-Duesbury

Personal details
- Born: 20 July 1856
- Died: 31 October 1924 (aged 68)
- Denomination: Anglican
- Education: Liverpool Institute; Corpus Christi College, Cambridge

Styles of James Denton Thompson
- Reference style: The Right Reverend
- Spoken style: My Lord
- Religious style: Bishop

James Denton Thompson (20 July 1856 – 31 October 1924) was the Bishop of Sodor and Man from 1912 until his death in 1924.

Thompson was and educated at the Liverpool Institute and Corpus Christi College, Cambridge. He was ordained in 1883 and held curacies at St James, Didsbury and St Saviour's, Liverpool. From 1886 to 1889 he was Clerical Superintendent of the Church of England Scripture Readers’ Society. After this he held incumbencies in Bootle, North Meols and Birmingham before ordination to the episcopate.

While serving in Birmingham, Thompson's preaching was praised in a contemporary account, which described him as a "vigorous speaker and preacher" with a "carrying voice" and "spiritual influence".

Although regarded by the Archbishop of Canterbury as lacking in ‘refinement’, Prime Minister Asquith decided to recommend him for the see of Sodor and Man in November 1911. There, the great open-air services attended by visitors played to his strengths. However, tourism came to a temporary halt with the declaration of war in August 1914. Thompson was a strong advocate of British participation in the Great War, even though he realised some of the horrors that lay ahead ‘Horrible beyond all exaggeration are the agonies of mind and body produced by any war, but no imagination can conceive a thousandth part of the horrors of this great and terrible conflict .... If we had preferred peace to honour, or safety to truth, or ease to chivalry, the moral characteristic of the British Empire would have been strained and tarnished for ever.’ Thompson's support for the War never wavered despite the enormous casualties and he opposed those seeking a negotiated peace. ‘But there can be no peace without victory. Not until the power of German militarism is defeated and broken for ever can the world hope for peace. This menace to the freedom and progress of the race must be crushed out of existence before the War can come to an end.’

Thompson died suddenly in Harrogate in October 1924.

== Works ==
- Central Churchmanship or the Position, Principles, and Policy of Evangelical Churchmen in Relation to Modern Thought and Work. 2nd edition: London: Longman, Greens & Co. 1913. Available at the Internet Archive.
- Revived Churchmanship or the Recovery of Pentecost. London: Longman, Greens & Co. 1916. Available at the Internet Archive.

Religious titles
Preceded by Thomas Wortley Drury	Bishop of Sodor and Man; 1912–1924	Succeeded by Charles Leonard Thornton-Duesbury
