= Anian (bishop of Bangor) =

14th-century Catholic bishop

Anian (died before 12 January 1307) was a Catholic priest, and Bishop of Bangor.

He was the first Archdeacon of Anglesey before having been elected bishop before 12 December 1267, consecrated at Canterbury, and received possession of the temporalities 5 January 1268. By the time that Anian was elected bishop, Llywelyn ap Gruffudd, the Prince of Wales, entered into agreements regarding territorial disputes over the rights of the sees of St Asaph and Bangor and relied on the bishops as peacekeeping intermediaries with King Edward I of England, but soon asserted control over the church's property and land.

Anian negotiated agreements with Llywelyn and his brothers, first in 1269 with David at Berriw and then in April 1272 with Rhodri. Anian and the Bishop of St Asaph notified Llywelyn that they disagreed with his treatment of his brother, David, in 1274. The pope, having been contacted by the bishops, issued a condemnation of Llywelyn. Anian created a list of complaints in 1276 against the prince, who was also in dispute with King Edward I.

Having sided with the king, he lived at the St. Albans Abbey in England for ten years beginning in 1277, during a period of unrest in Wales. On St. Mark's Day in 1284, he christened the first English Prince of Wales, Edward II at St. Mary's Chapel. He traveled with Edward I after Llywelyn's death back to his diocese. He received a share of the tithes of royal dues in Englefield and legal rights in the lands of the bishopric for having helped with the settlement of North Wales. Gruffydd ap Iorwerth, who succeeded him, was consecrated on 26 March 1307.

== Sources ==
- J. Beverley Smith (15 January 2014). Llywelyn ap Gruffudd: Prince of Wales. University of Wales Press. ISBN 978-1-78316-007-5.
