= Thomas Stanley (bishop) =

The Right Reverend Thomas Stanley
- Bishop of Sodor and Man
- Diocese: Diocese of Sodor and Man
- In office: 1542–1545 and 1556–1568 (death)
- Predecessor: Henry Man
- Successor: John Salisbury

Personal details
- Died: c. 1568
- Denomination: Anglican

Thomas Stanley (died c. 1568) was Bishop of Sodor and Man during the English Reformation-era.

Allegedly the natural son of Sir Edward Stanley, of Hornby Castle, Lancashire, on account of his bastardy, he obtained leave from the Pope to hold his preferments, especially the rectory of Wigan. In 1513 he became rector of Badworth (Wigan), a post he held until 1549 and shortly after he was appointed rector of Barwick, he became prebendary (canon) of Thorngate from 1528 to 1530.

He was elevated to the see of Sodor and Man in 1542. His diocese was transferred from the province of Canterbury to that of York, and his opposition to this move led to his being deposed in 1545. After an interval of over a dozen years, he was restored to the see in 1556 then subsequently confirmed in the post by the Catholic Mary I of England and appointed by her Governor of the Isle of Man.

During the time of his suspension from the see he became, in 1552, rector of the valuable living of Winwick in Lancashire on the presentation of his cousin Edward Stanley, 3rd Earl of Derby, and in 1557, Rector of North Meols (Wigan).

Notoriously absent, however, his neglect of his many responsibilities was commented on in a letter written by James Pilkington, Bishop of Durham, to Matthew Parker, Archbishop of Canterbury, in which he says, "The Bishop of Man, Thomas Stanley, liveth here at his ease as merry as Pope Joan." It would seem from this that to his other preferments he had added a canonry at Durham Cathedral. In fact, he was only following the example of number of the beneficed clergy of his time who absented themselves from their livings that they might be more free to enjoy themselves.

He appears to have died in office in 1568 but details of his death, or burial place, are unknown and his successor was not appointed until 1569.

Religious titles
Preceded by John Howden	Bishop of Sodor and Man ? – deprived 1545	Succeeded by Henry Man
Preceded by Henry Man	Bishop of Sodor and Man restored 1555/56 – 1568	Succeeded by John Salisbury
