= John Dongan =

Manx and Irish bishop

- Bishop of Down
- Church: Roman Catholic Church
- See: Diocese of Down
- In office: 1394–1413
- Previous post(s): Bishop of Man and the Isles (1374–1387/1391); Bishop of Derry (1391–1394)

Orders
- Consecration: 25 November 1374 by Simon Langham

Personal details
- Born: unknown Man
- Died: 1413 or after

John Dongan [Donegan, Donnegan, Donkan, Duncan] (died 1413) was a medieval Manx prelate. After holding the position of Archdeacon of Down, he held three successive bishoprics, Man and the Isles (Sodor), then the see of Derry and lastly, Down.

He resigned his last bishopric in 1413, and died afterwards at an unrecorded date. He was the last bishop of the united diocese of Sodor, which split into the "Scottish" and "Irish" (Manx) parts because of the Western Schism.

== Bishop of Man and the Isles ==
According to the Manx Chronicle, he was a native Manxman. Despite this, the earliest major ecclesiastical position he is recorded to have obtained was Irish: in 1368 Pope Urban V appointed him Archdeacon of Down. (Dongan was originally Donnagáin and found in the south-Ulster / north-Leinster area . In the following years Dongan worked as a papal tax-collector and nuncio in Ireland.

This service in Ireland was further rewarded in 1374 when he was appointed Bishop of Man and the Isles (Sodor), receiving consecration from Simon Langham, Cardinal-Bishop of Palestrina on either 25 or 26 November 1374. He did not immediately make it back to the British Isles, because while returning from Avignon he was kidnapped. After being imprisoned at Boulogne-sur-Mer, he was ransomed for 500 marks.

He is not known to have returned to the Isle of Man until 25 January 1377, when he is said to have celebrated his first Mass at St Germanus' Cathedral, Peel. Charter evidence confirming two Manx churches to Whithorn Priory, reveals that on 5 February he held a "general chapter", which may have involved a general investigation of church landholdings in the diocese in his role as papal nuncio and tax-collector for the diocese, two roles he had received in addition to the bishopric of Sodor in 1374.

== Bishop of Man only ==
In 1380, allegations were lodged against Dongan that revenues he had been collecting – in an official capacity as collector in Ireland for Pope Urban – were illegally retained. These allegations did not turn out to be of great consequence, and he sided with English-backed Urban against the Scottish-backed anti-pope Clement VII. The latter deprived him of bishopric on 15 July 1387, appointing Michael, previously Archbishop of Cashel, to replace him.

Although Dongan retained de facto episcopal authority in the Isle of Man, this marked, in the words of one historian, the "final rift between the Hebrides and the Isle of Man within the diocese". The northern, Scottish-controlled portion of his diocese was lost to the new bishop, and in fact Dongan was to be the last bishop to preside over both the Scottish and English-controlled islands that had until then formed the diocese of Sodor.

These developments meant that Dongan's already poor diocese was minuscule, too small really to necessitate a full-time bishop, and so Dongan's episcopal status was put to use elsewhere by busier prelates. In the early 1390s he is found in England acting as a kind of deputy to various English bishops. On 14 January 1390, for instance, he is found working on the commission of the Bishop of Salisbury.

In 1391 and 1392 he was performing ordinations in the diocese of London on behalf of the Bishop of London, though he was no longer at that stage Bishop of Sodor.

== Irish bishoprics ==
By this point the non-Avignon papacy, under Pope Boniface IX (Urban's successor), decided to move Dongan into an Irish see. Ireland was (as a territory of the King of England) in their allegiance and thus candidates they appointed to Irish bishoprics could actually expect to take physical possession. On 11 July 1391 he was provided to the bishopric of Derry in the province of Armagh. He held this position for only three years, as on 16 September 1394 he was translated to the bishopric of Down, also in the province of Armagh.

As the bishop of Down, his most notable role was his diplomatic interactions on behalf of the English crown with the native Gaelic leaders of Ireland and Scotland. In 1405 he was given this role and appointed "keeper of the liberty of Ulster". In September 1407 he and Janico Dartas, "Admiral of Ireland", were authorised to arrange a peace with Domhnall of Islay, Lord of the Isles.

Such negotiations were still taking place in 1408, and though records for the process vanish afterwards, the two marriages recorded in 1410 between Dartas' children and the family of this Scottish magnate suggests a peaceful accord was reached.

Bishop Dongan resigned his see in 1413. This is the last notice of him, so it is unclear when exactly he died, though it is presumed to be soon afterwards.

== Notes ==
Catholic Church titles
Preceded by William Russell	Bishop of Man and the Isles; 1374–1387/1391	Succeeded by John Sproten (Bishop of Man)
Preceded by William Russell	Bishop of Man and the Isles; 1374–1387/1391	Succeeded by Michael (Bishop of the Isles)
Preceded by John	Bishop of Derry; 1391–1394	Succeeded by Seoán Ó Mocháin
Preceded by John Ross	Bishop of Down; 1394–1413	Succeeded by John Sely
