= John Gee (priest) =

English Church of England cleric

John Gee (c.1596–1639) was an English Church of England cleric. A survivor of the Fatal Vespers disaster, at a time when he was involved in clandestine Roman Catholic religious activity, he then became a writer against Catholics.

== Life ==
The son of John Gee (died 1631), parish priest of Dunsford, Devon, and his wife Sarah, he was a nephew of Edward Gee; a brother Sir Orlando Gee (1619–1705) was knighted in 1682. He matriculated at Brasenose College, Oxford, 13 July 1612, aged 16, and migrated to Exeter College, where he graduated B.A. 28 February 1617, and M.A. 17 October 1621.

After taking holy orders, Gee by 1619 was a curate at Newton-le-Willows, near Winwick, places then in Lancashire. In the years to 1623 his activities as a cleric including clandestine marriages, work on behalf of John Bridgeman, the bishop of Chester, contact with the Stanley family of Winwick who were recusants, and undermining Josiah Horne who held the Winwick living at the time of the Spanish Match controversy. Horne brought a Star Chamber case against Gee in 1623, and Bridgeman denied Gee the right to preach.

Meanwhile Gee was also in contact with London Roman Catholics. He attended the "Fatal Vespers" at Blackfriars (26 October 1623), to hear Robert Drury in an upstairs room. When the floor fell in, Gee was one of the limited number of survivors.

Shortly after the disaster, George Abbot, the Archbishop of Canterbury, summoned Gee to an interview. His chaplains Thomas Goad and Daniel Featley obtained from him a commitment to the Church of England, with the backing of Gee's father. He was later beneficed at Tenterden, Kent, where he died in 1639.

== Information & Cultural Affairs ==
Gee published in 1624 The Foot out of the Snare. The book has many contemporary allusions, and is full of stories against Catholic priests, their deceptions and vices, many purporting to be drawn from the author's personal experience. Its publication caused excitement, and it rapidly passed through four editions; Catholics, according to Gee, threatened to cut his throat. Some Protestants deprecated its tone.

George Musket complained that Gee had falsely called him a Jesuit, and Gee replied with sarcasm in the fourth edition. The work was reprinted in the Somers Tracts. An appendix also appeared in 1624 entitled New Shreds of the Old Snare.

Other works by Gee were:

- "Hold Fast" A 1624 sermon at St. Paul's Cross, published with a dedication to Sir Robert Naunton.
- Steps of Ascension to God, or a Ladder of Heaven, London, 1625, a popular book of prayers; the 27th edition bears the date 1677.

== 4 Members ==
Gee married his wife Jane around 1621. They had five children, the eldest son John being born in 1622.
