= St. Brendan's Hospital =

St. Brendan's Hospital may refer to:

- St Brendan's Hospital, Castlebay, a hospital in the Outer Hebrides
- St. Brendan's Hospital (Grangegorman), a psychiatric facility in north Dublin, Ireland
