= Richard Richmond =

Anglican bishop of Sodor and Man from 1773 to 1780

Richard Richmond, LL.D
- Bishop of Sodor and Man
- In office: 1773 to 1780 (death)
- Predecessor: Mark Hiddesley
- Successor: George Mason

Personal details
- Died: 1780
- Denomination: Church of England

Styles of Richard Richmond, LL.D.
- Reference style: The Right Reverend
- Spoken style: My Lord
- Religious style: Bishop

Richard Richmond, LL.D. (died 1780) was an Anglican clergyman who served in the Church of England as the Bishop of Sodor and Man from 1773 to 1780.

He was nominated Bishop of Sodor and Man by John Murray, 3rd Duke of Atholl and Charlotte Murray, Duchess of Atholl on 23 January 1773, and was consecrated on 14 February 1773.

He died in office on 4 February 1780.

Church of England titles
| Preceded by Mark Hiddesley | Bishop of Sodor and Man; 1773–1780 | Succeeded by George Mason |
