= Edward Gee of Eccleston =

Edward Gee (1613–1660) of Eccleston was an English Presbyterian minister, active against the government in the late 1640s.

== Life ==
He was the son of George Gee, who was minister of Newton in the parish of Manchester, and nephew of Edward Gee, vicar of Tedburn St Mary; he was born at Banbury. He was educated at Newton school and entered Brasenose College, Oxford, as a commoner on 26 October 1626, taking the degree of B.A. in October 1630. He proceeded to M.A. in June 1636, having in the meantime entered the ministry.

He became chaplain to Richard Parr, who was both bishop of Sodor and Man at that time and rector of Eccleston, near Chorley, Lancashire. In June 1640 Gee was married at Eccleston to Elizabeth Raymond. Three years later he succeeded Parr as rector of Eccleston, a living in the gift of William Fiennes, 1st Viscount Saye and Sele as guardian of Richard Lathom; but he left the choice of minister to the people, and they nominated Gee. In 1644 (13 December) he was appointed a commissioner to ordain ministers in Lancashire, and in 1646 was elected a member of the sixth classis (Preston) of the Lancashire presbytery; and attained a leading position in that body.

In 1648, he was suspected, along with other Lancashire divines, of corresponding with the Scottish party and of encouraging dissatisfaction with the existing government. He was arrested pursuant to an order of the council of state of 2 September 1651, but was released after a few weeks' confinement.

In 1654, Angier became an assistant commissioner for ejecting "ignorant and scandalous ministers and schoolmasters". In November 1656 he preached a funeral sermon on Richard Hollinworth, and received the thanks of the Manchester classis. He died at Eccleston on 27 May 1660, and was buried in his church there.

== Works ==
In 1648, he signed the ‘Harmonious Consent of the Ministers of the Province of … Lancaster with their Reverend Brethren of … London.’ In February of the same year his name was appended, as scribe to the provincial synod held at Preston, to ‘A Solemn Exhortation made and published to the several Churches of Christ within the Province of Lancaster,’ London, 1649. He was also one of the signers of the answer to the paper called ‘The Agreement of the People,’ 1649. He is credited with writing ‘A Plea for Non (Sub) Scribers, or the Grounds and Reasons of many Ministers … for their Refusall of the late Engagement modestly Propounded,’ 1650, pp. 136. About this time he wrote two other anonymous pamphlets:

- ‘An Exercitation concerning Usurped Power,’ without date.
- ‘A Vindication of the Oath of Allegiance, in answer to a Paper disperst by Mr. Sam. Eaton,’ 1650.

In 1653, he published ‘A Treatise of Prayer and of Divine Providence as relating to it,’ pp. 499, of which there was a second edition in 1666. He was joint author with Hollinworth of a preface to Brownsword's ‘Rome's Conviction,’ 1654, His last publication was ‘The Divine Right and Originall of Civil Magistrates from God Illustrated and Vindicated,’ 1658, apparently written in favour of Charles II, then in exile.
