= John Burgherlin =

Styles of John Burgherlin
- Reference style: The Right Reverend
- Spoken style: My Lord
- Religious style: Bishop

John Burgherlin (Burgherlinus, Burgherssh, Bourgherssh, or Burwais) was a pre-Reformation cleric who was the Bishop of Sodor and Man in the first half of the 15th century.

He appears to have been appointed twice. In the first appointment, dated 30 July 1425, he was called John Burgherlin (Latin: Joannes Burgherlinus) and was a Franciscan friar, but it is uncertain whether he got possession of the see. It may be that Richard Payl was still recognised bishop on the Isle of Man until circa 1429–33. In the second appointment, dated 22 April 1433, he was called John Burwais (Latin: Joannes Burwais) and was a Cluniac monk. He was granted permission by Pope Eugene IV on 18 October 1433 to be consecrated by any Catholic bishop without prejudice as a suffragan to the Archbishop of York.

Because of the different names and religious orders, it is debatable whether it was the same person appointed in 1425 and again 1433, or there were two different people. According to Dowden's The Bishops of Scotland, it was same person. With Eubel's Hierarchia Catholica Medii Aevi, it is not so clear. In each volume of the Hierarchia Catholica Medii Aevi, the last appointee in one volume is shown as the first in the next volume. Burgherlinus was listed as the last appointee in volume 1 and Burwais the first in volume 2, and so he may be the same person but with a different surname and order, or they were two different people.

== Bibliography ==
- Dowden, John (1912). Thomson, J. Maitland (ed.). The Bishops of Scotland. Glasgow: James Maclehose and Son.
- Eubel, Konrad (1913). Hierarchia Catholica Medii Aevi (in Latin). Vol. 1. Monasterii Sumptibus et typis librariae.
- Eubel, Konrad (1914). Hierarchia Catholica Medii Aevi (in Latin). Vol. 2. Monasterii Sumptibus et typis librariae.
- Fryde, E. B.; Greenway, D. E.; Porter, S.; Roy, I., eds. (1986). Handbook of British Chronology (3rd, reprinted 2003 ed.). Cambridge: Cambridge University Press. ISBN 0-521-56350-X.

Catholic Church titles
Preceded by Richard Payl	Bishop of Sodor and Man; 1425/33 – ?	Succeeded by John Seyre
