= Frederick Margetson Rushmore =

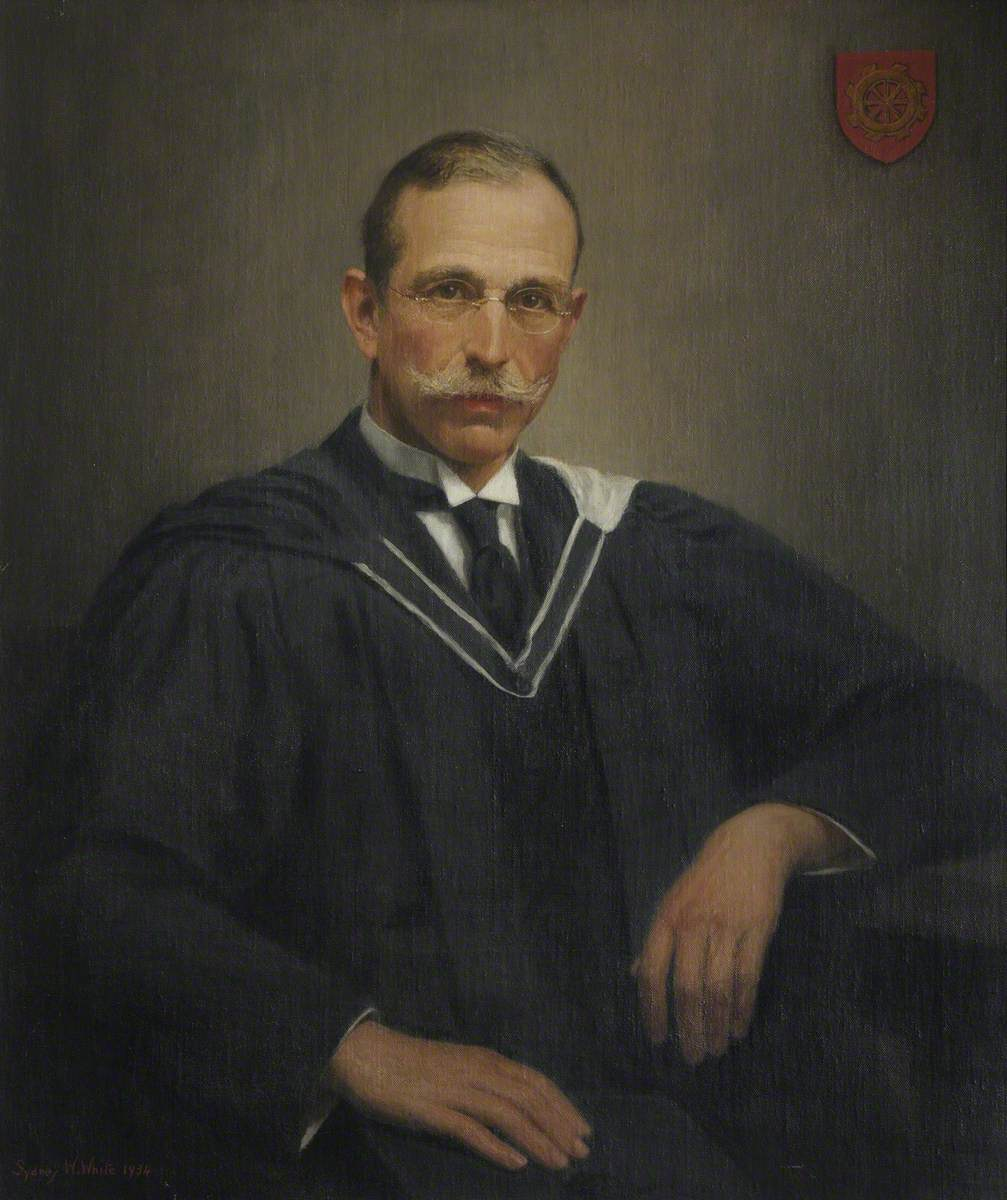
Frederick Margetson Rushmore

Frederick Margetson Rushmore, TD, MA, JP (13 March 1869 – 17 June 1933) was Master of St Catharine's College, Cambridge from 1927 to 1933.

Rushmore was educated at King's College London and St Catharine's College, Cambridge. He was an Assistant Master at The Perse School from 1898 to 1901, and Second Master from 1901 to 1907. He joined the staff of St Catharine's in 1907 as a lecturer in history and became Senior Tutor in 1918. He was elected Master of the college in 1927 and held that position until his death.

He served with the Cambridge University Officers' Training Corps from 1895 to 1919. A Freemason, he was initiated into Isaac Newton University Lodge and was Provincial Grand Master of Cambridgeshire from 1932 to 1933.

Academic offices
Preceded by Thomas Wortley Drury	Master of St Catharine's College, Cambridge; 1927–1933	Succeeded by Henry John Chaytor
