= List of Archdeacons of Anglesey =

The Archdeacon of Anglesey was the priest in charge of the archdeaconry of Anglesey, an administrative division of the Church in Wales Diocese of Bangor. In 1844 the Archdeaconry of Anglesey was combined with the Archdeaconry of Bangor to form the Archdeaconry of Bangor and Anglesey.

In latter years the post of Archdeacon of Anglesey was held in commendam by the Bishop of Bangor.

Due to the restructuring of the Church in Wales, the post was recreated in 2018.

== List of archdeacons of Anglesey ==
- ?–1267: Anian (afterwards Bishop of Bangor, 1267)
- c.1283–1301: Madog ap Cynfrig (Matthew, Madog ab Crenwiz))
- ?–1309: Einion Sais
- 1317: Einion
- 1324: Madog ap Meurig of Anglesey
- 1328: Madog Hedwich
- 1345: John
- ?-1368: Hywel ap Goronwy
- 1368-1395: Thomas Harborough
- 1395-1398: John ap Rhys
- ?-1398: Walter de Swaffham
- 1405: Evan ap Bleddyn
- ?–1410: Thomas Hywel
- 1410-1413: John Wolde
- 1413-?: Thomas Hywel (2nd term)
- 1428, 1440: Andrew Holes
- 1446, 1452: William Saundir
- 1469–1474: William Moggys
- 1474-?: Nicholas ab Ellis
- ?-1524: Richard Bulkeley
- 1524-1537: William Glynne (died 1537)
- 1537-1554: John Salisbury (John of Thetford) (Deprived of office, 1554)
- 1554–?1555: Georgius Griffith
- 1555–1558: William Glyn (died 1558) (also Bishop of Bangor)
- 1558–1559: Griffith Robert (Deprived of office, 1559)
- ?1559–1570: John Salisbury (Reinstated in office)
- ?–1585: ?? (died 1585)
- 1585–?: Owen Owen
- 1588–1593: Henry Rowlands (afterwards Dean of Bangor, 1593)
- 1593–1844 Post held in commendam by the Bishop of Bangor
- 1844: Archdeaconry merged with Bangor Archdeaconry - See Archdeacon of Bangor
- 6 May 2018 – 24 July 2022 (ret.): Andy Herrick
- 1 October 2022 – present John Harvey

John Christopher Harvey (born 1965) was collated Archdeacon of Anglesey on 1 October 2022. Having first studied at St David's University College, Lampeter, he then trained for the ministry at Lincoln Theological College. Harvey was made deacon at Petertide 1989 (24 June) and ordained priest the following Petertide (1 July 1990) — both times by Cledan Mears, Bishop of Bangor, at Bangor Cathedral. He served his title (curacy) at Dwygyfylchi then became Vicar of Llangrannog and area dean; he moved to the Diocese of St Asaph, where he served in various parochial and diocesan roles for a total of 20 years before returning to Bangor as an archdeacon.
