= John Sproten =

British Catholic bishop

John Sproten O.Praed
- Bishop of Sodor and Man
- In office: 1392 – before 1402
- Predecessor: John Dongan
- Successor: Conrad

Personal details
- Denomination: Roman Catholic

Styles of John Sproten, O.P.
- Reference style: The Right Reverend
- Spoken style: My Lord
- Religious style: Bishop

John Sproten was a pre-Reformation cleric who was appointed the Bishop of Sodor and Man in the late 14th century.

A Dominican friar, he was appointed the bishop of the diocese of Sodor and Man by Pope Boniface IX on 16 April 1392. It is not known when his episcopate ended, but his successor Conrad was appointed on 9 January 1402.

Catholic Church titles
Preceded by John Dongan	Bishop of Sodor and Man; 1392 – ?	Succeeded by Conrad
