= John Howden (bishop) =

John Howden O.Praed, D.D
- Bishop of Sodor and Man
- Appointed: 18 May or 19 June 1523
- In office: 1523 – before 1542
- Predecessor: Huan Hesketh
- Successor: Thomas Stanley (bishop)

Personal details
- Denomination: Roman Catholic

Styles of John Howden, O.P., D.D.,
- Reference style: The Right Reverend
- Spoken style: My Lord
- Religious style: Bishop

John Howden, O.P., D.D., was a pre-Reformation clergyman who served as the Bishop of Sodor and Man.

A Dominican friar, he was appointed the bishop of the Diocese of Sodor and Man by papal provision on 18 May or 19 June 1523. He is said to have vacated the see by 17 February 1530, however, a bishop "John" was mentioned in documents in July 1532 and 2 July 1533. The next certain bishop of Sodor and Man was Thomas Stanley who was appointed to the see in 1542.

Catholic Church titles
Preceded by Huan Hesketh	Bishop of Sodor and Man; 1523 – c. 1530/33	Succeeded by Thomas Stanley
