= Brandon of Man =

Former Bishop of Man

Saint Brandon of Man

Bishop of Man
- Died: Approximately c. 1025
- Venerated in: Roman Catholic Church; Eastern Orthodox Church
- Feast: 20 October

Saint Brandon of Man (Manx: Braddan ny Mannin), also referred to as Brandinus, or Brendinus was Bishop of Man until approximately 1025 CE. The parish of Braddan is said to be named after him, although there have been alternative suggestions that this parish is named after St Brendan the Navigator or after the Manx word for salmon.

His feast day is celebrated on 20 October in the Eastern Orthodox Church.
