= Tedburn St Mary =

Village in Devon, England

Coordinates: 50°44′N 3°41′W

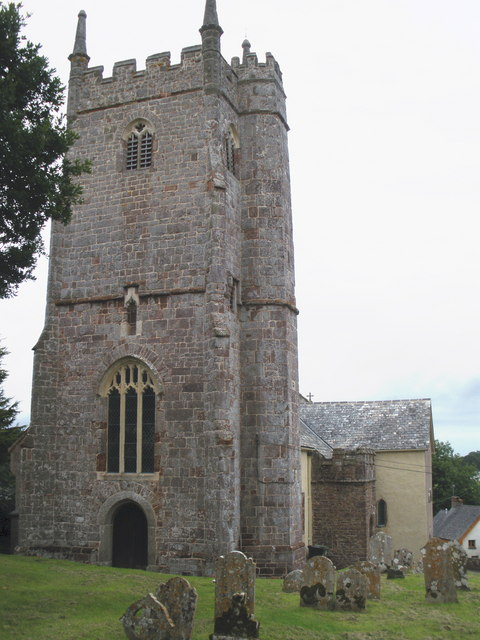
Tedburn church

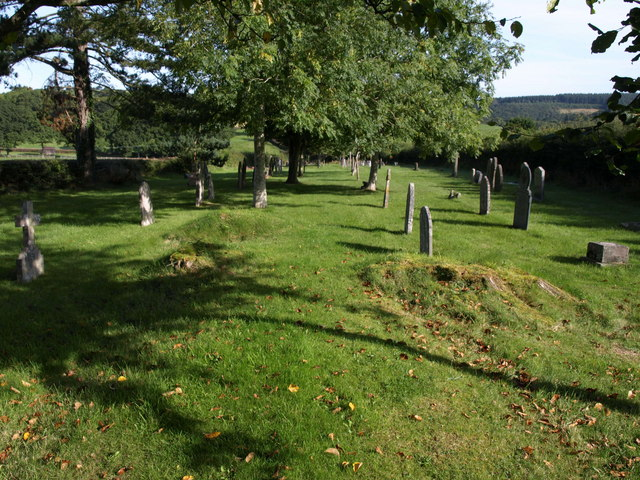
The cemetery, established in 1886

Tedburn St Mary is a village and civil parish in the Teignbridge district of Devon, England, approximately 8 miles west of Exeter. According to the 2021 census, it had a population of 1,550, which was slightly more than the 1,472 recorded at the 2011 census. The village is the principal population centre of the electoral ward called Teignbridge North. The population of the ward at the 2011 census is 2,715.

The Grade II* listed church of St Mary is at Town Barton, the former site of the village which is northwest of the present one. The west tower has diagonal buttresses and a polygonal stair turret. The nave is unusually wide; the north transept and the north aisle may be 14th century. The chancel was rebuilt in 1868.

Edward Gee was rector of Tedburn St Mary from 1599 to 1618.

Tedburn St Mary won the Calor Village of the Year competition in 2001.

== See also ==
- List of places in Devon
