= Storm Brendan =

Storm Brendan may refer to:

- Typhoon Brendan (1991), developed in the Pacific, struck China
- Tropical Storm Brendan (1994), developed in the Philippine Sea, struck Japan and Korea
- Storm Brendan in the 2019–20 European windstorm season
