= St Brendan's GAA =

St Brendan's GAA may refer to:

- St Brendan's Board GAA, a divisional team in County Kerry
- St Brendan's GAA (Dublin), a sports club in Grangegorman, Ireland
- St Brendan's GAA (Galway), a Gaelic football club in Ballygar-Newbridge, Co.Galway, Ireland
- St Brendan's GAA (Waterford), a group of Gaelic football clubs, based in east County Waterford, Ireland
- St Brendan's Hurling Club, a hurling club in Ardfert, County Kerry
- St Brendan's GFC (London), a sports club from London
- St Brendan's GAA (Manchester), a Gaelic football club in Trafford, Manchester.
