= Uist and Barra Hospital =

- NHS Western Isles
- Shown on Benbecula Shown in the Outer Hebrides

Geography
- Location: Benbecula, Eileanan Siar, Scotland, United Kingdom
- Coordinates: 57°28′25″N 7°23′8″W

Organisation
- Care system: NHS Scotland
- Type: Remote community hospital
- Affiliated university: None

Services
- Emergency department: Yes Accident & Emergency
- Beds: 29

History
- Founded: 2001

Links
- Website: www.wihb.scot.nhs.uk/ospadal-uibhist-agus-bharraigh
- Lists: Hospitals in Scotland

Ospadal Uibhist agus Bharraigh (Uist and Barra Hospital) is a community hospital in Benbecula which provides services on the islands of North Uist, South Uist and Benbecula in the Western Isles of Scotland. It is managed by NHS Western Isles.

== History ==
The hospital, which replaced a 21-bed hospital in Daliburgh and a 25-bed care of the elderly hospital in Lochmaddy, opened in 2001. In 2008 a £500,000 endoscopy suite opened.

In December 2014, NHS Western Isles announced plans to close three dental surgeries which need renovation on the Uists and move the services to the hospital. At the same time, the board proposed decreasing the number of staffed beds from 29 to 16.

== Services ==
The hospital has 29 beds, and provides care of the elderly, GP Acute and Midwifery led maternity services.
