= Saint Brendan Church =

Topics referred to by the same name

Saint Brendan Church may refer to:

- St. Brendan Catholic Church, Los Angeles, California, USA
- St. Brendan Church in San Francisco, California, USA
- St. Brendan's Church (Bronx, New York), New York, USA
- Saint Brendan the Navigator Church, Columbus, Ohio, USA
