= Horatio Powys =

English bishop (1805–1877)

- Bishop of Sodor and Man
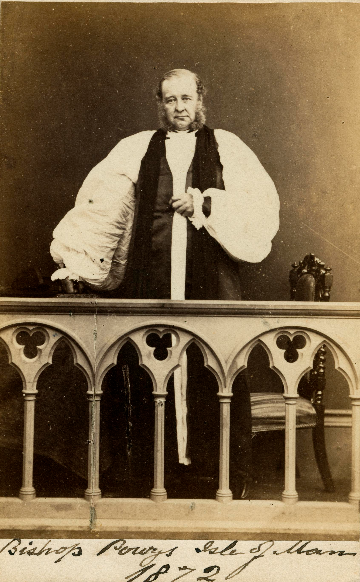
- Installed: 1854
- Term ended: 1877 (death)
- Predecessor: Robert Eden
- Successor: Rowley Hill

Personal details
- Born: 5 November 1805
- Died: 31 May 1877 (aged 71) Bournemouth, Dorset, England
- Buried: Warrington, Cheshire, England
- Spouse: Percy Gore (m. 1833)
- Children: 8
- Education: Harrow School; St. John's College, Cambridge

Styles of Horatio Powys
- Reference style: The Right Reverend
- Spoken style: My Lord
- Religious style: Bishop

Horatio Powys (20 November 1805 – 31 May 1877) was a priest in the Church of England and Bishop of Sodor and Man.

Powys was the third son of Thomas Powys, 2nd Baron Lilford (1775–1825), by Henrietta Maria, eldest daughter of Robert Vernon Atherton of Atherton Hall, Lancashire. He was educated at Harrow and at St. John's College, Cambridge, where he graduated M.A. in 1826, and was later created D.D. in 1854.

In 1831, he became the rector of the parish of Warrington, Lancashire and he was for some time rural dean of Cheshire. Strongly impressed with the necessity for improved education, he succeeded in establishing the training college at Chester and the institution for the education of the daughters of the clergy at Warrington, both of which proved permanently successful. On 5 July 1854 he was nominated to the bishopric of Sodor and Man. He made successful endeavours to uphold the rights of the see, and involved himself in much litigation, including a lengthy dispute with the Rev. William Drury, the Vicar of Kirk Braddan, over the patronage of St Thomas' Church, Douglas, which was closed for over a year as a consequence.

Powys was unpopular among most of the Manx clergy due to his High Church views and contentious nature. After his health began to decline in 1873, he spent much time in England, and his episcopal duties were undertaken by other bishops on Powys' commission. He printed two charges, A Pastoral Letter to the Congregation at Warrington, 1848, and two sermons.

== Death and legacy ==
He died of cancer at Bewsey House, Bournemouth, on 31 May 1877, and was buried at Warrington on 5 June. He married, on 21 February 1833, Percy Gore, eldest daughter of William Currie of East Horsley Park, Surrey, and had issue: Horace (d 1857); Percy William, rector of Thorpe-Achurch, Northamptonshire; Henry Lyttleton, lieutenant-colonel of the Oxfordshire light infantry; and five daughters.

Church of England titles
Preceded by Robert Eden	Bishop of Sodor and Man; 1854–1877	Succeeded by Rowley Hill
