= Thomas Burton (bishop) =

Thomas Burton OFM
- Bishop of Sodor and Man
- In office: 1455–1458
- Predecessor: John Seyre
- Successor: Thomas Kirkham

Personal details
- Died: 1458
- Denomination: Roman Catholic

Styles of Thomas Burton
- Reference style: The Right Reverend
- Spoken style: My Lord
- Religious style: Bishop

Thomas Burton OFM, (died 1458) was a pre-Reformation prelate who served as the Bishop of Sodor and Man from 1455 to 1458.

A Franciscan friar, he was appointed bishop of the Diocese of Sodor and Man on 21 June or 25 September 1455. He held the see for two and a half years and died in office after 18 February 1458.

Catholic Church titles
Preceded by John Seyre	Bishop of Sodor and Man; 1455–1458	Succeeded by Thomas Kirkham
