= Bishop of Sodor and Man =

Diocesan bishop in the Church of England

- Bishopric

anglican
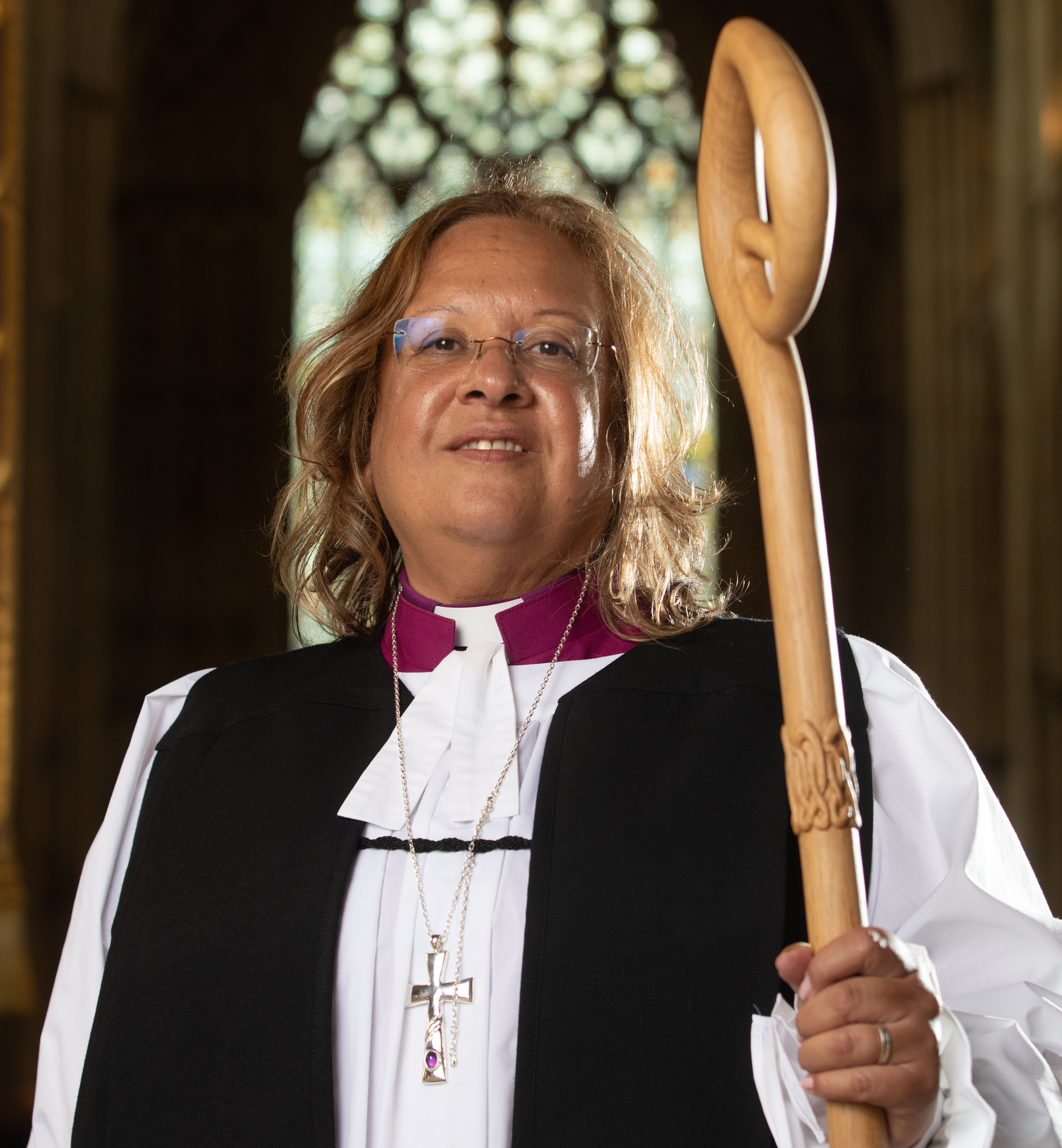
- Incumbent; Tricia Hillas

Location
- Ecclesiastical province: York
- Residence: Thie yn Aspick, Douglas

Information
- Diocese: Sodor and Man
- Cathedral: St German's, Peel

Website
- www.sodorandman.im/bishops_office/

The Bishop of Sodor and Man (Manx: Aspick Sodor as Vannin) is the Ordinary of the Diocese of Sodor and Man (Sodor as Mannin) in the Province of York in the Church of England. The diocese solely covers the Isle of Man. The Cathedral Church of St German, where the bishop's seat is located, is in the town of Peel on the Isle of Man. St German's was elevated to cathedral status on 1 November 1980.

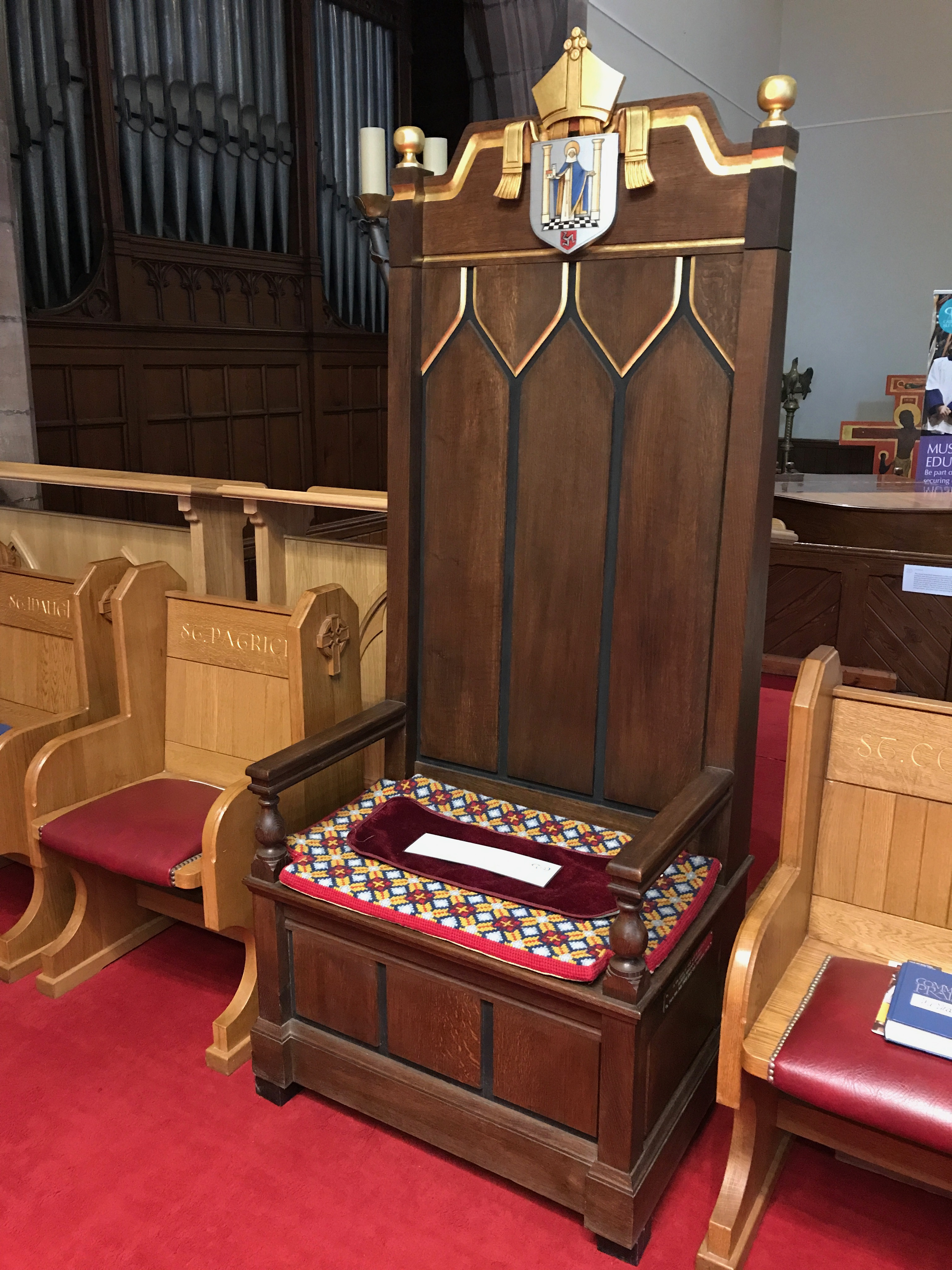
Cathedra (throne) of the Bishop of Sodor and Man, in Peel Cathedral.

The bishop is an ex officio member of the Legislative Council of the Isle of Man (the upper house of Tynwald, the parliament of the Isle of Man) and of Tynwald Court. The bishop's residence is Thie yn Aspick (Bishop's House), Douglas.

The right to appoint the Bishop of Sodor and Man is vested in the British crown; the Monarch acts, perhaps somewhat anomalously (in view of Man's status as a Crown Dependency), on the advice of the Prime Minister (rather than the island's Chief Minister). However, unlike diocesan bishops in England, who are formally elected by the canons of the cathedral church in accordance with the monarch's congé d'elire, the Bishop of Sodor and Man is appointed directly by the monarch by letters patent.

Peter Eagles was appointed Bishop of Sodor and Man, and was installed at the Cathedral Church of St German at Peel on 30 September 2017. He retired effective 31 October 2023. Tricia Hillas became the current Bishop of Sodor and Man in October 2024.

== Diocese ==
The name Sodor and Man is from an earlier diocese which included not only the Isle of Man but also the Hebrides. The name for this whole area in the original Norse was Suðreyjar (Sudreys or 'southern isles'). In Latin, the corresponding adjective was Sodorensis, later abbreviated in the English title as Sodor. In the Middle Ages, the diocese was considered part of Scotland, and was under the control of neither the Archbishop of York nor the Archbishop of Canterbury. During the Great Schism, the Pope created a different line of bishops in the southern part of the diocese which became part of the Church of England. An Act of Parliament in 1542, during the reign of King Henry VIII, included the diocese in the Province of York. The termination "and Man" appears to have been added in the 17th century, as later generations did not realise that Sodor originally included the Isle of Man. The designation "Sodor and Man" had become a fixture by 1684.

== Tables ==
The Arms of the Bishop of Sodor and Man

(Dates in italics indicate de facto continuation of office)

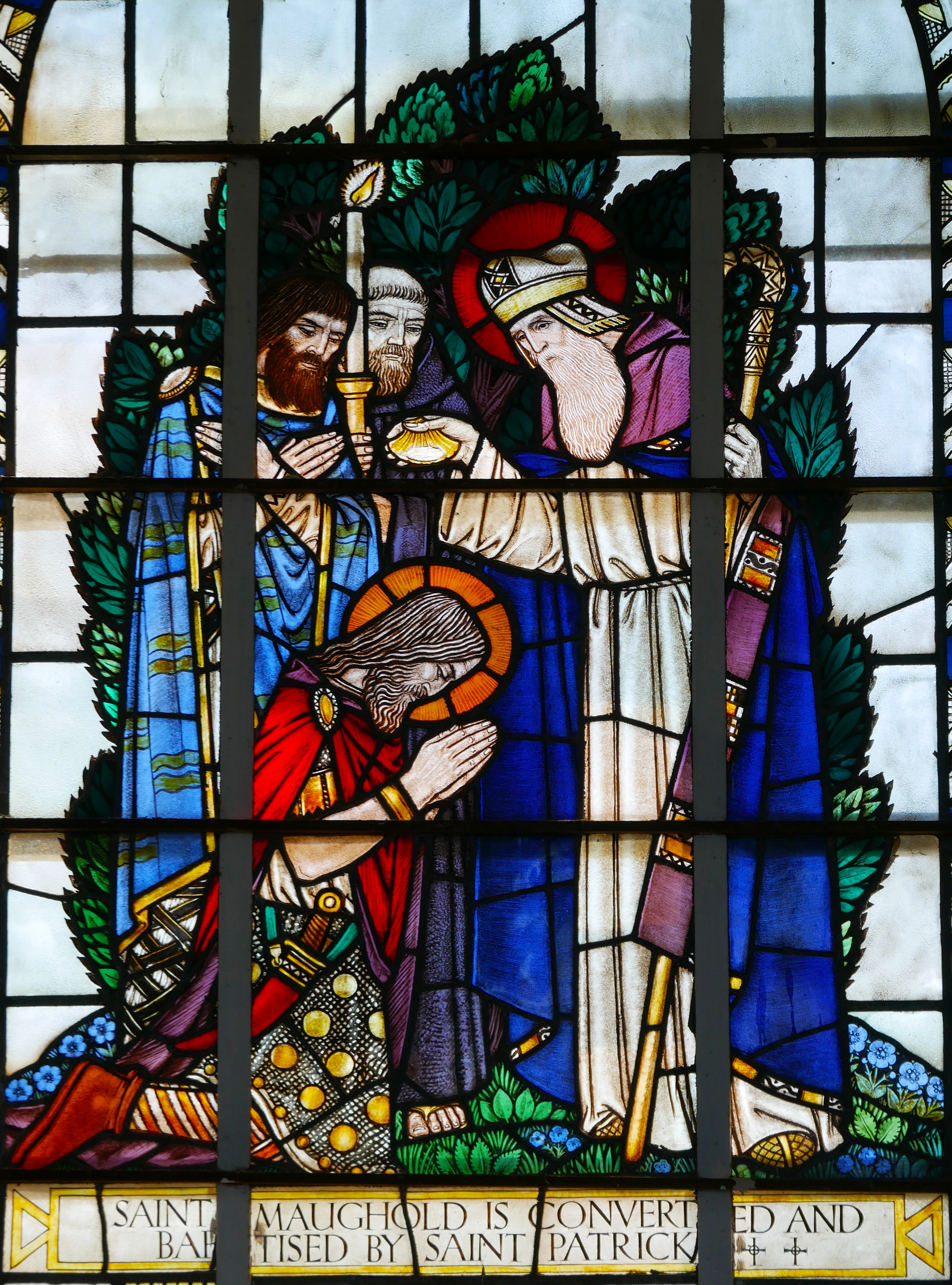
Stained glass in Jurby depicting the baptism of Maughold by Saint Patrick; Maughold later became Bishop of Man.

=== List of known Bishops of Man ===
Tenure	Incumbent	Notes
Dates unknown	Germanus	See discussion of conflation of at least two men of similar names in medieval traditions in the Great Britain section of Germanus of Auxerre
fl. 447	Conindrius	
Dates unknown	Romulus	
fl. 498	St Maughold	Later, often Latinized as Machutus despite being unconnected with both St Mechyll and St Malo. Patron saint of the island.
fl. 648	Saint Conanus	
Dates unknown	Contentus	
Dates unknown	Baldus	
Dates unknown	Malchus	
fl. 889	Torkinus	
Dates unknown	Brandon of Man	
Before 1079	Roolwer	Also called Rolf
Before 1079	William	
fl. 1079x1095	Hamond	

=== List of Bishops of Man and the Isles ===
The bishops of Man and the Isles (Latin: Manniae et Insularum) were also styled bishops of Sodor (Old Norse: Suðreyjar; Latin: Sodoren; meaning Southern Isles, which comprised the Hebrides, the islands of the Firth of Clyde and the Isle of Man).

Tenure	Incumbent	Notes
1134–38 to c.1148	Wimund	Also known as Reymundus
c.1148	Nicholas (bishop-elect)	
1151 to 1154	John (I)	Formerly a monk of Sées, Normandy
c.1154 to bef.1166	Gamaliel	
bef.1166 to c.1170	Reginald (I)	
c.1170 to c.1190s	Christian	Either a native of Argyll (Latin: Ergadiensis) or of Orkney (Latin: Orcadensis)
1188–94 to 1203	Michael	Died in office
1210 to 1217	Nicholas	
1217 to 1226	Reginald (II)	
1219 to 1225–26	Nicholas de Meaux	Abbot of Furness
Until bef.1230	John (II), son of Hefar	
1230 to 1248	Simon	Either a native of Argyll (Latin: Ergadiensis) or of Orkney (Latin: Orcadensis).
1248 to 1249	Laurence (bishop-elect)	Archdeacon of Man; shipwrecked and drowned on voyage from Norway before taking up the office
1249 to 1252	See vacant	
1253 to 1274	Richard [de Natherton?]	Died in office.
1275	Gilbert (bishop-elect)	Elected, but not confirmed.
1275–76 to 1303	Mark	Marcus, Mauritius; a native of Galloway; promoted by Alexander III, King of Scotland; died in office
1303 to 1305	See vacant	
1305 to 1321	Alan	Died in office
1321 to 1326–27	Gilbert Maclelan	Scottish Gaelic: Giolla-Brighde Mac Giolla-Faoláin; a native of Galloway; died in office
1327–28 to 1331	Bernard of Kilwinning	Abbot of Kilwinning, Scotland
1331	Cormac Cormacii (bishop-elect)	Scottish Gaelic: Cormac Mac Chormaic; elected before 6 July 1331, but was not confirmed.
1331 to 1348	Thomas de Rossy	Died in office
1349 to 1374	William Russell	Abbot of Rushen; died in office.
1374 to 1387	John Dongan	Lost control of the northern part of the see (the Scottish isles) in 1387, but retained the Isle of Man.

=== List of Bishops of Sodor and Man ===
Tenure	Incumbent	Notes
1387 to 1391	John Dongan	Translated to Derry and later to Down.
From 1392	John Sproten, O.Praed.	Dominican friar.
1402	Conrad, O.Cist.	Cistercian monk.
From 1402	Theodore Bloc, O.Crucif.	Monk of the Order of the Crucifers.
1410 to c.1429–33	Richard Payl, O.Praed.	Richard Pawlie, Payli, or Pully; Dominican friar; translated from Dromore.
From 1425–33	John Burgherlin	Burgherlinus, Burgherssh, Bourgherssh, or Burwais; Franciscan friar or Cluniac monk.
From 1435	John Seyre	John Feyre.
1455 to 1458	Thomas Burton, O.F.M.	Franciscan friar; died in office.
From 1458	Thomas Kirkham, O.Cist.	Abbot of Vale Royal, Cheshire; elected 21 June 1458
1478 to 1485/86	Richard Oldham, O.S.B.	Abbot of Chester (1455–1485); died 13 October 1485 or 19 September 1486
1487 to 1509	Huan Blackleach, O.S.A.	Austin friar.
From 1513	Huan Hesketh	
From 1523	John Howden, O.Praed.	Dominican friar.
Until 1545	Thomas Stanley	Rector of Wigan; deprived
1546 to 1555–56	Henry Man	Dean of Chester; Royal Assent to election given by King Henry VIII on 22 January 1546.
1555–56 to 1568	Thomas Stanley	Rector of Winwick as well as Berwick; restored by Queen Mary; died in office.
1570 to 1573	John Salisbury	Former Premonstratensian canon and abbot of Titchfield Abbey; translated from Thetford. Nominated 27 March 1569
1573 to 1576	See vacant. According to John Le Neve, James Stanley held the see during that period but nothing further about him is known.	
1576 to 1599	John Meyrick	John Merick, Mericke, or Merrick; Vicar of Hornchurch, Essex (1570–74); died in office
1599 to 1604	George Lloyd	(From 1600 according to Haydn); rector of Heswall, Lancashire; translated to Chester
1604 to 1633	John Phillips	John Philips; Archdeacon of Cleveland and Man; nominated by King James I 29 January 1604; consecrated 10 February 1604; judged the trial of the Island's only Witchcraft execution in 1617; died in office
1634 or 1633, to 1635	William Forster	William Foster; Prebendary of Chester
1635 to 1643	Richard Parr	Rector of Lancashire; died in office
1643 to 1646	See vacant	
1646 to 1660	See abolished (by Westminster Parliament on 9 October 1646.) during the Commonwealth and the Protectorate	
1661 to 1663	Samuel Rutter	Archdeacon of Man
1663 to 1671	Isaac Barrow	Fellow of Eton College; translated to St Asaph in 1670 but held Sodor & Man in commendam until 1671
1671 to 1682	Henry Bridgeman	Dean of Chester
1682 to 1684	John Lake	Archdeacon of Cleveland; translated to Bristol
1684 to 1692	Baptist Levinz	Baptiste or Baptist Levinge; Prebendary of Winchester
1693 to 1697	See vacant	
1697 or 1698, to 1755	Thomas Wilson	Of Trinity College, Dublin; died in office
1755 to 1773	Mark Hiddesley	Mark Hildesley; Vicar of Hitchin, Hertfordshire
1773 to 1780	Richard Richmond	
1780 to 1783	George Mason	Died in office
1784 to 1813	Claudius Crigan	
1813 or 1814, to 1827	George Murray	Translated to Rochester
1827 to 1838	William Ward	Died in office
1838 to 1839	James Bowstead	Translated to Lichfield
1839 or 1840, to 1841	Henry Pepys	Translated to Worcester
1841 to 1846	Thomas Vowler Short	Rector of St George's, Bloomsbury; translated to St Asaph
1846 to 1847	Walter Shirley	Died in office
1847 to 1854	Robert Eden	Translated to Bath & Wells
1854 to 1877	Horatio Powys	Rector of Warrington and rural dean; died in office
1877 to 1887	Rowley Hill	Canon of York; died in office
1887 to 1892	John Bardsley	Archdeacon of Warrington; translated to Carlisle
1892 to 1907	Norman Straton	Translated to Newcastle
1907 to 1911	Thomas Drury	Son of Rev William Drury (vicar of Braddan 1847-1887). Translated to Ripon
1911 to 1925	Denton Thompson	
1925 to 1928	Charles Thornton-Duesbury	
1928 to 1943	William Stanton Jones	
1943 to 1954	John Taylor	
1954 to 1966	Benjamin Pollard	Translated from Lancaster.
1966 to 1974	Eric Gordon	
1974 to 1983	Vernon Nicholls	
1983 to 1989	Arthur Attwell	
1989 to 2003	Noël Jones	Formerly Archdeacon of the Royal Navy.
2003 to 2007	Graeme Knowles	Resigned on 1 October 2007 and became Dean of St Paul's, London.
2008 to 2016	Robert Paterson	Consecrated 25 April 2008 at York Minster; enthroned 14 June 2008 in St German's Cathedral at Peel; retired 11 November 2016.
2017 to 2023	Peter Eagles	Previously Archdeacon of the Army; consecrated 22 June 2017, and enthroned 30 September 2017. Retired 31 October 2023.
2024 to present	Tricia Hillas	The see's first female bishop. Consecrated 10 October 2024 and enthroned 16 November 2024.

== Assistant bishops ==
In contrast with mainland dioceses, the Manx diocese did not formerly have assistant bishops, whether full- or part-time, stipendiary or retired. In recent years assistant bishops have been appointed ad hoc to exercise delegated functions in relation to clergy discipline, or in the absence of the diocesan bishop on leave. The Rt Rev Mark Davies, suffragan bishop of Middleton in the diocese of Manchester, was appointed assistant bishop of Sodor and Man on 13 May 2025. The diocese has never had a suffragan bishop.

== In fiction ==
The Bishop of Sodor and Man is mentioned in the song "If you Want a Receipt for that Popular Mystery" sung by Colonel Calverley in the operetta Patience (1881) by Gilbert and Sullivan. The song lists the elements of a Heavy Dragoon, including "Style of the Bishop of Sodor and Man". The reference is to Rowley Hill (Bishop 1877–1887).

The Island of Sodor, the main setting of The Railway Series and Thomas & Friends, is named after, and part of, the diocese. In addition, the Sudrian Locale known popularly as Rolf's Castle is named after Roolwer.

== See also ==
- Lords Spiritual
