= Henry Man (bishop) =

English clergyman

- Bishop of Sodor and Man
- Arms of Henry Man: Azure, a mascle fleur-de-lysé or, within and without five young men's heads couped argent crined or
- Diocese: Diocese of Sodor and Man
- In office: 1546–1555/6
- Other posts: Prior of Witham (1534–35); Prior of Sheen (1535–39); Dean of Chester (1541–47)

Orders
- Consecration: 14 February 1546

Personal details
- Died: 19 October 1556
- Buried: St Andrew Undershaft, London
- Denomination: Catholic / Anglican

Henry Man (died 19 October 1556) was an English clergyman who served as the Bishop of Sodor and Man in the 16th century.

Until the English Reformation he was a Carthusian monk who had been appointed the Prior of Witham, Somerset (1534–35) and then the Prior of Sheen, Surrey (1535–39). Following the dissolution of the monasteries, he was briefly a chaplain to King Henry VIII. He was appointed the Dean of Chester in 1541, also holding the rectories of St Mary on the Hill, Chester and Fyningley, Nottinghamshire.

He was nominated Bishop of Sodor and Man in January 1546 and consecrated at Old St Paul's Cathedral on 14 February 1546 by bishops Bonner, Chetham and Hodgkins. He continued to hold the deanery of Chester in commendam for another year before resigning the post by 31 May 1547. After the accession of Queen Mary I, he was deprived of the see and his predecessor Thomas Stanley was restored in 1555 or 1556.

Henry died on 19 October 1556 and was buried at St Andrew Undershaft, London. He had become a Doctor of Divinity (DD).

Church of England titles
Preceded by Thomas Clerk	Dean of Chester; 1541–47	Succeeded by William Clyff
Preceded by Thomas Stanley	Bishop of Sodor and Man; 1546–55/56	Succeeded by Thomas Stanley
