= St Brendan's Hospital, Castlebay =

St Brendan's Hospital
- NHS Western Isles
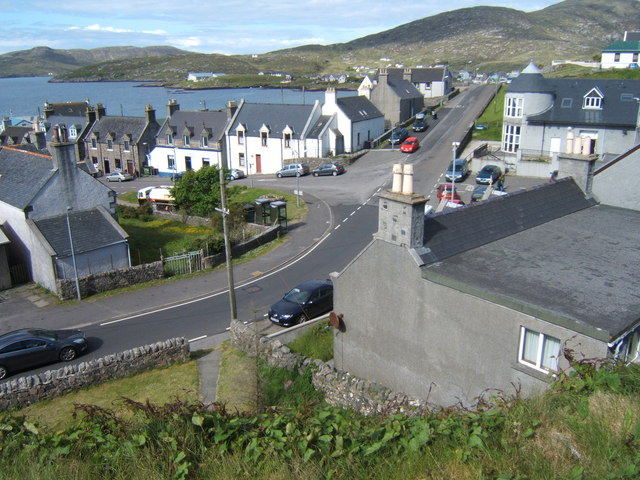
- Castlebay (the hospital can be seen on the tip of the promontory in the middle distance on the left of the photograph)

- Shown on Barra

Geography
- Location: Castlebay, Barra, Outer Hebrides, Scotland
- Coordinates: 56°57′8″N 7°29′50″W

Organisation
- Care system: NHS Scotland
- Type: Community

Services
- Emergency department: No
- Beds: 5

Links
- Website: Official website

St Brendan's Hospital is a hospital in Castlebay on the island of Barra, Eileanan Siar. It is managed by NHS Western Isles.

== History ==
The current facility, which was originally staffed by nuns from the Society of the Sacred Heart as well as qualified nurses, was opened in September 1980. In April 2018 NHS Western Isles announced that it intended to replace the current aging facility which it described as "completely unacceptable".

== Services ==
The present facility comprises a 10-bedroom care home and five-bed hospital.
