= Edward Gee (priest, born 1565) =

English Priest

Edward Gee (1565–1618) was an English cleric, academic, and fellow of Chelsea College.

== Life ==
The son of Ralph Gee of Manchester, he entered Merton College, Oxford as servitor, on 22 February 1583. Later he was at Lincoln College and Brasenose College. He graduated B.A. in 1586, and then after two years was elected fellow of Brasenose. In 1590 he proceeded M.A., in 1598 was chosen proctor of the university, in 1600 took the degree of B.D., and in 1616 became D.D.

On 19 September 1599 Gee was instituted rector of Tedburn St. Mary in Devon, on the presentation of the Queen. He was also chaplain in ordinary to James I and a fellow of Chelsea College, where he was appointed by Matthew Sutcliffe, the founder. Lord Chancellor Egerton made him his chaplain, and presented him in 1616 to a prebend in Exeter Cathedral.

Gee died at Tedburn, in the winter of 1618.

== Works ==
After Gee's death his brothers, John Gee the vicar of Dunsford in Devon, and George Gee who was a minister in Lancashire, published his Two Sermons: One, The Curse and Crime of Meroz. Preached at the Asises at Exon. The Other, a Sermon of Patience, at St. Maries in Oxford, London, 1620.

== Family ==
Gee's wife Jane died at Tedburn in 1613, and a lengthy epitaph was on a brass removed in the 19th century (published in John Prince's Worthies of Devon, and Richard Polwhele's History of Devonshire). He married again, and left a widow named Mary. Edward Gee of Eccleston and John Gee were his nephews.

== Notes ==
Attribution

This article incorporates text from a publication now in the public domain: Stephen, Leslie, ed. (1890). "Gee, Edward (1565-1618)". Dictionary of National Biography. Vol. 21. London: Smith, Elder & Co.
