= John Phillips (bishop of Sodor and Man) =

Anglican Bishop of Sodor and Man between 1604 and 1633

- Bishop of Sodor and Man
- Installed: 1604
- Term ended: 1633 (death)
- Predecessor: George Lloyd
- Successor: William Forster

Personal details
- Born: John Phillips c. 1555 Wales
- Died: 1633 (aged 77–78) Ballaugh, Isle of Man
- Buried: St Germans Cathedral, Peel, Isle of Man
- Denomination: Church of England
- Education: St Mary Hall, Oxford

John Phillips (ca. 1555 – 7 August 1633) was the Anglican Bishop of Sodor and Man between 1604 and 1633. He is best known for writing the first dateable text in the Manx language in his translation of the 1604 Book of Common Prayer in 1610.

== Early life ==
He was born in Wales and educated at St Mary Hall, Oxford, graduating B.A. in 1579 and M.A. in 1584.

== Career ==
Styles of John Phillips
- Reference style: The Right Reverend
- Spoken style: My Lord
- Religious style: Bishop

In 1579 he became rector of Sessay in the North Riding of Yorkshire and in 1583 rector of Thorpe Bassett in the East Riding of Yorkshire. He was collated Archdeacon of Man in 1587 and made rector of Andreas on the Isle of Man. In 1590 he was appointed chaplain to Henry Stanley, 4th Earl of Derby. In 1591 he was made rector of Slingsby in the North Riding of Yorkshire and in 1601 appointed archdeacon of Cleveland. In 1605 he followed George Lloyd as bishop of Sodor and Man, retaining in commendam the archdeaconry of Man and his English preferments.

In 1617, Phillips presided as a judge over the witchcraft trial of Margaret Quaine and her son Robert. When the jury had reached their verdict of not-guilty, Phillips was instructed to leave the room before the witches were sentenced to death, as the Bishop's position in the church prevented him from direct involvement in the legal shedding of blood.

He died in 1633 at Bishop's Court, in the parish of Ballaugh and was buried in St Germans Cathedral, Peel.

He was succeeded as Bishop of Sodor and Man by William Foster.

== Writing Manx ==
In order to preach to the Manx peasantry, Phillips translated the Book of Common Prayer into the Manx language in 1610 but it was not published at the time and the orthography he created was never commonly used. It is thought to be based on the phonetics of Yorkshire English, which suggests it was written by someone else as opposed to him, as he was Welsh born. A new translation with a new more consistent orthography was authorised under Bishop Thomas Wilson in 1765.

Despite never being wildly used, the orthography that Phillips created has been criticised by Manx language scholars in subsequent centuries. It was described by Gaelic linguistics scholar T.F. O'Rahilly as being "an abominable system, neither historic nor phonetic, and based mainly on English.” In 1895 A. W. Moore and Sir John Rhŷs edited and published Phillip's manuscript version of the Book of Common Prayer and set it alongside the reprint 1842 of the later Manx translation from 1765. Moore complained in the introduction of the inconsistencies in the manuscript:

The spelling of the MS., as usual in those days, is very careless, the same word being spelled in half a dozen different ways. The more flagrant of these variations have been indicated by (SIC); but they are so numerous that it has not been thought desirable to do so in all cases.

=== Comparison of the first verse of the Athanasian Creed from the Book of Common Prayer ===
Phillips' 1610 translation	1765 translation	1662 English version
Quei erbi sailish vé erna hauáyl, roish dygh ully redd té ymmyrtyssagh gy gumm e yn krediu kasserick.	Quoi-erbee saillish dy v’er ny hauail: roish dy chooilley nhee te ymmyrchagh dy gum eh yn Credjue Cadjin [Creestee].	Whosoever will be saved: before all things it is necessary that he hold the Catholick Faith.

== Portrayal in media ==
Phillips was portrayed by Wayne Kelsall in the movie Solace in Wicca, a biographical drama about the execution of Margaret Quaine and her son Robert; the filmmaker's decision to portray Phillips as a villain was met with some criticism from Manx language enthusiasts.

== Sources ==
- Dictionary of National Biography, 1885-1900, Volume 45 Phillips, John (1555?-1633) by Alexander Gordon
- http://www.isle-of-man.com/manxnotebook/people/bishops/phillips.htm
- http://www.britannica.com/eb/topic-456567/John-Phillips
