= Nicholas, Bishop of the Isles =

Nicholas, Bishop of the Isles may refer to:

- Nicholas I (bishop of the Isles) (fl. 1147×1152)
- Nicholas II (bishop of the Isles) (died 1217)
- Nicholas de Meaux (fl. thirteenth century)
