= Archibald Graham =

Archibald Graham may refer to:

== Sports ==
- Archibald Wright "Moonlight" Graham or Moonlight Graham (died 1965), US baseball player
- Archibald Graham (cricketer) (1917-2000), New Zealand cricketer
- Archibald Graham (golfer) in United States Amateur Championship (golf)
- Archie Graham (rugby union), Namibian player in 2003 Rugby World Cup squads

== Others ==
- Archibald Graham (bishop) (died 1702), Scottish prelate
- Archie Graham (city councillor), husband of Johann Lamont
