= Andrew Wood (bishop) =

Andrew Wood (c.1617– 1695) was a Scottish minister who served as Protestant Bishop of Caithness.

== Life ==
The son of Rev David Wood, Church of Scotland minister for the parish of Edzell, by a daughter of John Guthrie, Bishop of Moray, he followed his father's career in the ministry. He studied at St Andrews University graduating MA in 1634.

He became minister at Spott in 1643 under the patronage of William the Earl of Roxburghe and in February 1665 he translated to Dunbar, both in East Lothian. In May 1675 he was made Bishop of the Isles in 1680 became Bishop of Caithness. He received dispensation from the king to hold this bishopric while retaining Dunbar.

He held the position of Bishop of Caithness until the Revolution of 1688, when episcopacy was abolished in Scotland and all Church of Scotland bishops lost their sees. He died in Dunbar in 1695, aged 76.

Church of Scotland titles
Preceded by Robert Wallace	Bishop of the Isles; 1678–1680	Succeeded by Archibald Graham
Preceded by Patrick Forbes	Bishop of Caithness; 1680–1688/9	Episcopacy abolished
