= Gille Aldan =

Scottish bishop

Gille (or Gilla) Aldan (Gaelic: "Servant of Saint Aldwin[e]"), of Whithorn, was a native Galwegian who was the first Bishop of the resurrected Bishopric of Whithorn or Galloway. He was the first to be consecrated by the Archbishop of York, who at that time was Thurstan. The re-creation of the Bishopric suited both the ruler of Galloway, Fergus, and the Archbishop, who had few suffragans and needed more in order to maintain his independence from Canterbury.

We have the record of a mandate by Pope Honorius II, dating to December in 1128, confirming that Gille Aldan should seek consecration from Thurstan. Richard Oram argues that the creation of the Bishopric of Whithorn probably encouraged the wrath and enmity of Bishop Wimund of the Isles, who seems to have regarded the area as his natural area of authority. William of Newburgh records that Wimund made an attack on another Bishop in order to extort tribute. If Oram is correct, and his victim was in fact Gilla Aldan, then this attack would make perfect sense, as Wimund's See was the obvious loser out of the deal done between Fergus and York.

Gilla Aldan's name is recorded for the last time in 1151, when he was told by Pope Eugene III to give homage to the new Archbishop of York, Henry Murdac. We know that Gille Aldan was dead by 1154, because in that year his successor Christian was consecrated.

Catholic Church titles
Preceded by Diocese Recreated; See Beadwulf (fl. c. 803)	Bishop of Whithorn; 1128–1154	Succeeded by Christian
