= Reginald (bishop of the Isles) =

Reginald (died c.1226) was an early thirteenth-century Bishop of the Isles. According to the Chronicle of Mann, he was related to the Crovan dynasty, the royal family of the Kingdom of the Isles. The chronicle specifically states that he was the son of a sister of Óláfr Guðrøðarson, King of the Isles (died 1237).

Upon the death of Nicholas, Bishop of the Isles in 1217, two candidates vied for the vacant ecclesiastical position: Reginald and Nicholas de Meaux, Abbot of Furness. Although the monks of Furness Abbey had elected Nicholas de Meaux as Bishop of the Isles—as was their right—Nicholas received opposition from the ruling family of the Isles, and never occupied the see.

== Bibliography ==
- Dowden, J (1912). Thomson, JM (ed.). The Bishops of Scotland. Glasgow: James Maclehose and Sons – via Internet Archive.
- McDonald, RA (2007). Manx Kingship in its Irish Sea Setting, 1187–1229: King Rǫgnvaldr and the Crovan Dynasty. Dublin: Four Courts Press. ISBN 978-1-84682-047-2.
