= Olaf the Black =

Thirteenth-century ruler of the Isle of Man and parts of the Hebrides

Olaf the Black Óláfr Guðrøðarson
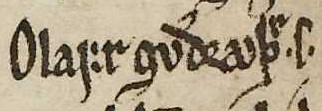
- Óláfr's name as it appears on folio 102v of AM 45 fol (Codex Frisianus): "Olafr Gvðraþr.s."

King of the Isles
- Reign: 1226–1237
- Predecessor: Rǫgnvaldr Guðrøðarson
- Successor: Haraldr Óláfsson
- Died: 21 May 1237; St Patrick's Isle
- Burial: Rushen Abbey
- Spouse: Lauon; Cairistíona inghean Fearchair
- Issue: Haraldr; Rǫgnvaldr; Magnús; Gunni
- House: Crovan dynasty
- Father: Guðrøðr Óláfsson
- Mother: Fionnghuala Nic Lochlainn

Óláfr Guðrøðarson (died 1237) (Scottish Gaelic: Amhlaibh Dubh; English: Olafr Godredsson), also known as Olaf the Black, was a thirteenth-century King of the Isles, and a member of the Crovan dynasty. (Note: Since the 1990s, academics have accorded Óláfr various personal names in English secondary sources: Amhlaibh, Amhlaíbh, Amlaíb, Olaf, Óláf, Óláfr, Ólafr, Olav, and Olavus. During the same period, Óláfr has been accorded various patronyms in English secondary sources: Amhlaíbh Dubh mac Gofhraidh, Amhlaíbh mac Gofhraidh, Olaf Godredsson, Óláf Guðrøðsson, Óláfr Godredsson, Óláfr Godredsson, Ólafr Guðrøðarson, Óláfr Guðrøðarson, Óláfr Guðrøðarsson, Óláfr Gúðrøðsson, and Óláfr Guðrøðsson. During the same period, he has been accorded various epithets in English secondary sources: Amhlaíbh Dubh mac Gofhraidh, Amlaíb Dub, Olaf "the Black", Olaf Dubh, Olaf the Black, Óláfr Dubh, Óláfr the Black, and Olav the Black.) He was a son of Guðrøðr Óláfsson, King of the Isles and Fionnghuala Nic Lochlainn. Óláfr was a younger son of his father; Óláfr's elder brother, Rǫgnvaldr, probably had a different mother. According to the Chronicle of Mann, Guðrøðr appointed Óláfr as heir since he had been born "in lawful wedlock". Whether or not this is the case, after Guðrøðr's death in 1187 the Islesmen instead appointed Rǫgnvaldr as king, as he was a capable adult and Óláfr was a mere child. Rǫgnvaldr ruled the island-kingdom for almost forty years, during which time the half-brothers vied for the kingship.

Óláfr appears to have held authority on the island of Lewis and Harris. At some point, Óláfr appears to have confronted Rǫgnvaldr for a larger stake in the kingdom, after which Rǫgnvaldr had him seized and imprisoned by William the Lion, King of Scotland. Upon his release in 1214/1215, Óláfr is stated to have undertaken a pilgrimage to Santiago de Compostela, after which the half-brothers were reconciled, and Rǫgnvaldr had Óláfr married to Lauon, the sister of his own wife. In what appears to have been a politically motivated maneuver, Óláfr had his marriage declared null by Reginald, Bishop of the Isles, and proceeded to marry Cairistíona, a daughter of Fearchar, Earl of Ross. Whilst Lauon appears to have been a member of Clann Somhairle, a kindred led by Ruaidhrí mac Raghnaill, a man closely aligned with Rǫgnvaldr and opposed to the Scottish Crown, Cairistíona was the daughter of a rising Scottish magnate.

In 1223, Óláfr's marital actions are stated to have precipitated Rǫgnvaldr's son, Guðrøðr Dond, to attack Óláfr on Lewis and Harris, driving him into Ross to the safety of his father-in-law. Together with Páll Bálkason, Óláfr later defeated Guðrøðr Dond on Skye. The following year, Óláfr confronted Rǫgnvaldr on Mann, and the two partitioned of the kingdom between themselves. One of Rǫgnvaldr's allied against Óláfr was Alan fitz Roland, Lord of Galloway, who is recorded to have campaigned in the Isles against Óláfr. There is reason to suspect that Óláfr was conversely aligned with Alan's opponent in Ireland, Hugh de Lacy, Earl of Ulster. In 1226, Rǫgnvaldr and Alan orchestrated the marriage of a daughter of Rǫgnvaldr to Alan's bastard son, Thomas, a union that led the Islesmen to depose Rǫgnvaldr in favour of Óláfr. In 1229, Rǫgnvaldr invaded Mann, and was killed in battle against Óláfr.

In 1230, Óláfr was forced from his kingdom to Norway by Alan and members of Clann Somhairle. In response to this latest bout of warfare in the Isles, Hákon Hákonarson, King of Norway decided to send a royal fleet into the Isles, under the command of Óspakr, an apparent member of Clann Somhairle. When Óspakr was slain early in the campaign, Óláfr took control of the fleet and secured himself on Mann. At this point, the kingdom appears to have been partitioned between him and Guðrøðr Dond, with the latter ruling the Hebridean portion and Óláfr ruling Mann itself. In 1231, after the Norwegian fleet left Isles, Guðrøðr Dond was slain, and Óláfr ruled the whole Kingdom of the Isles peacefully, until his death in 1237. Óláfr's restoration was seen as a success by the Norwegians, and likely favourably viewed by the Scots as well. Óláfr was succeeded by his son, Haraldr. In all, three of Óláfr's sons ruled the Crovan dynasty's island-kingdom—the last of which, Magnús, was also the last of the dynasty to rule.

== Uncertain inheritance ==
Óláfr was a member of the Crovan dynasty, and a son of Guðrøðr Óláfsson, King of Dublin and the Isles. Óláfr's mother was Fionnghuala Nic Lochlainn. Guðrøðr had several other children: Affrica, Rǫgnvaldr, and Ívarr. Other possible children include Ruaidhrí, and a daughter whose name is unknown. According to the thirteenth-century Chronicle of Mann, Óláfr's mother was Fionnghuala Nic Lochlainn, granddaughter of Muirchertach Mac Lochlainn, High King of Ireland. She was probably a daughter of Muirchertach's son, Niall Mac Lochlainn, King of Cineál Eoghain. Although Óláfr's parentage is known, the maternal ancestry of Rǫgnvaldr is less certain. She may have been Sadbh, an Irishwoman identified as his mother by a contemporary Gaelic praise poem. (Note: The maternal ancestry of Affrica and Ívarr, specifically identified as children of Guðrøðr, are likewise unknown.) The likelihood that Rǫgnvaldr and Óláfr had different mothers may well explain the intense conflict between the two men in the years that followed.

The chronicle reveals that the marriage between Guðrøðr and Fionnghuala was formalised in 1176/1177, under the auspices of a visiting papal legate. Before Guðrøðr's death in 1187, the chronicle claims that he left instructions for Óláfr to succeed to the kingship since the latter had been born "in lawful wedlock". This statement could indicate that Óláfr was born just before or immediately after his parents' marriage. The chronicle certainly states that Óláfr was born before the legate formalised his parents' marriage, suggesting that the union existed for some time prior. This source, however, gives conflicting dates for Óláfr's birth: 1173 and 1177. Specifically, in its account of his parents marriage, the chronicle states that Óláfr was three years old; and in its account of his father's death, Óláfr is said to have been only ten.

If the chronicle's account of Óláfr's stake in the kingship is to be believed, it could indicate that Guðrøðr attempted to legitimise the royal succession through his canonical marriage to Fionnghuala. However, this source appears to date to the reign of Óláfr's son, Magnús, and there is reason to suspect that it source was compiled in the context of an attempt to legitimise Óláfr's branch of the Crovan dynasty over that of Rǫgnvaldr. As such, the chronicle appears to be biased towards Óláfr's line, and its account of Guðrøðr's succession may not objective. Whether the chronicle is accurate in its account of the succession is uncertain, as the Islesmen are stated to have chosen Rǫgnvaldr to rule instead, because unlike Óláfr, who was only a child at the time, Rǫgnvaldr was a hardy young man fully capable to reign as king. Furthermore, the fact that Rǫgnvaldr appears to have held power in the Hebrides at the time of Guðrøðr's death could indicate that it was Rǫgnvaldr who had been the acknowledged heir. Another possibility, suggested by the chronicle and latter correspondence between Óláfr and the English Crown, is that Rǫgnvaldr's tenure had been originally intended as temporary wardship until Óláfr was able to reign himself. (Note: In this letter from Óláfr to Henry III, King of England, Óláfr describes Rǫgnvaldr as a bastard, but does not further elaborate on the identity of his mother.)

== Hebridean magnate ==
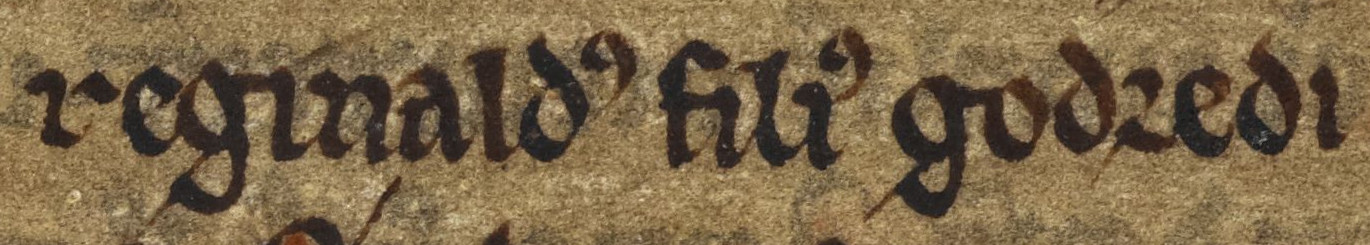
The name of Óláfr's older half-brother, Rǫgnvaldr Guðrøðarson, as it appears on folio 40v of British Library Cotton Julius A VII: "Reginaldus filjus Godredi".

Rǫgnvaldr succeeded Guðrøðr as king in 1188. At some point after assuming control of the kingdom, the chronicle reports that Rǫgnvaldr gave Óláfr possession of a certain island called "Lodhus". The chronicle disparagingly describes the island as being mountainous and rocky, completely unsuitable for cultivation, and declares that its small population lived mostly by hunting and fishing. Although Lodhus is an early Latin form of the place name of Lewis—the rather flat and boggy northerly half of the Outer Hebridean island of Lewis and Harris—the chronicle's text seems to instead refer to Harris—the somewhat mountainous southerly half. The chronicle claims that, because of the impoverishment of his lands, Óláfr was unable to support himself and his followers, and that in consequence he led "a poor sort of life". There is reason to suspect that the chronicle's otherwise perceptible prejudice against Rǫgnvaldr's branch of the Crovan dynasty, and its apparent bias in favour of Mann over the northernmost reaches of the realm, may also account for its denigrating depiction of Óláfr's allotted lands.

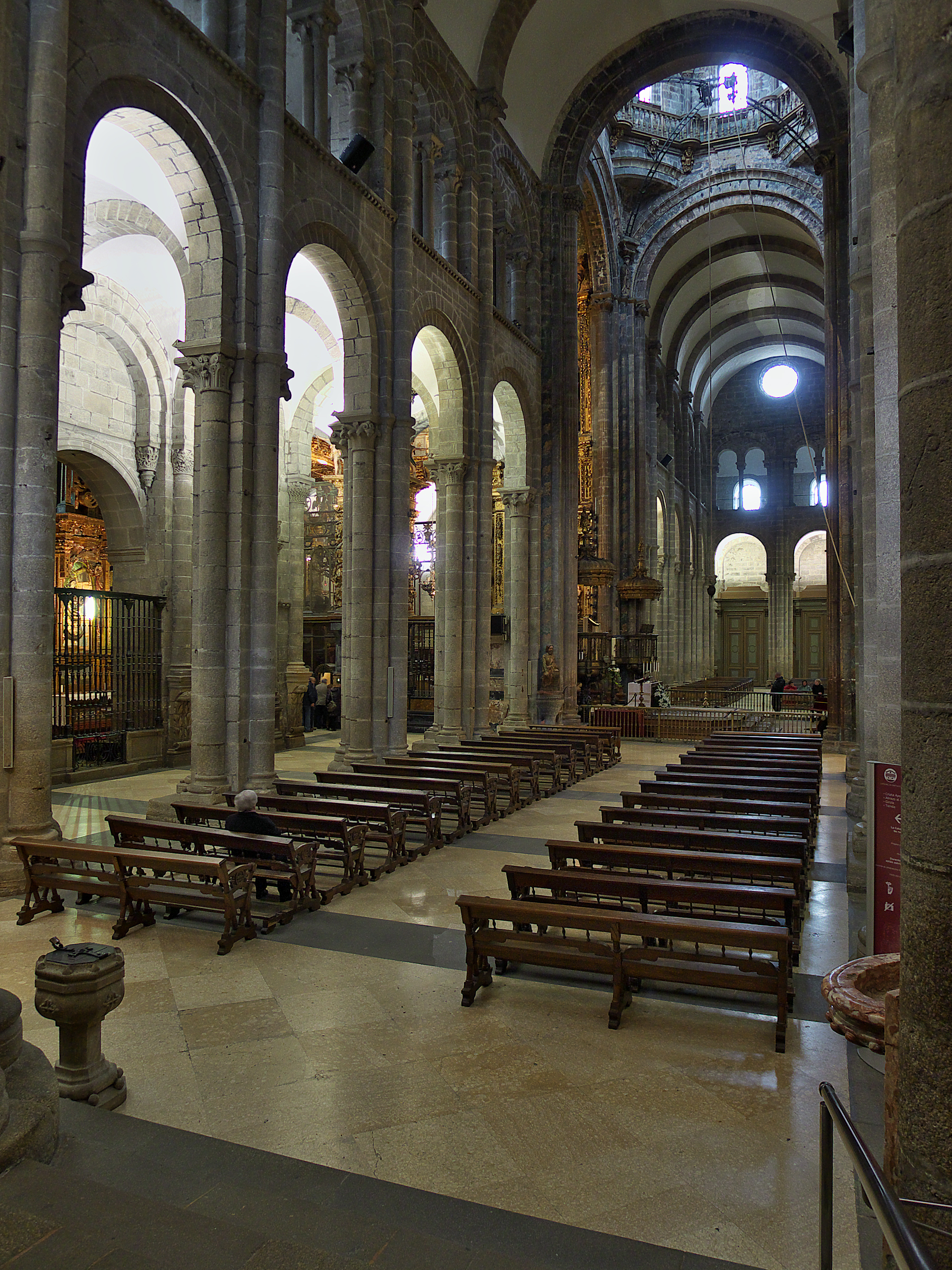
The mediaeval barrel-vaulted nave of the Cathedral of Santiago de Compostela. For over a thousand years the cathedral has been the destination of pilgrims making their way to Santiago de Compostela.

In consequence of this supposed poverty, the chronicle claims that Óláfr went to Rǫgnvaldr, who was also living in the Hebrides, and confronted him for more land. Rǫgnvaldr's stated response was to have Óláfr seized and sent to William I, King of Scotland, who kept him imprisoned for almost seven years. It is possible that, at this stage of his career, Óláfr acted as an under-king to Rǫgnvaldr, and sought to increase his share of power. There is reason to suspect that, following Óláfr's inability to make a deal with Rǫgnvaldr, Óláfr approached Ingi Bárðarson, King of Norway, and offered himself as a more palatable vassal-king in return for Norwegian support in deposing Rǫgnvaldr. In 1210, Rǫgnvaldr himself appears to have travelled to Norway, as evinced by a version of the thirteenth-century Bǫglunga sǫgur, in a journey that could well have been an attempt to further cement his position in the Isles, and counter Óláfr's claims to the throne, by formally submitting to the Norwegian king. In any case, the chronicle states that William died during the seventh year of Óláfr's captivity, and that William had ordered the release of all his political prisoners before his passing. Since William died in December 1214, Óláfr's incarceration appears to have spanned between about 1207/1208 and 1214/1215. Upon his release, the chronicle reveals that the half-brothers met on Mann, after which Óláfr set off on a pilgrimage with his followers to Santiago de Compostela.

Óláfr's time in the Isles is confirmed by several Icelandic sources—the sagas of Hrafn Sveinbjarnarson (an Icelandic chieftain) and Guðmundr Arason (an Icelandic ecclesiast)—which recount how, in 1202, Guðmundr attempted to sail from Iceland to Norway to become consecrated as the Bishop of Hólar. For example, the thirteenth-century Hrafns saga Sveinbjarnarsonar relates that the wayfaring Icelanders encountered a severe storm and were blown far off course before being forced to make landfall in the Hebrides. The saga identifies the island they landed upon as Sandey, which may well refer to Sanday, a tiny tidal island linked to its larger neighbour Canna, the westernmost island of the Small Isles. The sandy flat that joins the islands together forms one of the best natural harbours in the Hebrides.

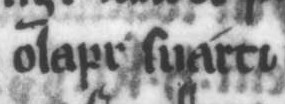
Óláfr's name as appears on folio 163r of AM 47 fol (Eirspennill): "Olafr suárti". The Old Norse epithet svarti refers to the colour "black". (Note: Evidence of a Gaelic epithet accorded to Óláfr is preserved by a thirteenth-century English administrative record which identifies one of his sons as "Magnus filius Olavi Duf". This Latin text corresponds to the Old Norse svarti accorded to Óláfr by the thirteenth-century Hákonar saga Hákonarsonar. Óláfr's epithet is further evidenced by the eighteenth-century Book of Clanranald which identifies him as "Amhlamh Dubh" in Gaelic. Whilst most of the names of the Crovan dynasty are Scandinavian in origin, suggesting that the family was self-consciously identified itself as Scandinavian, the fact that several members bore Gaelic epithets is evidence of the hybrid Scandinavian-Gaelic cultural milieu of the Isles.)

According to Hrafns saga Sveinbjarnarsonar, the Icelanders were met by an official of a local king named Óláfr who attempted to collect a landing-tax from them. Afterwards, whilst the Icelanders were at church, the king is said to have personally invited the bishop-elect to dine with him. Guðmundr is then said to have refused the king, after which the latter forbade them to leave. Although the Icelanders are reported to have taken up arms, they eventually caved to the king before being allowed to set sail for Norway. The king encountered by the Icelanders was probably Óláfr himself, although it is not certain that the Crovan dynasty controlled the Small Isles at this point in history. (Note: Although a son of Somhairle mac Giolla Brighde, King of the Isles is known to have borne the same name, nothing more is known of him. Canna certainly had several mediaeval churches on it. The fact that it is one of the islands noted by Iona Abbey's foundation charter could indicate that the landing rights of the island belonged to this Benedictine monastery and not a secular ruler. The monastery's foundation charter dates to the year after the Icelanders made landfall. If the island was associated with Iona before the monastery's foundation, it is possible that the Icelanders had anticipated the bishop-elect would have been treated well there. In any case, at some point, the Small Isles formed part of the Clann Ruaidrí lordship.) One possibility is that Óláfr, like the Icelanders, may have been temporarily stranded on the tidal island, and that he may have taken advantage of the storm-stricken churchmen to offset the poverty that is assigned to him by the chronicle. (Note: The episode of Hrafn and Guðmundr in the Hebrides may be evidence that the Kings of the Isles sought to capitalise upon their realm's place amidst the important maritime routes between Iceland, Norway, and the Irish Sea. International traffic through this region may be materially evinced by the Lewis chessmen, a collection of seventy-eight mediaevel gaming pieces, found in Lewis and probably crafted in Norway.)

== Marriage to Lauon ==
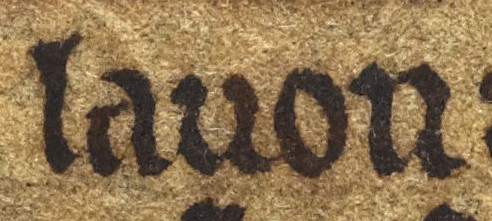
The name of Óláfr's wife, Lauon, as it appears on folio 42r of British Library Cotton Julius A VII: "Lauon". This woman could have been a close kinswoman of Ruaidhrí mac Raghnaill, perhaps a daughter. (Note: The name accorded to Lauon by the Chronical of Mann may represent a Gaelic name.)

Upon Óláfr's return from his pilgrimage, the chronicle records that Rǫgnvaldr had Óláfr marry "Lauon", the sister of his own wife. Rǫgnvaldr then granted Lodhus back to Óláfr, where the newly-weds proceeded to live until the arrival of Reginald, Bishop of the Isles. The chronicle claims that the bishop disapproved of the marriage on the grounds that Óláfr had formerly had a concubine who was a cousin of Lauon. A synod was then assembled, after which the marriage is stated to have been nullified.

Although the identity of the half-brother's father-in-law is uncertain, the chronicle describes him as a nobleman from Kintyre, which suggests that he was a member of Clann Somhairle, since sources concerning this kindred associate it with Kintyre more than any other region. As such, the father could have been either Raghnall mac Somhairle, or Raghnall's son, Ruaidhrí—both of whom appear to have been styled "Lord of Kintyre" in contemporary sources—or possibly even Raghnall's younger son, Domhnall. (Note: One reason why the chronicle fails to name the father-in-law of Rǫgnvaldr and Óláfr could be that the chronicle is biased against him. Another possibility is that the chronicler may have simply not known his name. Likewise, the fact that the chronicle fails to name Lauon's sister—a woman alleged to have played a significant role in the kin-strife between Rǫgnvaldr and Óláfr—could be evidence of a specific bias against her.)

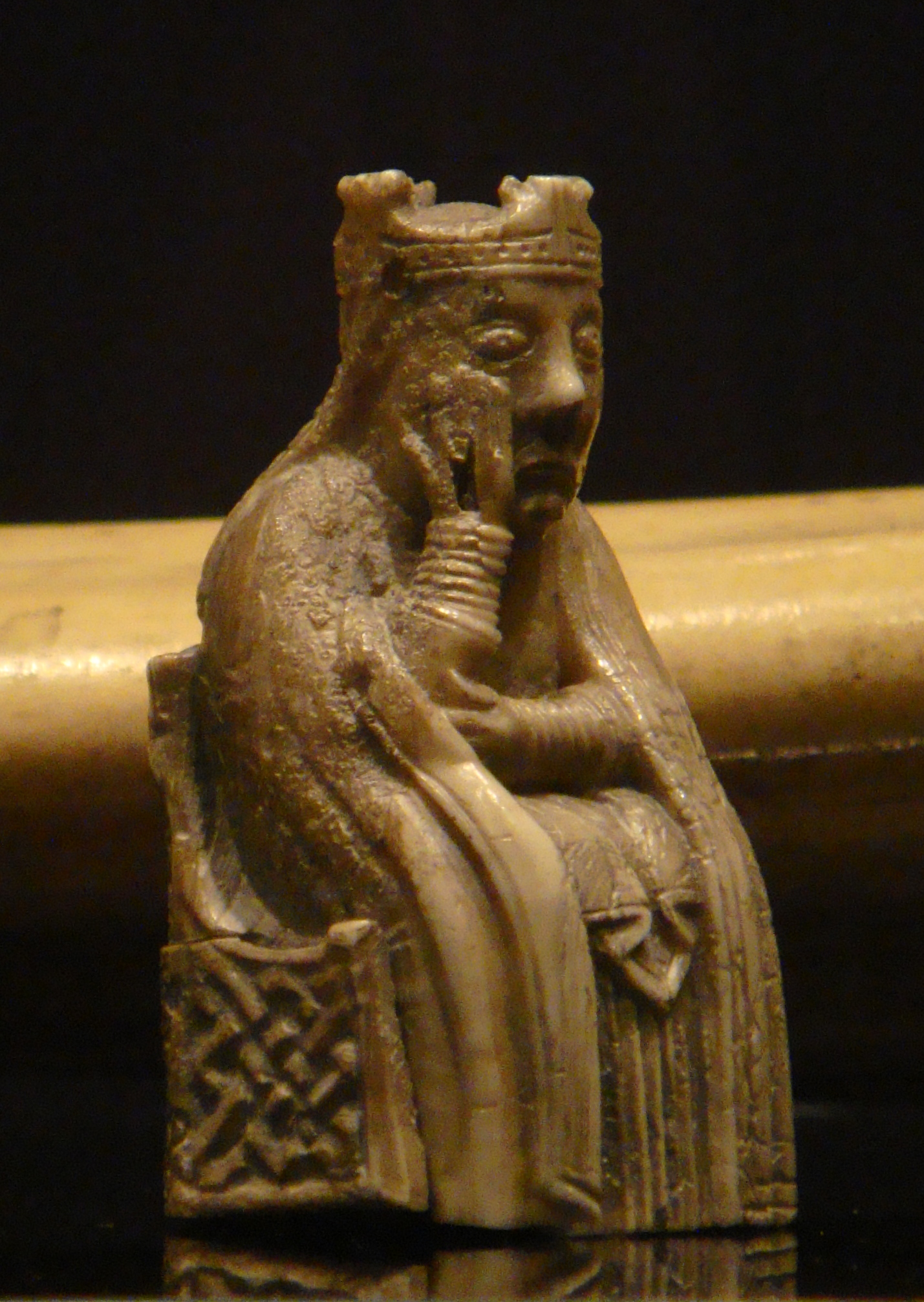
A queen gaming piece of the Lewis chessmen. Comprising some four sets, the pieces are thought to have been crafted in Norway in the twelfth- and thirteenth centuries. They were uncovered in Lewis in the early nineteenth century.

It is conceivable that Rǫgnvaldr's marriage was undertaken before 1210, perhaps not long after 1200 considering the fact that Guðrøðr Dond—a product of this union—was an adult by 1223 and had fathered at least one son by this date. Óláfr's marriage to Lauon may have taken place in 1216. The binding of Rǫgnvaldr and Óláfr to Clann Somhairle wives could well have been orchestrated in an effort to patch up relations between the Crovan dynasty and Clann Somhairle, neighbouring kindreds that had bitterly contested the kingship of the Isles for about sixty years.

After the death of Aonghus mac Somhairle in 1210, the leading dynast of Clann Somhairle appears to have been Ruaidhrí. It is possible that, as a result of the marriage alliance between his family and the Crovan dynasty, Ruaidhrí acknowledged Rǫgnvaldr's kingship, and thereby established himself as a leading magnate within a reunified Kingdom of the Isles. Since the majority of Ruaidhrí's territories appear to have been mainland possessions, it is very likely that the Scottish Crown regarded this alliance and apparent reunification of the Isles as a threat to its own claims of overlordship of Argyll. In fact, it is possible that the Scots' release of Óláfr in 1214 was intended to cause dynastic discord in the Isles. If this was indeed the case, the reconciliation between the half-brothers ensured that the Scottish Crown's machinations came to nought—at least temporarily.

== Marriage to Cairistíona ==
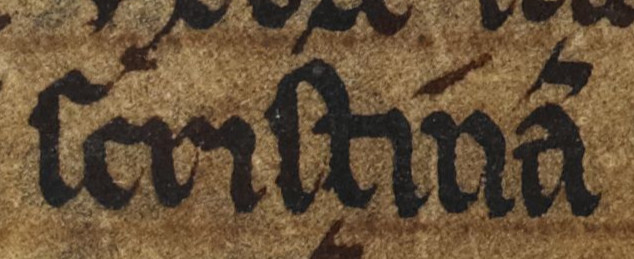
The name of Óláfr's wife, Cairistíona, as it appears on folio 42v of British Library Cotton Julius A VII: "Scristinam".

Once freed from his arranged marriage to Lauon, the chronicle reports that Óláfr proceeded to marry Cairistíona, daughter of Fearchar mac an tSagairt. The union appears to have taken place in about 1222/1223. The father of Cairistíona emerges from historical obscurity in 1215. Seemingly by the mid 1220s—at about the time of Cairistíona and Óláfr's marriage—Alexander II, King of Scotland rewarded Fearchar with the Earldom of Ross for meritorious service to the Scottish Crown. Although it is unknown if Fearchar received the earldom before his daughter's marriage, his comital elevation—or foreknowledge of it—could well have precipitated the match. (Note: By marrying his daughter to Óláfr, Fearchar established that he was able to deal with international powers, and proved that he was not reliant upon the Scottish Crown. The identification of Cairistíona's father by the chronicle outlined in events dating to 1222/1223, is the earliest reference to Fearchar designated an earl. It is possible that Fearchar's wife was Anglo-French or Flemish. His children bore a mixture of French and Gaelic names.)

There is certainly reason to suspect that the collapse of Óláfr's marriage to Lauon, and his subsequent marriage to Cairistíona, was a politically motivated maneuver. In 1221/1222, Alexander seems to have overseen a series of invasions into Argyll. This royal campaign appears to have resulted in a local regime change, with Ruaidhrí being replaced by Domhnall in Kintyre. One of several factors that could account for Ruaidhrí's expulsion is Scottish apprehension of a rejuvenated Kingdom of the Isles.

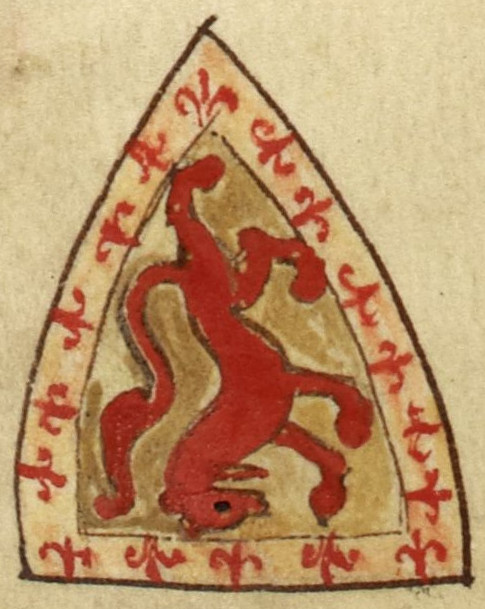
Coat of arms of Alexander II as it appears on folio 146v of British Library Royal 14 C VII (Historia Anglorum). The inverted shield represents the king's death in 1249.

Immediately after its account of Óláfr's marriage to Cairistíona, the chronicle details outright conflict between Óláfr and Rǫgnvaldr's family. The fact that this outbreak of violence is specifically dated to 1223 could indicate that it was Ruaidhrí's apparent downfall in Kintyre that led Óláfr to realign himself with Fearchar. By linking himself with Fearchar, Alexander's leading lieutenant in the north, it would appear that Óláfr recognised a regional shift in power, and therefore attempted to bind himself to a rising star in Scotland, and extract himself from any liability connected to Lauon's kin. Another apparent aftereffect of the Scots' invasion of Kintyre was the creation of the Clann Dubhghaill Lordship of Argyll, first evinced in 1225. If members of the Clann Dubhghaill branch of Clann Somhairle indeed began operating as agents of the Scottish Crown at about this time, it is possible that Óláfr—as a rival to the ruler of a reformed Kingdom of the Isles—acted as an agent of Scottish interests as well. As such, Óláfr's marriage to Cairistíona may have ultimately stemmed from a Scottish desire to destabilise the Isles. If Lauon's father was indeed Ruaidhrí, it is possible that Óláfr compensated the latter for his marriage by granting him lands or protection in the Isles. It is also possible that Ruaidhrí's descendants—Clann Ruaidhrí—owed their later power in Garmoran and the Hebrides to Óláfr's patronage.

Although the chronicle alleges that the union between Lauon and Óláfr was doomed for being within a prohibited degree of kinship, this is unlikely to have been the real reason for its dissolution. The impetus behind Reginald's part in the whole affair was probably more political than religious. The chronicle certainly depicts Reginald and Óláfr as close by describing the former as the son of a sister of Óláfr, and by relating that Reginald warmly greeted him when he arrived on Lodhus and orchestrated Óláfr's annulment. (Note: The chronicle further describes Reginald to have been of royal birth.) There is also reason to suspect that, in the years immediately after the death of a previous Bishop of the Isles in 1217, during a period in which Reginald vied with Nicholas de Meaux for this vacant office, Óláfr actively backed the candidacy of Reginald whereas Rǫgnvaldr backed that of Nicholas. (Note: Nicholas, a man who was also the Abbot of Furness, had been elected by the monks of Furness Abbey to be Bishop of the Isles, and received confirmation of this election from the monks of Rushen Abbey. Nevertheless, Nicholas never occupied his see, and appears to have spent some of his exile in Rome. A papal letter, dated November 1219, urges the Bishop of Carlisle and the papal legate to admonish an unnamed prince of the Isles and others opposed to a certain "N", Bishop of the Isles. Another papal letter, dated May 1224, states that "N" was exiled from his see because "the lord of the land and others being altogether opposed to him". The fact that Rǫgnvaldr became a vassal of the papacy in September 1219, and was specifically identified by the pope and described in glowing terms by him in a letter dated May 1223, suggests that it was Óláfr who opposed Nicholas. The fact that Henry warned Óláfr not to harm the monks of Furness, in a letter dated 1227, could indicate that Óláfr indeed had an agenda against Furness Abbey.)

== Conflict with Guðrøðr Dond ==
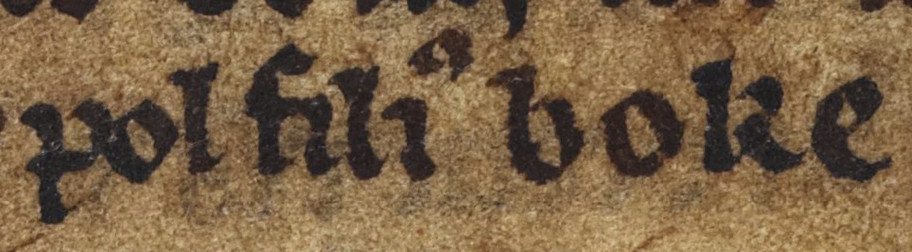
The name of Páll Bálkason as it appears on folio 42v of British Library Cotton Julius A VII: "Pol filius Boke".

If the chronicle is to be believed, Óláfr's separation from Lauon enraged her sister—the wife of Rǫgnvaldr and mother of Guðrøðr Dond—who surreptitiously tricked Guðrøðr Dond into attacking Óláfr in 1223. Following what he thought were his father's orders, Guðrøðr Dond gathered a force on Skye—where he was evidently based—and proceeded to Lodhus, where he is reported to have laid waste to most of the island. Óláfr is said to have only narrowly escaped with a few men, and to have fled to the protection of his father-in-law on the mainland in Ross. Óláfr is stated to have been followed into exile by Páll Bálkason, a vicecomes on Skye who refused to take up arms against him. At a later date, Óláfr and Páll are reported to have returned to Skye and defeated Guðrøðr Dond in battle. (Note: The chronicle describes Páll as a vicecomes. This Latin term has been translated into English as "sheriff", but may represent a Scandinavian title. It is possible that the term vicecomes is utilised as a result of English and Scottish influences in the Isles. In any case, the chronicle's account of Páll reveals that he was an important figure in the Isles—describing him as a "vigorous and powerful man throughout the kingdom"—and appears to indicate that he acted as a royal representative on Skye. It is possible that his family occupied the office of vicecomes in earlier generations. Páll's paternal grandfather may be identical to a like-named Hebridean chieftain stated by the chronicle to have assisted Guðrøðr Óláfsson against Somhairle mac Giolla Brighde in the 1150s.)

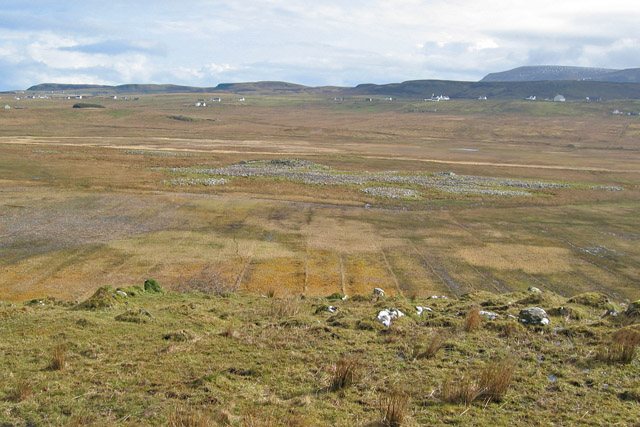
Eilean Chaluim Chille, Kilmuir, Skye. This meadow was once a loch, and may have been the site where Óláfr defeated Guðrøðr Dond.

The chronicle specifies that Guðrøðr Dond was overcome on "a certain island called the isle of St Columba". This location may be identical to Skeabost Island in the mouth of the river Snizort (NG41824850). Another possibility is that the isle in question is the now-landlocked island of Eilean Chaluim Chille in the Kilmuir district (NG37706879). This island once sat in Loch Chaluim Chille before the loch was drained of water and turned into a meadow. There is archaeological evidence to suggest that a fortified site sat on another island in the loch, and that this islet was connected to the monastic island by a causeway. If correct, the fortification could account for Guðrøðr Dond's presence near an ecclesiastical site. According to the chronicle, Óláfr's forces consisted of five boats, and encircled the island after having launched from the opposite shore two stadia from it. This distance, about 2 furlongs (400 metres), suggests that the island is more likely Eilean Chaluim Chille than Skeabost Island, as the former appears to have sat between 285 metres (935 feet) and 450 metres (1,480 feet) from the surrounding shores of Loch Chaluim Chille. (Note: The fact that, according to local tradition in Kilmuir, Páll or his father appears to be traditionally associated with the district—and called in Gaelic Fear Caisteal Eilein Chaluim Chille ("the man of the castle of Eilean Chaluim Chille")—may confirm that Loch Chaluim Chille was indeed the site of Guðrøðr Dond's stand against Óláfr and Páll. Kilmuir is also the site of Blar a' Bhuailte ("the field of the stricken"), where Vikings are traditionally said to have made a last stand in battle on Skye. Whilst the name of the island could suggest that the chronicle refers to Iona, the most famous island associated with St Columba, the context of passage reveals that the events took place on Skye.) In any case, following the clash, the chronicle reports that Guðrøðr Dond's captured followers were put to death, and Guðrøðr Dond was blinded and castrated. It is possible that Óláfr was aided by Fearchar in the strike against Guðrøðr Dond. Certainly, the chronicle's account seems to suggest that Óláfr accumulated his forces whilst sheltering in Ross. Although the chronicle maintains that Óláfr was unable to prevent this torture, and specifically identifies Páll as the instigator of the act, the Icelandic annals record that Óláfr was indeed responsible for his nephew's plight, and make no mention of Páll. (Note: Guðrøðr Dond's defeat to Óláfr and Páll is also noted—albeit in an extremely garbled form—by the seventeenth-century Sleat History. In the sentence immediately after the account of Guðrøðr Dond's blinding, this source declares that "Olay, surnamed the Red, killed MacNicoll in North Uist". Whilst it is possible that this statement refers to Óláfr's like-named paternal grandfather, and is therefore part of a passage that refers to a campaign conducted during the reign of this man, another possibility is that the sentence actually refers to Óláfr, and to an event that took place during his own reign.)

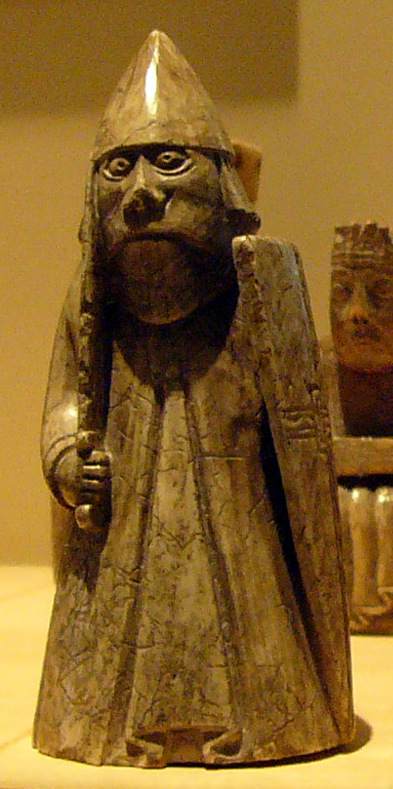
A rook gaming piece of the Lewis chessmen. The Scandinavian connections of leading members of the Isles may have been reflected in their military armament, and could have resembled that depicted upon such gaming pieces.

The mutilation and killing of high-status kinsmen during power-struggles was not an unknown phenomenon in the peripheral-regions of the British Isles during the High Middle Ages. (Note: According to the twelfth-century Descriptio Kambriæ, in an English account of succession disputes among the Welsh, "the most frightful disturbances occur in their territories as a result, people being murdered, brothers killing each other and even putting each other's eyes out, for as everyone knows from experience it is very difficult to settle disputes of this sort".) For instance, in only the century-and-a-half of its existence, at least nine members of the Crovan dynasty perished from mutilation or assassination. As such, there is reason to regard this vicious internecine violence as the Crovan dynasty's greatest weakness. To contemporaries, the tortures of blinding and emasculation were a means of depriving power from a political opponent. Not only would the punishment deny a man the ability to sire descendants, it would divest him of personal power, limiting his ability to attract supporters, and further offset the threat of future vengeance. The maiming inflicted upon Guðrøðr Dond seems to exemplify Óláfr's intent to wrest his perceived birthright from Rǫgnvaldr's bloodline. It is unknown why Rǫgnvaldr did not similarly neutralise Óláfr when he had the chance years before, although it may have had something to do with the preservation of international relations. For example, it is possible that his act of showing leniency to Óláfr had garnered Scottish support against the threat of Norwegian overlordship. In any case, the neutralisation of Guðrøðr Dond appears to mark a turning point in the struggle between Óláfr and Rǫgnvaldr.

In September 1219, Rǫgnvaldr surrendered Mann to the papacy, swore to perform homage for the island, and promised to pay twelve marks sterling in perpetuity as tribute. This submission was recognised by Pope Honorius III in May 1223. The precise impetus behind Rǫgnvaldr's submission is uncertain, although it may well have been related to the threat of ever-strengthening Norwegian kingship. Rǫgnvaldr's papal submission may have also been linked to his feud with Óláfr. For example, in the last hours of his life, John, King of England appealed to Pope Innocent III to ensure the succession of his young son, the future Henry III, King of England. Although the chronology of dissension between Rǫgnvaldr and Óláfr is not entirely clear, the hostilities which entangled Rǫgnvaldr's son broke out in the 1220s. Rǫgnvaldr, therefore, may have intended to secure, not only his own kingship, but also the future succession of his son.

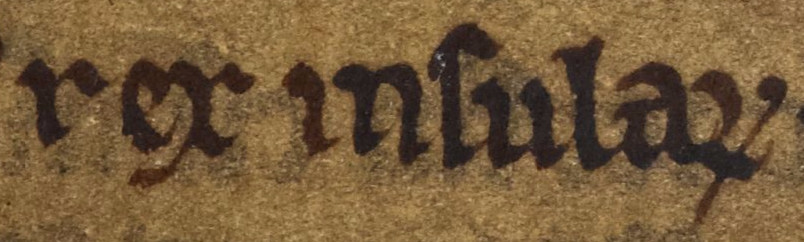
The title of Óláfr's father, Guðrøðr Óláfsson, as it appears on folio 40r British Library Cotton Julius A VII: "rex insularum" ("King of the Isles"). Although Óláfr, and his father and grandfather, styled themselves with this title, Óláfr's sons Haraldr and Magnús used the form rex mannie et insularum.

The kin-strife endured by the Crovan dynasty largely took place on Skye and Lodhus, islands that were clearly important within the kingdom. In fact, there is evidence to suggest that the kingdom's northern territories were granted by reigning kings to heir-apparents or disaffected dynasts. For example, during the eleventh-century reign of the dynasty's founder, Guðrøðr Crovan, the northern portion of the realm may have been governed by Guðrøðr Crovan's succeeding son, Lǫgmaðr. The fact that Rǫgnvaldr was residing in the Hebrides when his father died in 1187 may indicate that, despite the chronicle's claims to the contrary, Rǫgnvaldr was indeed the rightful heir to the kingship. Furthermore, since Guðrøðr Dond is recorded on Skye, the possibility exists that he resided there as his father's heir-apparent. Rǫgnvaldr's grant of Lodhus to Óláfr may, therefore, indicate that Óláfr was at least temporarily regarded as Rǫgnvaldr's rightful successor. On the other hand, it is also possible that Rǫgnvaldr's grant was given in the context of appeasing a disgruntled dynast passed over for the kingship. In any event, it is apparent that such territorial fragmentation would have severely weakened the realm.

== Opposition from Alan fitz Roland ==
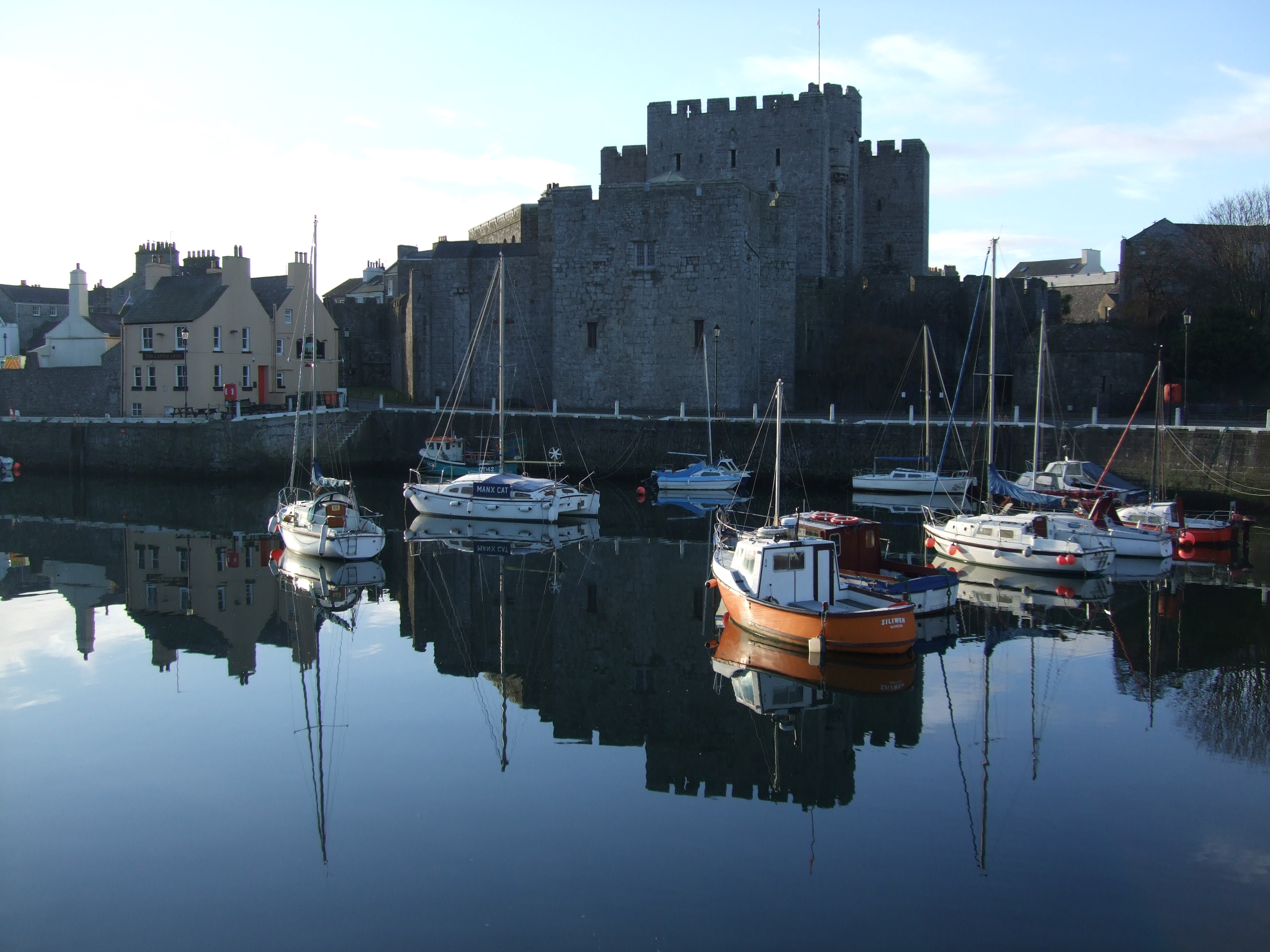
Castle Rushen is first recorded in the thirteenth century. It may have been constructed by Rǫgnvaldr Guðrøðarson, and could well have acted as his power centre when Óláfr confronted him at Ronaldsway in 1224.

In 1224, the year following the defeat of Rǫgnvaldr's son, the chronicle reveals that Óláfr took hostages from the leading men of the Hebridean portion of the realm, and with a fleet of thirty-two ships, landed on Mann at Ronaldsway, where he confronted Rǫgnvaldr directly. It was then agreed that the kingdom would be split between the two: with Rǫgnvaldr keeping Mann itself along with the title of king, and Óláfr retaining a share in the Hebrides. With Óláfr's rise at Rǫgnvaldr expense, the latter turned to Alan, one of Scotland's most powerful magnates. Alan and Rǫgnvaldr were certainly closely connected. Both were great-grandsons of Fergus, Lord of Galloway; both had received Ulster lands from the English at about the same time; and it is possible that connections between the Isles and Galloway had led to Rǫgnvaldr's involvement with the Scottish Crown in Caithness in about 1200.

In a letter from Alan to Henry, dated the year of the partitioning between the half-brothers, Alan mentioned that he was preoccupied with his army and fleet, travelling from island to island. This statement could well evince the beginning of joint military operations, conducted by Alan and Rǫgnvaldr against Óláfr, assigned by the chronicle to the following year. According to the latter source, however, the campaigning came to nought because the Manx were unwilling to battle against Óláfr and the Hebrideans. This record appears to show that Alan portrayed his actions in the Isles as related to his conflict with the Lacys in Ireland. As such, the correspondence could be evidence that the Ulster ambitions of Hugh de Lacy were aligned with Óláfr in the Isles. Not only did Óláfr clash with Rǫgnvaldr's son in 1223, but Hugh launched a bid to recover his forfeited Earldom of Ulster in the same year, a reclamation that seriously threatened recent Gallovidian expansion in Ireland. Whilst Rǫgnvaldr clearly had the support of Alan and his family, there is reason to suspect that Óláfr was allied to Hugh. In the correspondence between Alan and Henry, Alan stated that he had been on the verge of launching an invasion of Ireland when he learned of an agreement reached between Hugh and the Justiciar of Ireland, and therefore sought the king's confirmation of his family's lands in Ulster. Alan's letter appears to show that his campaigning in the Isles was understood to have been a detriment to Hugh in Ireland. As such, Hugh seems to have been expected to make use of military assistance from Isles in his restoration attempt. (Note: In 1210, the chronicle reports that John, King of England led five hundred ships to Ireland. Whilst Rǫgnvaldr and his men were absent from Mann, part of John's forces are recorded to have landed and ravaged the island for a fortnight before departing with hostages. There does not appear to be any other evidence of poor relations between Rǫgnvaldr and John at this time. Since the men were clearly on friendly terms between 1205 and 1207, John's assault on the island does not appear to be connected to Rǫgnvaldr's earlier campaigning with (the then-disgraced) John de Courcy. Instead, it is likely that the devastation was related to John's souring relations with the Lacy and the Briouze families. In 1208, William de Briouze, with his wife and family, fled from John to Ireland, where they were harboured by the Lacys. When John arrived in Ireland in 1210, the Briouzes fled towards Scotland, and were apprehended in Galloway by Donnchadh mac Giolla Brighde, Earl of Carrick, Courcy's close associate and Rǫgnvaldr's kinsman. Although it is impossible to know for certain whether Rǫgnvaldr sanctioned the arrival of the fleeing Briouzes, their close connection with the Lacys, and Rǫgnvaldr's close connection with Courcy—a man who had been forced from his Irish lands by the Lacys—both strongly suggest that cooperation between Rǫgnvaldr and Briouze is unlikely. In any case, the English depredations on Mann are corroborated by several sources. The English king's own account of events states that he learned of the capture of Briouze's wife and children whilst at Carrickfergus, a statement which may hint that the attack on Mann was punitive in nature. If the attack was indeed a case of retaliation it may not have been due to Rǫgnvaldr's own involvement with enemies of the English Crown. The fleeing Briouzes were also accompanied by Hugh himself, but unlike them he managed to elude capture, and was temporarily harboured in Scotland. The Lacys' previous connections with Dublin and Ulster suggest that Hugh may have had supporters on Mann. In fact, his stay-over in Rǫgnvaldr's absence may have been enabled due to the fraternal discord between Rǫgnvaldr and Óláfr. A correlation between the Lacys and the struggle between Óláfr and Rǫgnvaldr may be exemplified by a 1217 royal order directed at Hugh's half-brother, William Gorm de Lacy, commanding him to restore Carlingford Castle, and repay the damages which he had caused in capturing it. The fact that Rǫgnvaldr received restoration of his nearby knight's fee in 1219 could indicate that these lands had also been overrun and seized by the Lacys.) Óláfr's move against Rǫgnvaldr in 1223 and 1224—the very time the Lacys campaigned against Gallovidian interests in Ireland—is unlikely to have been a coincidence. It may have been the window of opportunity that Óláfr seized upon. Alternately, it may have been Hugh himself who capitalised upon the Gallovidian's campaigning against Óláfr. (Note: Prominent members of the Galloway family included the Lord of Galloway (Alan), the Earl of Atholl (Alan's brother, Thomas), and the Earl of Carrick (Donnchadh mac Giolla Brighde). All three possessed grants of lands in Ireland previously possessed by the Lacys. Hugh's rising dates as early as the summer of 1223, and concluded in October 1224. In the course of the campaign, Hugh enlisted the support of Aodh Méith Ó Néill, King of Tír Eoghain in an attack of Coleraine Castle, a possession of Alan's brother. Another castle targeted by Hugh was Carrickfergus Castle, a fortress that Hugh besieged with land and naval forces. Another historical record that may have bearing upon possible connections between Óláfr and the Lacys is the notice of the death of Diarmait Ó Conchobhair in 1221. According to the Annals of Loch Cé, Diarmait—a half-brother of Hugh's son, William Gorm—was slain by Alan's brother, Thomas, whilst Diarmait attempted to procure a Hebridean fleet to assist him in a bid for the kingship of Connacht.)

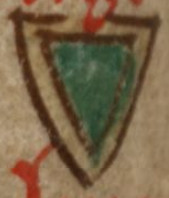
Coat of arms of Hugh de Lacy, as depicted on folio 161v of Cambridge Corpus Christi College 16 II (Chronica majora).

Other correspondence, possibly dating to about 1224, between Henry and his sister, Joan, Queen of Scotland, reveals that Hákon Hákonarson, King of Norway was rumoured to have been planning a naval expedition west-over-sea. Although Joan's letter to Henry places this campaign in the context of Hugh's threat to English-aligned interests in Ireland, it may be that Hákon's attention was focused upon the escalating situation in the Isles. One possibility is that Joan's letter is evidence that Óláfr was thought to have appealed to Hákon for support against Rǫgnvaldr. (Note: There is evidence indicating that the Norwegian and English Crowns pursued amiable relations at about the time of Joan's letter. In fact, in the winter of 1223/1224, Hákon himself sent a letter to his English counterpart in which he expressed his desire that the alliance between their kingdoms should continue. Joan's correspondence, on the other hand, dates to a low point of relations between Scotland and Norway, a fact that could explain why the Scottish rumour may have obscured the real object of Hákon's attention. In the autumn of 1223, according to the fifteenth-century Scotichronicon, Alexander hurried from the English royal court northwards to Moray. Although it is possible that he did so in the context of countering a revolt led by the Mhic Uilleim—insurgents he certainly faced later that decade—there is reason to suspect that this source has erroneously dated its account of the Mhic Uilleim uprising to 1223. If so, it may be more likely that Alexander was concerned with Fearchar that autumn, and the role that this magnate played in the kin-strife in the Isles, where his interference may have precipitated the outbreak of violence between Óláfr and Guðrøðr Dond.)

Also in 1224, the thirteenth-century Hákonar saga Hákonarsonar reports that a certain Gillikristr, Óttar Snækollsson, and many Islesmen, travelled to Norway and presented Hákon with letters pertaining to the needs of their lands. One possibility is that these so-called needs refer to the violent kin-strife and recent treaty between the half-brothers. The saga may therefore reveal that the Norwegian Crown was approached by either representatives of either side of the inter-dynastic conflict, or perhaps by neutral chieftains caught in the middle. (Note: Another possibility is that the visiting delegation was concerned with the threat of Scottish aggression in the Isles, following the Scottish Crown's conquest of Kintyre in 1221/1222. It is also conceivable that the delegation was concerned with the reports of the possible planned Norwegian intervention alluded to by the correspondence between Joan and Henry.) Further attempts to quell the infighting by way of the Norwegian Crown may have been undertaken in 1226, when it is remarked by the same source that Simon, Bishop of the Isles met with Hákon.

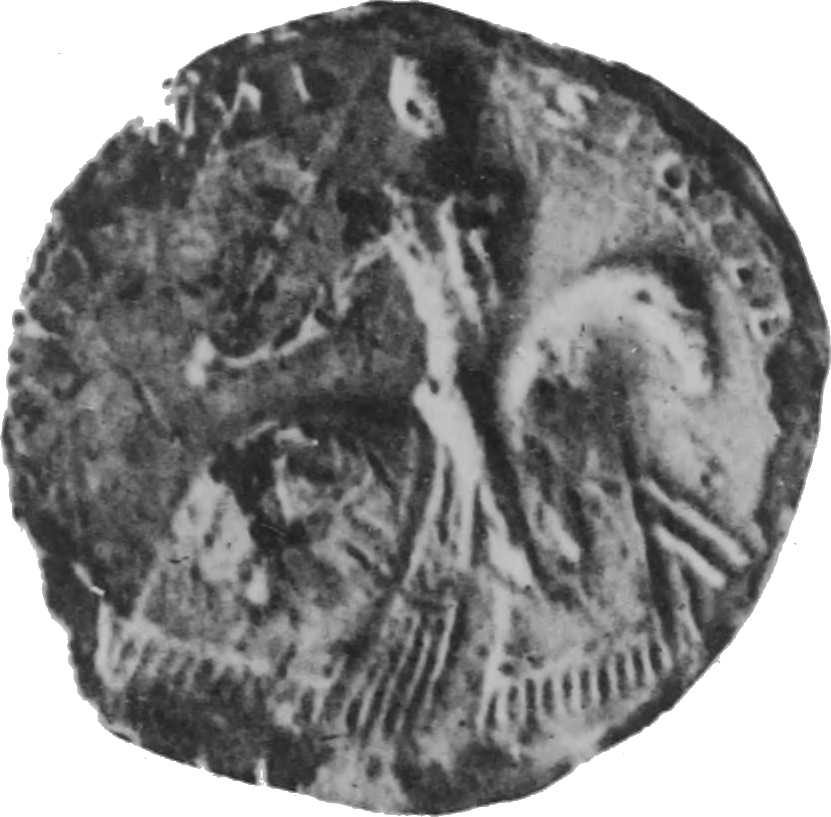
The seal of Alan fitz Roland, Rǫgnvaldr's ally against Óláfr. According to Hákonar saga Hákonarsonar, Alan was "the greatest warrior at that time. He had a great army and many ships. He plundered about the Hebrides for a long time".

A short time later, perhaps in about 1225 or 1226, the chronicle reveals that Rǫgnvaldr oversaw the marriage of a daughter of his to Alan's young illegitimate son, Thomas. Unfortunately for Rǫgnvaldr, this marital alliance appears to have cost him the kingship, since the chronicle records that the Manxmen had him removed from power and replaced with Óláfr. The recorded resentment of the union could indicate that Alan's son was intended to eventually succeed Rǫgnvaldr, who was perhaps about sixty years-old at the time, and whose grandchildren were presumably still very young. In fact it is possible that, in light of Rǫgnvaldr's advanced age and his son's mutilation, a significant number of the Islesmen regarded Óláfr as the rightful heir. Such a view could well account for the lack of enthusiasm that the Manxmen had for Alan and Rǫgnvaldr's campaign in the Hebrides. Since Thomas was likely little more than a teenager at the time, it may well have been obvious to contemporary observers that Alan was the one who would hold the real power in the kingdom.

The fact that Rǫgnvaldr agreed to the marriage could indicate that a stake in the kingship was the price of Alan's assistance against Óláfr. From the perspective of the Scottish Crown, it is conceivable that Alan's ambitions in the Isles were encouraged by the prospect of Alan's son becoming a dependable client-king on Mann, and the potential to further extend and strengthen Scottish royal authority along the western seaboard, bringing stability to the war-torn region. (Note: As for Alan—a man who faced the probability that Galloway would be partitioned between his legitimate daughters on his eventual death—the marital alliance may have been conducted as a means to ensure a power base for Thomas, whose illegitimacy threatened to exclude him from inheriting his father's domain under the feudal laws of the English and Scottish realms.) Alexander probably also encouraged Fearchar's alliance with Óláfr. As such, the Scottish Crown appears to have escalated the discord in the Isles by playing off both sides in the fraternal struggle. Whilst Alan's interest apparently consisted of Mann and the southern Hebrides, territories that would have complemented his lordships within the North Channel-Firth of Clyde region, Fearchar's own interest may have centred around Skye and Lewis, where his descendants gained dominance later in the thirteenth century. (Note: If Ruaidhrí and his family held power in Garmoran, and were regional opponents of Fearchar, it is conceivable that the marriage alliance between Óláfr and Fearchar was conceived by the latter as a means to counter Ruaidhrí.)

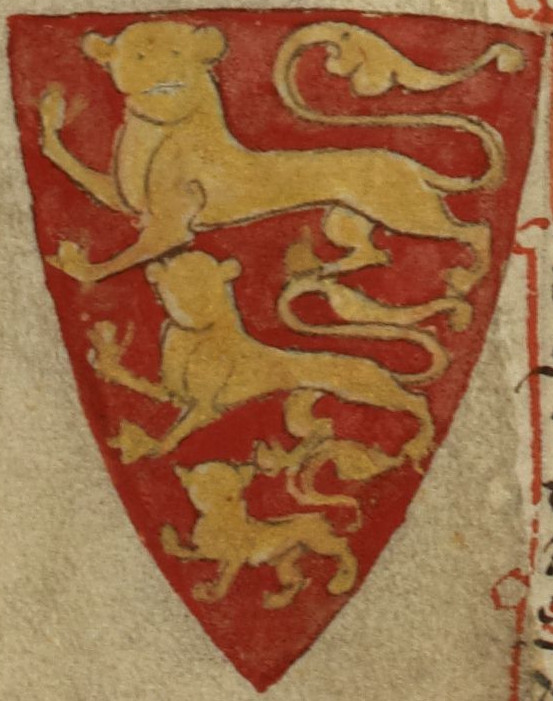
Coat of arms of Henry III as it appears on folio 100r of British Library Royal 14 C VII.

At this low point of his career, the deposed Rǫgnvaldr appears to have gone into exile at Alan's court in Galloway. In 1228, whilst Óláfr and his chieftains were absent in Hebrides, the chronicle records of an invasion of Mann by Rǫgnvaldr, Alan, and Alan's brother, Thomas. The attack appears to have resulted in the complete devastation of the southern half of the island, since the chronicle declares that it was almost reduced to a desert. Suffering serious setbacks at the hands of his enemies, in what appears to be the nadir of his career, Óláfr reached out for English assistance against his half-brother, as evidenced by fragments of correspondence between Henry and Óláfr in which the latter alluded to aggression dealt from Alan. This appeal for English assistance requests that Henry intervene with Alexander, and appears to show that Óláfr believed that Alexander was actively encouraging Alan's aggression. (Note: Óláfr further stated in his letter that he came to an agreement with the Justiciar of Ireland regarding "piracy", and asked Henry to instruct the justiciar to assist him.) The participation of the Earl of Atholl in the 1228 attack could indicate that Alexander was aware of the operation. One possibility is that, instead of an attempt to conquer the island, this Scottish-led operation was an attempt to pressure Óláfr into coming to terms without involving the English. In any case, after Alan vacated Mann, Óláfr and his forces reappeared on the island, and routed the remaining Gallovidians. Thus, the chronicle declares, peace was restored to the island.

Despite the warring against Óláfr, the English administration was certainly dealing with him as king by 1228. That year English records reveal that Henry attempted to broker a peace between the half-brothers, and gave Óláfr safe passage to England. This intervention may have led to Óláfr's temporary absence from Mann that year. It could also roughly mark the point when Rǫgnvaldr finally lost English support. Although the English Crown technically recognised Óláfr's kingship in correspondence sent to him the year before, the aggressive tone directed at him suggests that the preferred dynast may well have been Rǫgnvaldr at that point in time. (Note: It may be significant that Alan's brother, Thomas, is not recorded to have assailed Óláfr after the actions of 1228.)

== Rǫgnvaldr's final fall ==
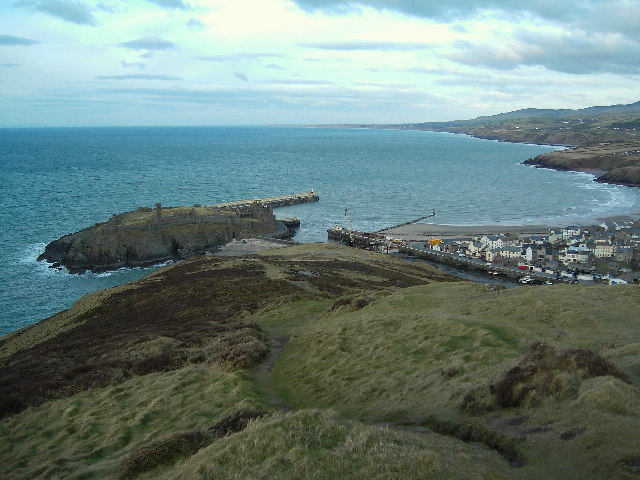
Whilst St Patrick's Isle appears to have been a Manx power centre of Óláfr, Rǫgnvaldr's power seems to have located to the south at Ronaldsway and Castle Rushen.

In what was likely early January 1229, the chronicle records that Rǫgnvaldr caught the forces of Óláfr unaware, as Rǫgnvaldr sailed from Galloway with five ships, and launched a nocturnal raid upon the harbour at St Patrick's Isle, near what is today the town of Peel. During this assault, the chronicle records that Rǫgnvaldr had all of the ships of Óláfr and his chieftains destroyed. Although the chronicle's description of the attack alludes to Gallovidian involvement, as it states that the expedition originated from Galloway, the fact that Rǫgnvaldr commanded only five ships suggests that this support may have been waning. (Note: This does not necessary indicate that Alan abandoned Rǫgnvaldr's cause, however, as Alan may well have been engaged in campaigning against the ongoing Mhic Uilleim insurrection against the Scottish Crown. Even if this was the case, Rǫgnvaldr may have also considered Alan's involvement a detriment at this stage.)

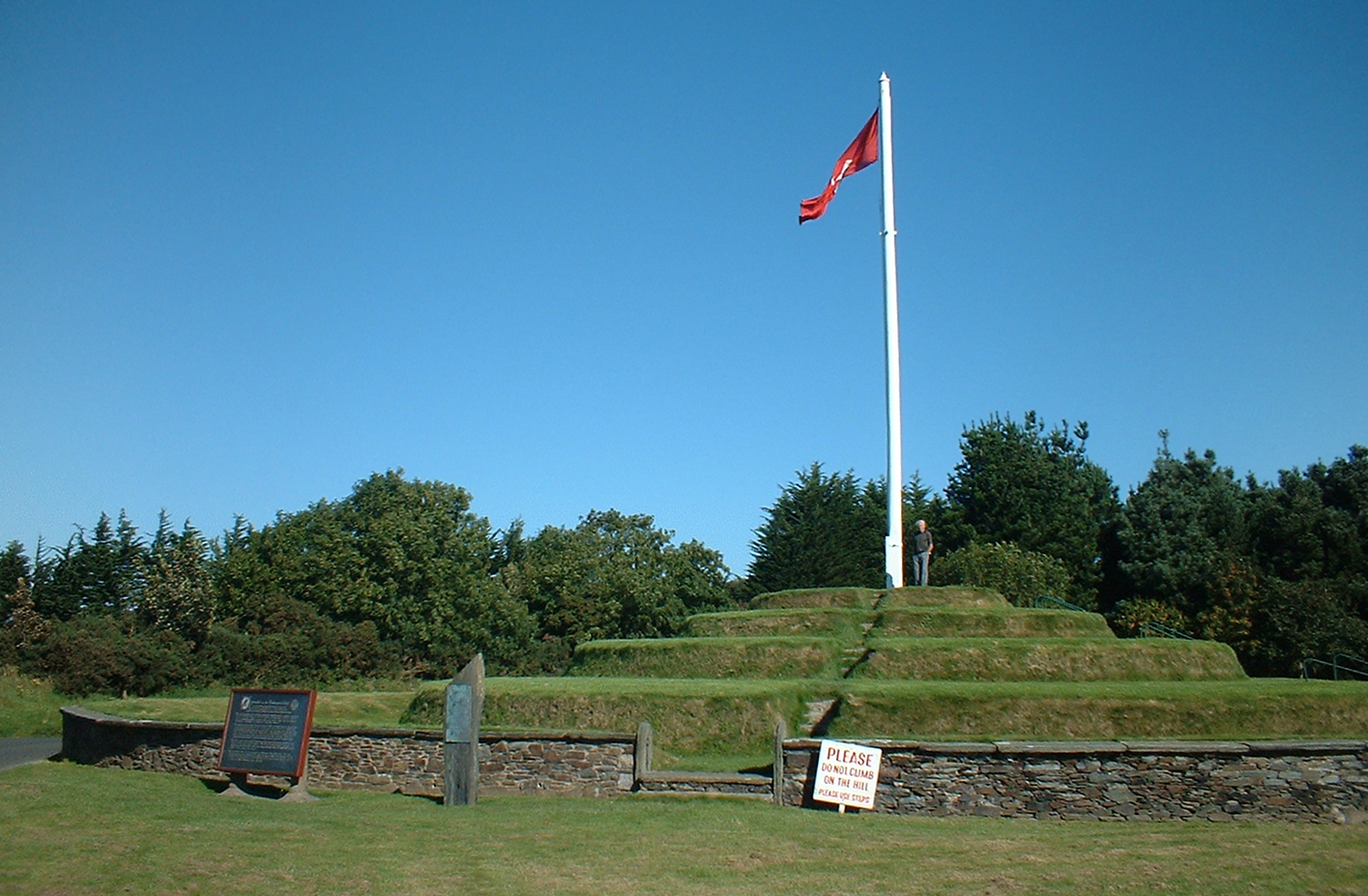
Tynwald Hill, near St John's may have been a national assembly site of the Kingdom of the Isles. Tynwald was the site of the final conflict between Óláfr and Rǫgnvaldr. If Óláfr was indeed his father's chosen successor, as the chronicle alleges, it is possible that Óláfr was established as such at Tynwald. It is possible that Óláfr was inaugurated here following the events of 1225/1226. (Note: Much of the visible site dates only to the eighteenth-, nineteenth-, and twentieth century.)

Rǫgnvaldr followed up on his assault by establishing himself in the southern part of Mann, as the chronicle records that he won over the support of the southerners. Meanwhile, Óláfr is stated to have assembled his forces in the north of Mann, indicating that the island was divided between the two men for much of January and February, before what would be their final confrontation. According to the chronicle, Rǫgnvaldr and Óláfr led their armies to Tynwald. (Note: The chronicle's account of this episode, and another dating to 1237, are the earliest records of Tynwald's place name. The first specific record of Tynwald as an assembly site dates to 1237. The account of Óláfr rallying support in the north of Mann, and of Rǫgnvaldr in the south, appears to correspond to the traditional north-south division of the island. Such a division of the island—into North Mann and South Mann—appears to borne out by archaeology, history, and toponymy.) The derivation of this place name—from the Old Norse elements þing ("assembly") and vǫllr ("field", "meadow")—reveals that it was an assembly site, which in turn suggests that negotiations may have been intended.

On 14 February, the festival of St Valentine, the chronicle records that Óláfr's forces launched an attack upon Rǫgnvaldr at Tynwald, where Rǫgnvaldr's troops were routed and he himself was slain. Tynwald may well have been the place where the Islesmen publicly inaugurated their kings, proclaimed new laws, and resolved disputes. As such, Óláfr's victory over Rǫgnvaldr at this site could have enhanced his royal status. Whilst Rǫgnvaldr's fall is laconically corroborated by the Icelandic annals, other sources appear to suggest that his death was due to treachery. The fourteenth-century Chronicle of Lanercost, for example, states that Rǫgnvaldr "fell a victim to the arms of the wicked"; whilst the Chronicle of Mann states that, although Óláfr grieved at his half-brother's death, he never exacted vengeance upon his killers. Although the latter's account of Guðrøðr Dond's maiming and Rǫgnvaldr's death could be evidence that Óláfr was unable to control his supporters during these historical episodes, it is also possible that the compilers of this source sought to disassociate Óláfr from these acts of violence against his kin.

== Norwegian intervention ==
=== Óspakr's appointed kingship ===
The name and title of Óspakr as it appears on folio of 174r of GKS 1005 fol: "Vspakr konungr" (Flateyarbók). Hákonar saga Hákonarsonar describes several sons and suspected sons of Dubhghall mac Somhairle (Dubhghall, Donnchadh, Óspakr, and Somhairle) as Hebridean kings.

The death of Alan's ally did not deter Gallovidian interests in the Isles. In fact, it is apparent that Alan and members of the Clann Dubhghaill branch of Clann Somhairle upheld pressure upon Óláfr. (Note: In 1229, the year of Rǫgnvaldr's demise, the Chronicle of Lanercost appears to show that Alan married Hugh's daughter, Rose. It is possible that Alan commenced this union in an effort to salvage something of his family's prospects in Ulster which had by then fallen under Hugh's overlordship. It may have also been an attempt by Alan to gain another ally to assist him in the Isles.) Reports of open warfare in the Isles reached Hákon's royal court in the summer of 1229. The thirteenth-century Hákonar saga Hákonarsonar specifically singles out Alan as one of the principal perpetrators of unrest, describing him as "the greatest warrior", possessing a large force of men and ships with which he plundered throughout the Hebrides. Several members of Clann Somhairle are also associated with this unrest: Dubhghall mac Dubhghaill, Donnchadh mac Dubhghaill, and a certain Somhairle. Whilst these members of Clann Somhairle are depicted as being disloyal to Hákon, the saga contrasts them with Óláfr, who is said to have been a steadfast supporter of Hákon, and to have manfully held his kingdom against Alan.

Although Óláfr arrived at the Norwegian court early in 1230, having been forced from the Isles by Alan and his allies, it is evident that Hákon had already decided upon a course of action. Upon his arrival, the saga relates that Óláfr gave a report of Alan's actions in the Isles. According to the Flateyjarbók and Skálholtsbók versions of the saga, Óláfr repeated a boast of Alan, suggesting that Alan thought himself capable of even invading Norway. Rather than being an accurate reflection of Alan's intentions, however, there is reason to suspect that Óláfr's recounted bluster was instead an invention designed to direct further Norwegian animosity at Alan.

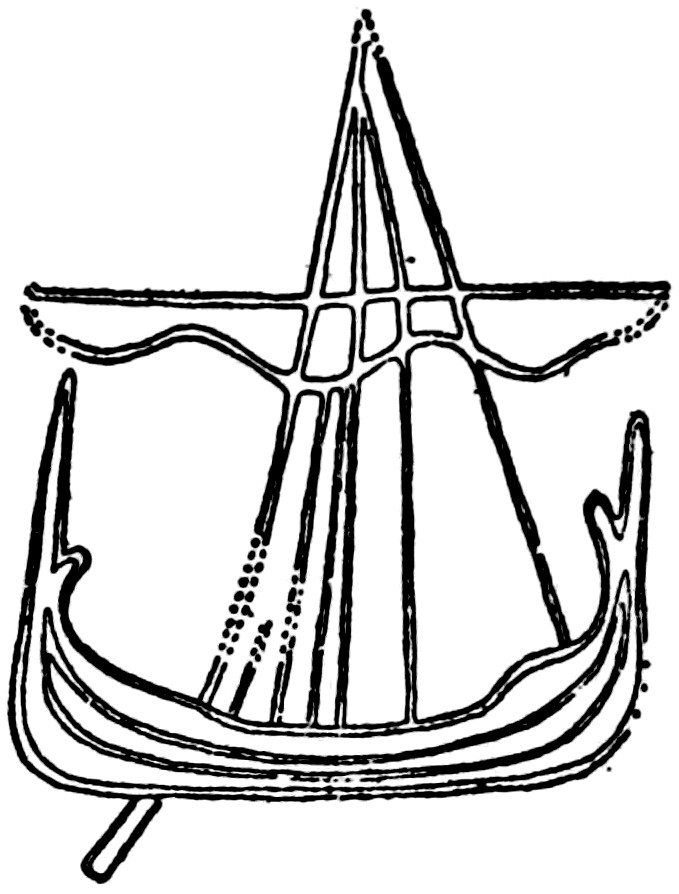
Detail from Maughold IV, a Manx runestone displaying a contemporary sailing vessel. The power of the kings of the Isles laid in their armed galley-fleets.

In any case, the Icelandic annals, saga, Chronicle of Mann, and Chronicle of Lanercost all reveal that Hákon handed over the kingship of the Isles to Óspakr, an apparent member of Clann Dubhghaill who had long served outside the Isles in Norway. Other Islesmen in Norway before Óláfr's arrival were Páll and Guðrøðr Dond, the latter who seems to have been one of Óspakr's principal supporters. According to saga, Hákon not only granted Óspakr the kingship, but also gave him command of the Norwegian fleet tasked with restoring peace in the Isles.

Within days of Óláfr's arrival in Norway, the saga reveals that Óspakr's fleet set sail for the Isles, and swelled in number after reaching Orkney. Whilst the Eirspennill version of the saga numbers the fleet in Norway at twelve ships, the Flateyjarbók, Frísbók, and Skálholtsbók versions give the number eleven; and whilst the former version relates that the fleet gained twenty ships from Orkney, the latter three versions state that the fleet numbered twenty when it left Orkney. The saga recounts that Óláfr and Páll journeyed on the same ship, and states that, after they reached Orkney, Jón Haraldsson, Earl of Orkney gave Óláfr a ship called the Ox. (Note: Hákonar saga Hákonarsonar exists in several mediaeval redactions. The most authoritative of these is the Eirspennill version. The statements regarding Óláfr and Páll journeying on the same ship, and Jón's gift to Óláfr, are not noted by the Frísbók version. Whilst the fleet was Orkney, the saga reports that a detachment of ships, led by Páll's son, Bálki, and a certain Óttarr Snækollr, journeyed to Skye where they fought and killed Þórkell Þórmóðarson, in what may have been the culmination of a family feud. If word of Óspakr's royal fleet had not reached Alan and the Scots at the time of its arrival at Orkney, news of it could well have been passed on from Fearchar when the Islesmen clashed at Skye.) Once in the Isles, the fleet linked up with three leading members of Clann Somhairle on Islay.

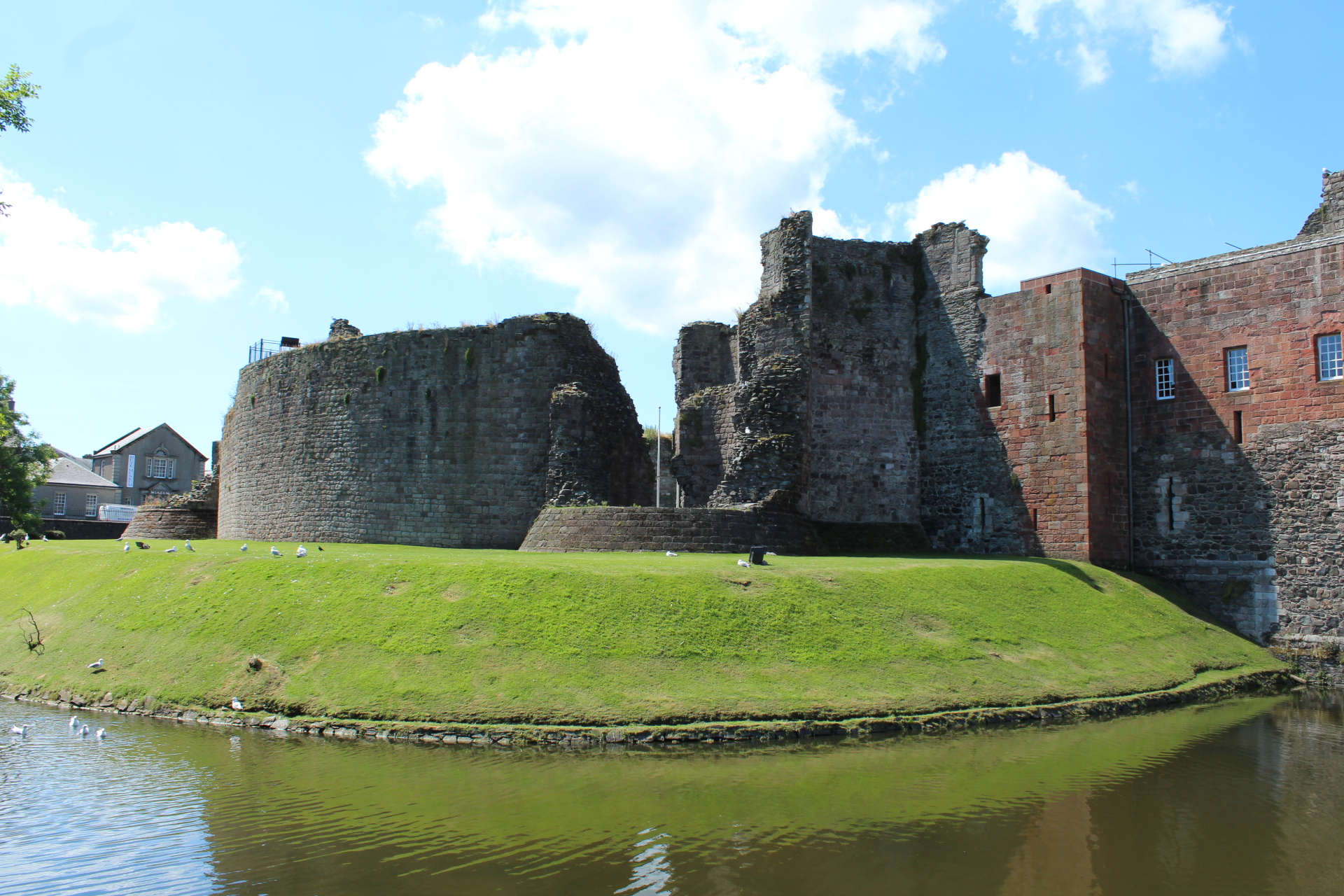
Ruinous Rothesay Castle. According to Hákonar saga Hákonarsonar, Óspakr's forces attacked the castle's soft stone walls, whilst the Scots poured boiling pitch down upon them. (Note: The saga states that the castle was commanded by a certain steward who was shot to death. One possibility is that the "steward" refers to Walter fitz Alan II, Steward of Scotland, the lord of the castle, and that the man killed was the castle's commander. The slain man could have been a relative of Walter. Later in the century, the castle appears to have undergone considerable reconstructional enhancement.)

News of the gathering Norwegian fleet soon reached Alexander II, who appears to have made straight for the western coast, diverting his attention to the now rapidly developing crisis. On 28 May, Alan is recorded in Alexander II's presence at Ayr, where the Scottish royal forces appear to have assembled. It was probably May or June when Óspakr's fleet rounded the Mull of Kintyre, entered the Firth of Clyde, and made landfall on Bute, where his forces successfully stormed and captured a fortress that is almost certainly identical to Rothesay Castle. The Flateyjarbók, Frísbók, and Skálholtsbók versions of the saga specify that the castle fell after three days of battle, and that three hundred Norwegians and Islesmen fell in the assault. By this stage in the campaign, the fleet is stated to have reached a size of eighty ships, a tally which may indicate that Óspakr's fighting-force numbered over three thousand men. Reports that Alan was in the vicinity, at the command of a massive fleet, are stated to have forced the Norwegians to withdraw to Kintyre. Whilst the Eirspennill version of the saga numbers Alan's fleet at almost two hundred ships, the Flateyjarbók, Frísbók, and Skálholtsbók versions give a tally of one hundred and fifty. These totals suggest that Alan commanded a force of two thousand or three thousand men. Having withdrawn his fleet to Kintyre, Óspakr took ill and died, presumably succumbing to injuries sustained from the assault on Bute. According to the saga, the king's death was bitterly lamented amongst his followers.

=== Óláfr and Guðrøðr Dond's shared kingship ===
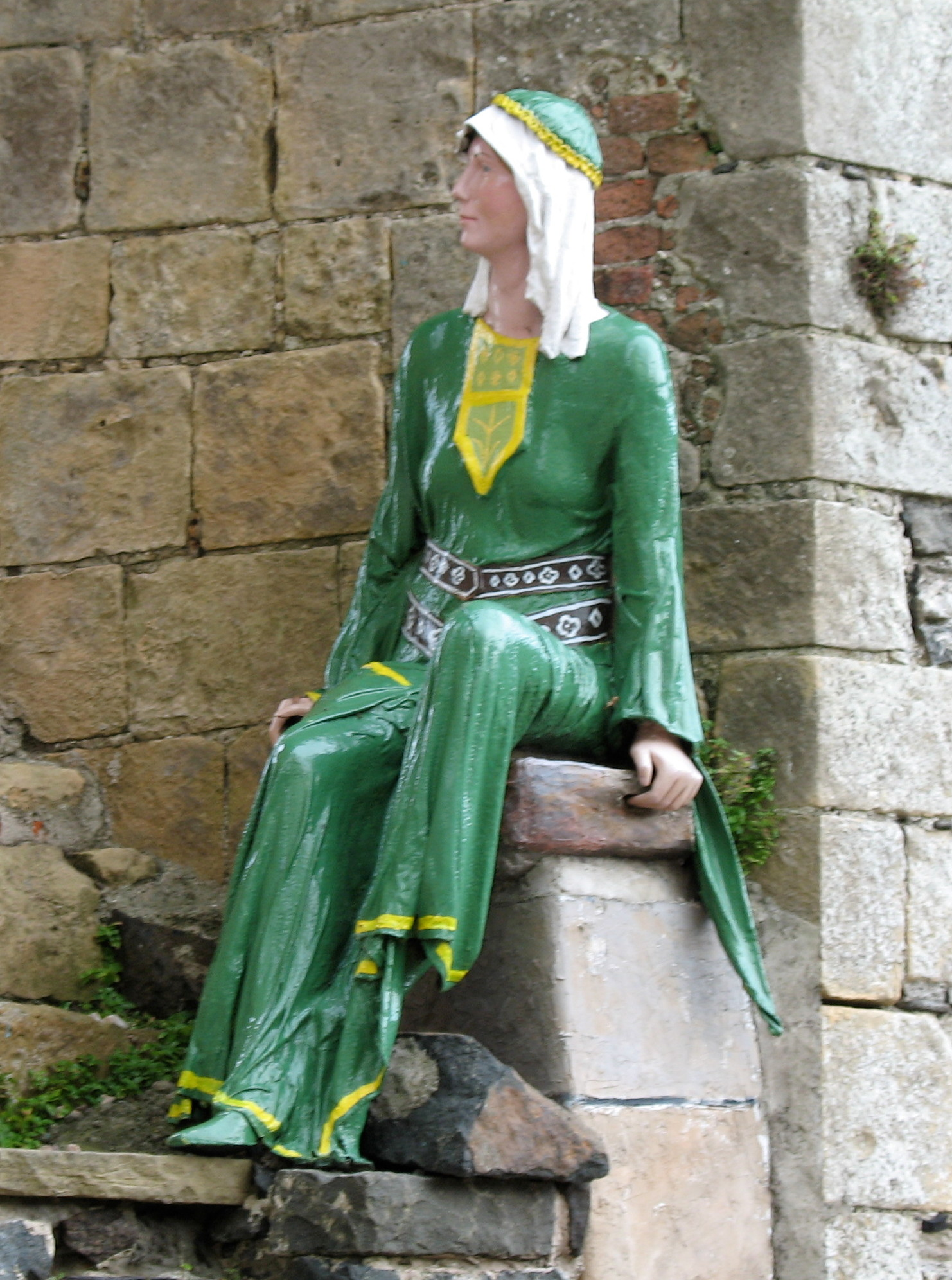
Mannequin of Óláfr's sister, Affrica, at Carrickfergus Castle. Affrica's likeness is looking through the window of the castle's great hall.

In consequence of Óspakr's fall, the saga reveals that command of the fleet was assumed by Óláfr, who successfully eluded Alan's forces by leading the force to the Kaupmannaeyjar ("Merchant Islands"), a group of islands which appear to refer to the Copeland Islands. (Note: The saga's reference to these islands may be the earliest record of the place name.) There is reason to suspect that this destination, just off the Ards Peninsula, was chosen in an effort to acquire both protection and provisioning. Specifically, the islands may have provided the fleet with the ability to prevent Alan—who was married to a daughter of Hugh—from drawing assistance from Ireland. It is also conceivable that the fleet procured logistical support from nearby Grey Abbey, a monastery founded by Óláfr's sister, Affrica. Another nearby religious house, Inch Abbey, founded by Affrica's husband, (Hugh's predecessor in Ulster) John de Courcy, could have also provided the fleet with provisions. (Note: Another site, further away down the Irish coast, within provisioning distance, is Carlingford, where Rǫgnvaldr received a grant from John, King of England in 1212. According to the Eirspennill version of the saga, the fleet arrived in the Kaupmannaeyjar before it proceeded on towards Mann. The Flateyjarbók, Frísbók, and Skálholtsbók versions of the saga specify that the fleet stayed in the Kaupmannaeyjar late into the winter before moving on.) After the fleet's stay at the Kaupmannaeyjar, the saga relates that it set sail for Mann, where a force of Manxmen led by a certain Þórkell Njálsson—an apparent Islesman who may have been allied to the Gallovidians—briefly resisted the incomers before being dispersed. According to the Chronicle of Lanercost and Chronicle of Mann, after having reached Mann, Óláfr and Guðrøðr Dond divided the kingdom between themselves, with Óláfr controlling Mann and Guðrøðr Dond the islands.

Despite Óspakr's elevation as king, it is uncertain how Hákon envisioned the governance of the Kingdom of the Isles. On one hand, it is possible that Hákon intended for Óspakr and Guðrøðr Dond to divide the kingdom at Óláfr's expense. On the other hand, the fact that Óláfr's struggle against Alan and Clann Somhairle is acclaimed by the saga could be evidence that Hákon did not intend to replace Óláfr with Óspakr. Instead, Hákon may have planned for Óspakr to reign over the sprawling domain of Clann Somhairle as a way to ensure the kindred's obedience. Óspakr's prospective realm, therefore, seems to have comprised Argyll, Kintyre, and the Inner Hebrides. If correct, the fleet's primary design would appear to have been the procurement of Óspakr's domain, whilst a secondary objective—adopted very late in the campaign—seems to have been the restoration of Óláfr on Mann.

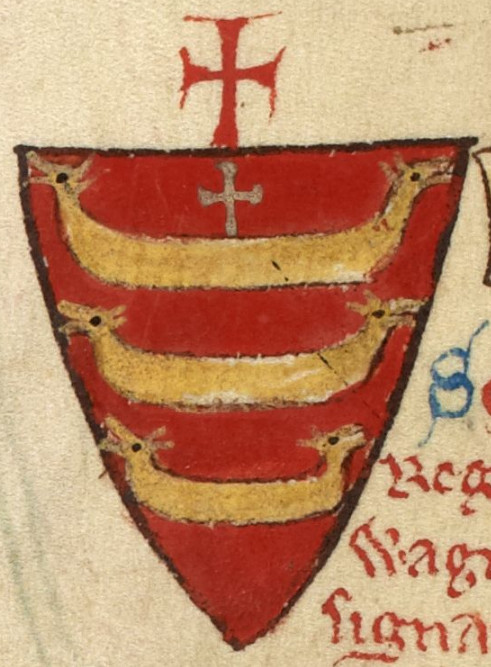
Coat of arms of Hákon Hákonarson as depicted on folio 150r of British Library Royal 14 C VII. (Note: The thirteenth-century Historia Anglorum is preserved by only one manuscript. The majority of the text and illustrations in this composition are the work of Matthew Paris, a man who met Hákon in 1248/1249, the year after the king's coronation. The emphasise that Matthew placed upon the Norwegian realm's sea power appears to be underscored in the heraldry he attributed to Hákon.)

It is also possible that Hákon originally ordered a division of power between Óláfr and Guðrøðr Dond, and that Hákon originally promised to lend support to Óláfr's cause on the condition of a concession of authority to Guðrøðr Dond, who—like Óspakr—could have been recognised as king by the Norwegian Crown. An accommodation between Óláfr and Guðrøðr Dond could well have benefited both men, as it would have safeguarded their kindred against the dynastic ambitions of Alan, offsetting the royal marriage between this man's son and Guðrøðr Dond's sister. There is certainly no further record of Alan pursuing military actions against Óláfr, which could be evidence that Alan came to terms with an arrangement between the two competing branches of the Crovan dynasty.

The pact between Óláfr and Guðrøðr Dond turned out to be short-lived. According to the saga, when the fleet left for Norway in the Spring, it clashed with the Kintyremen before sailing northward to Ljóðhús, where it ousted a certain Þórmóðr Þórkelsson from the island. (Note: The clash in Kintyre may have been against Domhnall. The fact that the Kintyremen are said to have offered stiff resistance to the invaders could indicate that the Scottish Crown had given Domhnall reinforcements. The Old Norse Ljóðhús is an early form of the place name of Lewis.) A few weeks after the fleet left the region for Orkney, the saga reports that Páll was slain in the Suðreyjar by Guðrøðr Dond. (Note: The Old Norse term Suðreyjar ("Southern Islands") roughly equates to the Hebrides and Mann.) According to the Chronicle of Mann and the Chronicle of Lanercost, Guðrøðr Dond established himself in the Hebrides but was later killed, with the former account locating his death on Lodhus. In any event, it is apparent that it was only after Guðrøðr Dond's demise that Óláfr was able to secure the full tenure of kingship. Óláfr went on to rule the realm until his death.

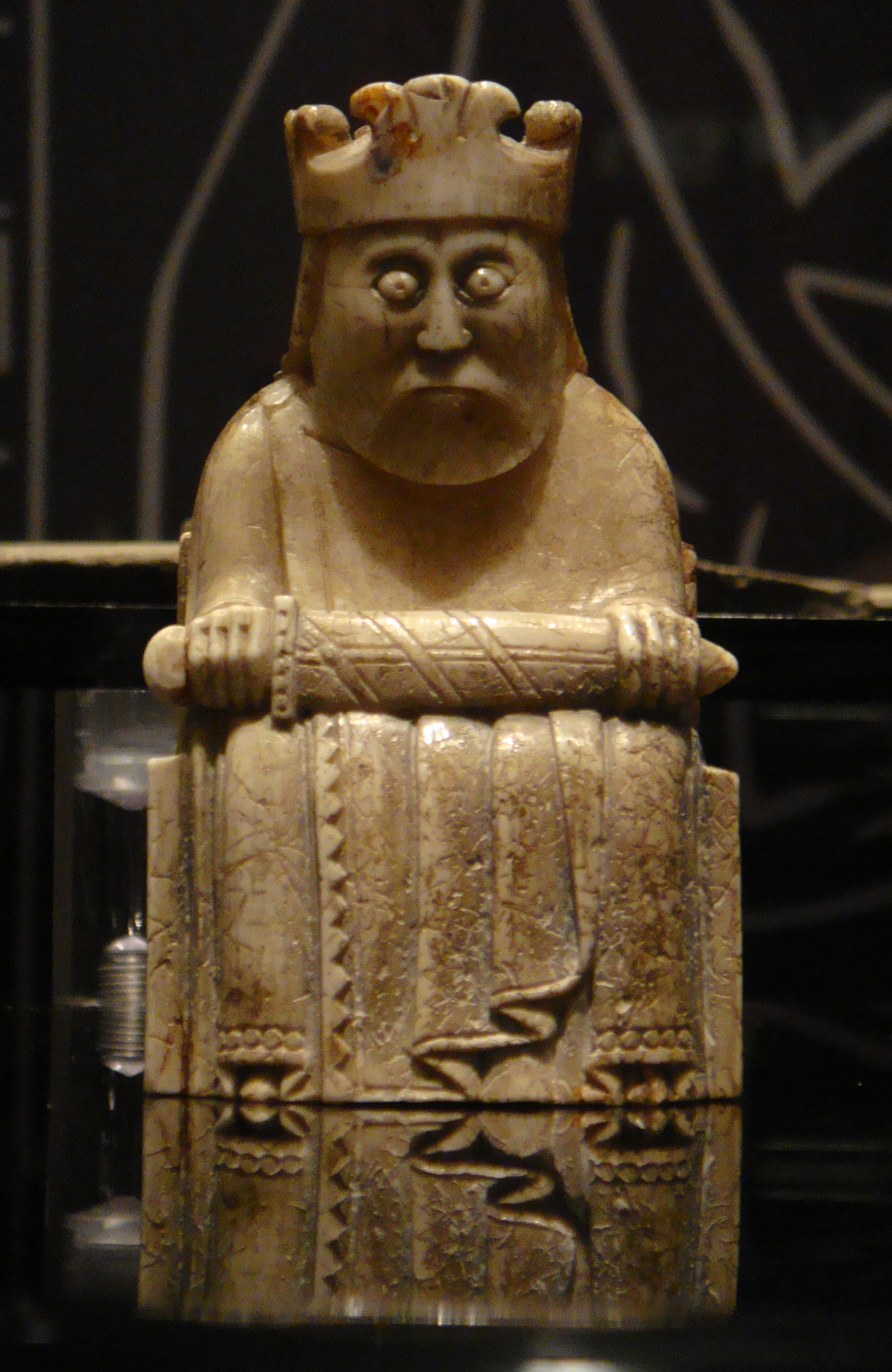
A king gaming piece of the Lewis chessmen.

Upon the homeward return of the Norwegians, the saga declares that Hákon's "honours had been won" as a result of the expedition, and states that Hákon himself heartily thanked the men for their service overseas. The operation seems to mark a turning point in the history of the Kingdom of the Isles. Although the kings that ruled the realm before Rǫgnvaldr could afford to ignore Norwegian royal authority, it is apparent that those who ruled after him required a closer relationship with the Norwegian Crown. Even though the Norwegians acclaimed the conclusion of the campaign, its only lasting achievement was Óláfr's restoration. The Scots too may have welcomed this outcome, considering the consolidation of the Crovan dynasty after years of chaos, and Óláfr's familial relationship with Fearchar, Alexander's principal northern protégé. Nevertheless, the campaign itself may have been the gravest crisis faced by the Scots since the English invasion of Scotland in 1216. Although Scottish sources fail to note the campaign of 1230, its magnitude is revealed by English sources such as the Chronicle of Lanercost, and the thirteenth-century Annales de Dunstaplia, with the latter reporting that the campaigning Norwegians and Islesmen were only overcome with much labour after they had invaded Scotland and Mann and inflicted considerable casualties.

The context of Guðrøðr Dond's final fall suggests that, despite his injuries and impairment, he was able to swiftly assert his authority and eliminate Páll. Although the Norwegians' presence may have temporarily constrained the implacable animosities of the Islesmen, the fleet's departure appears to have been the catalyst of renewed conflict. Evidently still an adherent of Óláfr—certainly, the two are reported to have sailed on the same ship on the outset of Óspakr's campaign—Páll's annihilation suggests that Guðrøðr Dond avenged his father's destruction and his own mutilation. The fact that Óláfr was able to regain and retain control of the realm after Guðrøðr Dond's demise suggests that Óláfr may have moved against him once the Norwegians left the region.

== Later reign ==
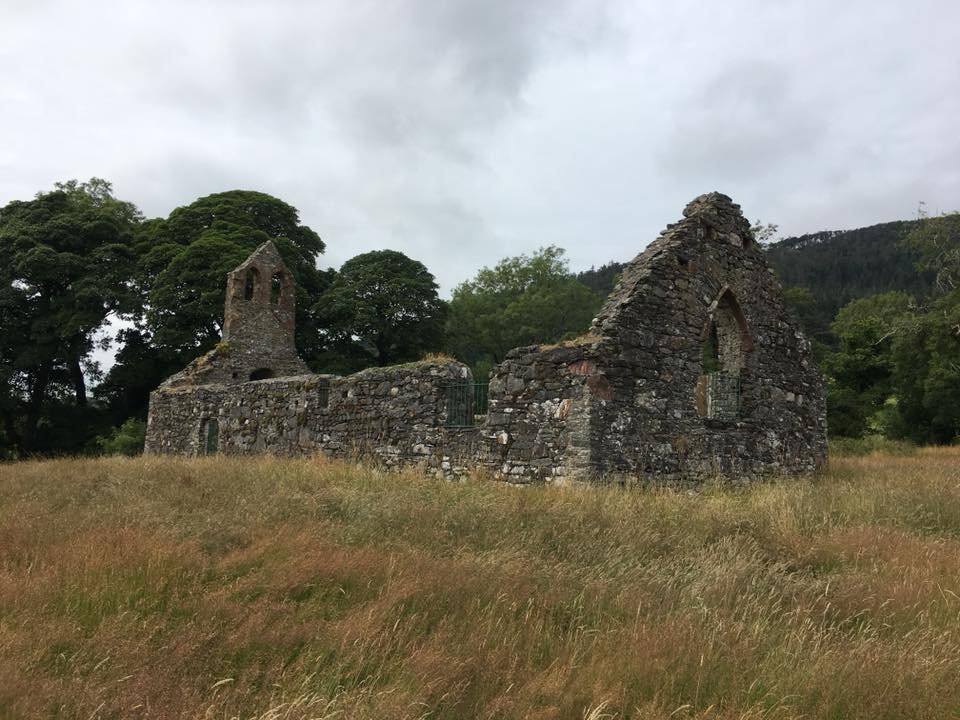
image a

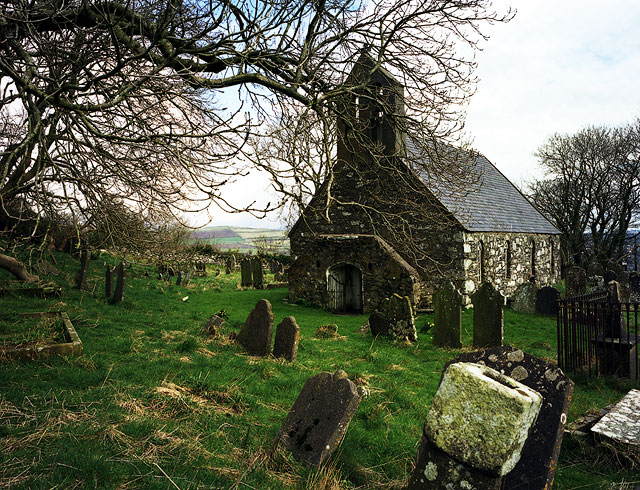
image b

Existing sites of two Manx churches recorded in acta dating to Óláfr's reign. The church of St Ninian (image a: St Trinian's Church) is largely a fourteenth-century ruin. The church of St Ronan (image b: Old St Runius Church) was drastically altered in the eighteenth century. (Note: Óláfr's grant exists in a sixteenth-century copy.)

After the campaign of 1230/1231, Alan ceased his policy of aggression against Óláfr, probably on account of Alexander, who afterwards pursued a more measured strategy dealing with the Norse-Gaelic magnates on the northwestern periphery of his realm. There is no evidence that Óláfr ever threatened the Scots after finally regaining authority. It is possible that he actually owed his release in about 1214 to Alexander himself. It may have been that, after his resumption of power in 1230/1231, the Scots failed to disturb him and he did not disturb them. (Note: According to the Chronicle of Mann, Óláfr's succeeding son, Haraldr, had "the firmest peace with the king of England and the king of Scotland, and was allied with them in friendship".) In the context of the campaign of 1230/1231, the Norwegians appear to have regarded Alan as their main opponent, not Alexander. It is possible that the latter regarded Alan's ambitions in the Isles, and his warring against Óláfr, as a root cause of the crisis faced by the Scots that year. In any case, Alexander afterwards appears to have relied upon Walter fitz Alan II, Steward of Scotland, and the latter's kin, to extend Scottish royal authority into Argyll and the Isles. It was not until the 1240s that the Scots resumed aggressive actions in the west. (Note: In 1235, Alan's illegitimate son, Thomas, led a revolt in Galloway against the Scottish Crown. The fact that Fearchar played a leading part in the defeat of this rising could be evidence that he was still engaged in Óláfr's interests.)

At some point during his reign, he is known to have granted certain commercial rights and protections to the monks of Holm Cultram Abbey. At one point he granted rights to the priory of Whithorn concerning two churches on Mann (St Ninian at Ballacgniba and St Ronan), and at another point granted the priory of St Bees sixty head of cattle or the equivalent value in sheep or swine. Óláfr's 1228 letter to Henry reveals that Óláfr involved himself with mercantile activity.

In 1235, Óláfr journeyed to the court of Henry, as evidenced by an English letter of safe passage issued in April 1235. That July, Óláfr is recorded to have rendered homage to Henry, and to have received payment for his services in safeguarding the English and Irish coasts for the English Crown. As a result, Óláfr pledged to secure the English and Irish coasts faithfully, and to supply the English with fifty galleys when needed: all for the annual allowance of forty marks, one hundred crannocks of wheat, and five hogsheads of wine.

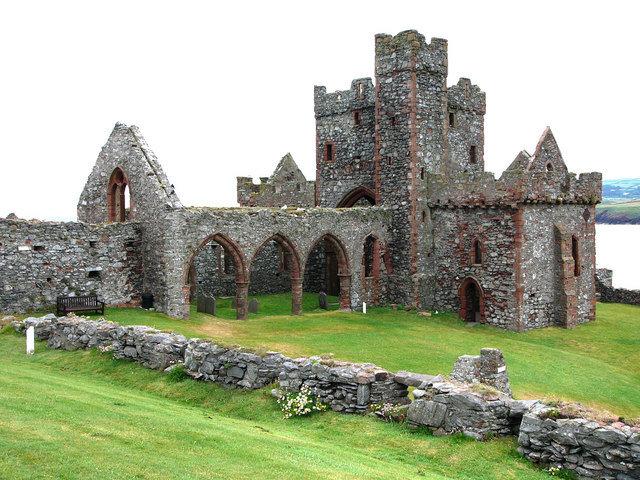
The ruins of St German's Cathedral on St Patrick's Isle. Óláfr may have been a patron of the church. The site has undergone several phases of construction over the centuries.

Near the end of his reign, Óláfr appears to have commenced another visit to Norway, as evidenced by directives of Henry instructing his subjects to protect Óláfr and his kingdom during his absence (issued in May 1236, and April 1237).

Óláfr may have been a patron of St German's Cathedral on St Patrick's Isle, as the chronicle reports that this religious house was constructed by Simon, Bishop of the Isles. The site itself appears to have been established in the twelfth- or thirteenth century. Early diocesan bishops, during the eleventh and twelfth centuries, may well have circulated from region to region in the Isles, and it is possible that the cathedral's foundation represents the final settling of the diocesan see. The site has undergone several phases of construction over the centuries, and it is uncertain what part can be credited to Simon. (Note: Simon built an ecclesiastical palace near the village of Kirk Michael at Bishops Court. The earliest evidence of ecclesiastical structures on the islet date to the tenth- and eleventh centuries. St German's Cathedral was certainly in existence by 1231, when it was noted by a papal bull concerning the Diocese of the Isles.) Óláfr's actions in the northern Hebrides could indicate that he was also a patron of the Snizort Cathedral on Skeabost Island, a religious house that first appears on record in the fourteenth century.

Although Óláfr—like his father and grandfather—styled himself in Latin rex insularum, his sons Haraldr and Magnús used the form rex mannie et insularum. The latter style is nevertheless accorded to Óláfr by the chronicle in the record of his death. It was also accorded to members of the family by the English chancellery in thirteenth century, seemingly before its adoption by the Islesmen themselves. The title rex insularum is the equivalent of the Gaelic rí Innsi Gall ("king of the islands of the foreigners") first recorded in 989, a style almost certainly referring to Mann and the Hebrides. (Note: This title is accorded to Gofraidh mac Arailt, King of the Isles. In 1005, the latter's son, Raghnall, who also ruled as King of the Isles, is styled rí na nInnsi ("king of the islands"), a more literal equivalent of the Latin title.)

== Death ==
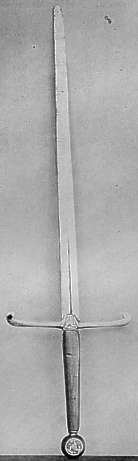
image a

image b

Although the Manx Sword of State (image a) is popularly linked to Óláfr, it only dates to the fifteenth century. The pictured grave slab (image b) dates to the thirteenth century, and may be associated with Óláfr or his sons Rǫgnvaldr and Magnús. (Note: The sword probably dates to the fifteenth century and the blade is similar to ones of the seventeenth century. The sword may have been crafted for the meetings of Tynwald attested in 1417 and 1422.)

Óláfr's reign spanned from 1226 to 1237. Although a significant portion of the Chronicle of Mann is devoted to the strife between him and Rǫgnvaldr, the span of Óláfr's reign is covered in only a few lines. According to this source Óláfr died on 21 May 1237, on St Patrick's Isle, and was buried at Rushen Abbey. This monastic house, the foremost ecclesiastical site on Mann, had originally been founded by his paternal grandfather in 1134. By the thirteenth century, it served as a royal mausoleum of the Crovan dynasty, being the burial place of three of the family's four kings that ruled between 1226 and 1265. Óláfr was the first royal to be laid to rest at Rushen. The others were his sons Rǫgnvaldr, and Magnús. There is a possibility that a thirteenth-century stone coffin-lid or grave-slab found at Rushen may be associated with one of the three kings buried there. The fact that Óláfr and his father died on St Patrick's Isle suggests that it was a royal residence. It is possible that the seat of Manx royal power was located at Peel Castle, on St Patrick's Isle, before the seat moved to Castle Rushen in the thirteenth century. (Note: Óláfr's son, Magnús, died at Castle Rushen.)

== Descendants ==
Óláfr was survived by three children: Haraldr, Rǫgnvaldr, and Magnús—all of whom eventually ruled as kings. (Note: The chronicle states that Óláfr and two of his sons, Haraldr and Magnús, were knighted by Henry. The knighthoods of Haraldr (in 1246/1247) and Magnús (in 1256) appear to be confirmed by independent English sources. For example, an English letter of safe conduct for Magnús, granted in 1256, states that he was invested with a military belt by the English king. Although no document states as such for Haraldr, he was certainly granted a letter of safe conduct by the English Crown in 1246. Moreover, thirteenth-century Chronica majora also makes note of the knighting of Haraldr and Magnús.) Óláfr was succeeded by his son, Haraldr, who was in turn succeeded by Óláfr's son, Rǫgnvaldr. This monarch was slain in 1249, seemingly by an associate of Guðrøðr Dond's son, Haraldr, whereupon the latter assumed the kingship. This abrupt seizure of royal power by Guðrøðr Dond's son—almost twenty years after Guðrøðr Dond's death—exposes the fact that the inter-dynastic strife between lines of (Guðrøðr Dond's father) Rǫgnvaldr and Óláfr carried on for yet another generation. The infighting only came to an end in the reign of the dynasty's final monarch, Óláfr's son, Magnús.

The mother of Óláfr's children is uncertain. Although no source names the mother of his son, Haraldr, the chronicle asserts that the latter was only fourteen years old at the time of Óláfr's death. This would place Haraldr's birth in 1222 or 1223, at about the time that Óláfr married Cairistíona, which indicates that either Cairistíona or Lauon could have been Haraldr's mother. As for Haraldr's two succeeding brothers, it is conceivable that Cairistíona was their mother. If Lauon was indeed the mother of Haraldr and a descendant of Raghnall, this relationship could explain why Ruaidhrí and Domhnall—apparently close adherents of Óláfr's half-brother, Rǫgnvaldr—are not recorded to have opposed Óláfr after Rǫgnvaldr's death. (Note: In an episode taking place after the death of Haraldr, the chronicle makes note of an aged nobleman named "Dofnaldus" who was regarded by Haraldr as a close friend. This man may well be identical to Domhnall himself.) Certainly, the recorded history of the Isles between the 1230s and 1240s is remarkably peaceful in comparison to other eras.

There is evidence to suggest that Óláfr had a fourth son, Guðrøðr. (Note: Since at least the late eighteenth-century, Óláfr has been erroneously identified as the father of Leód, eponymous ancestor of Clann Leóid (the MacLeods). Whilst a letter said to date to the seventeenth century claims that the clan descends from Óláfr, another source—an account of the clan also composed in the seventeenth century—claims that Leód was instead a son of Guðrøðr Dond's son, Haraldr. In any case, such lines of descent from the Crovan dynasty are unsupported by any contemporary evidence, and are contradicted by traditional Gaelic genealogies of the clan.) For example, the chronicle relates that, not long after Haraldr's succession, Haraldr visited the Hebrides and left control of Mann to Lochlann, his kinsman who governed the island in his place. In the following autumn, Lochlann and his supporters are said to have come into conflict with Hebridean supporters of Haraldr, and when the latter returned to Mann in the spring, the chronicle reports that Lochlann fled to Wales with all his men and his foster son, a youth identified as Guðrøðr, the son of a man named Óláfr. The ship they were travelling on is stated to have been wrecked upon the Welsh coast, and although Lochlann was able to make it ashore safely, he returned to the scene in an attempt to save Guðrøðr. According to the chronicle, Lochlann, Guðrøðr, and about forty others lost their lives in the shipwreck.

It is possible that Lochlann's foster son is identical to a similarly named individual, a certain "Godredo filio regis Mannie", who attested a quitclaim between Llywelyn ap Gruffudd and Ralph de Mortimer, in about 1241. (Note: The document records an important transaction, between the emerging Welsh nobleman (Llywelyn) and the Anglo-Norman magnate (Ralph), in which the rights of the Mortimer lordships of Maelienydd and Gwerthrynion, located in eastern-central Wales, are relinquished by Llywelyn and his heirs to Ralph, his wife and his heirs.) It is uncertain what compelled Lochlann to flee his sovereign, and it is uncertain why he chose Wales as his destination. The Crovan dynasty certainly had diplomatic and familial connections with the Welsh. One possibility is that the account of Lochlann's flight reveals that he attempted to replace Óláfr's son, Haraldr, with another son. If the chronicle is incorrect in its account of the foster-son's maritime demise, and he is indeed identical to the like-named Manx prince attested in Wales, this individual's activities outside the realm of his ancestors may have been a consequence of strife following Óláfr's death and Haraldr's accession. Haraldr's young age at the time, and the fact that he had a potential rival in the person of his like-named cousin, Haraldr Guðrøðarson, could indicate that Haraldr had been designated as successor during his father's lifetime.

== Ancestry ==
Ancestors of Olaf the Black

8. Guðrøðr Crovan, King of Dublin and the Isles (died 1095)
4. Óláfr Guðrøðarson, King of the Isles (died 1153)
2. Guðrøðr Óláfsson, King of Dublin and the Isles (died 1187)
10. Fearghus, Lord of Galloway (died 1161)
5. Affraic inghean Fearghusa
Illegitimate daughter of Henry II of England
1. Óláfr Guðrøðarson (died 1237)
12. Muirchertach Mac Lochlainn, High King of Ireland (died 1166)
6. Niall Mac Lochlainn, King of Cineál Eoghain (died 1176)
3. Fionnghuala Nic Lochlainn

== Citations ==
Regnal titles
Preceded by Rǫgnvaldr Guðrøðarson	King of the Isles; 1226–1237	Succeeded by Haraldr Óláfsson
