= Olaf of Mann and the Isles =

Olaf of Mann and the Isles or Olaf of the Isle of Man may refer to:

- Olaf I of Mann (c. 1080–1153)
- Olaf II of Mann (1173/4–1237)
