= Bishop of Sodor =

Bishop of Sodor may refer to:

- The pre-Reformation Bishop of the Isles, also known as Bishop of Sodor
- The Church of England Bishop of Sodor and Man
