= Colin Graham (New Zealand cricketer) =

New Zealand cricketer (1929–2020)

Personal information
- Full name: Colin Gordon Graham
- Born: 7 June 1929; Dunedin, New Zealand
- Died: 26 March 2020 (aged 90); Timaru, New Zealand
- Batting: Right handed
- Bowling: Right-arm medium
- Relatives: Archibald Graham

Domestic team information
- Years: Team
- 1954/55–1955/56: Otago

Career statistics
Competition	First-class
Matches	5
Runs scored	133
Batting average	16.62
100s/50s	0/0
Top score	46
Balls bowled	66
Wickets	0
Bowling average	–
5 wickets in innings	–
10 wickets in match	–
Best bowling	–
Catches/stumpings	3/–
- Source: CricketArchive, 9 April 2020

Colin Gordon Graham (7 June 1929 – 26 March 2020) was a New Zealand cricketer. He played five first-class matches for Otago between 1954 and 1956.

Graham was born at Dunedin and educated at Otago Boys' High School, as was his older brother Archibald Graham. He worked as a teacher. Graham died on 26 March 2020.
