= Nicholas I (bishop of the Isles) =

Nicholas (fl. 1147–1152) was a twelfth-century Bishop-elect of the Isles but there is no evidence that he was ever consecrated.

== Career ==
Nicholas' ecclesiastical predecessor, Wimund, Bishop of the Isles appears to have used his elevated position to violently seek the inheritance of an Earl of Moray in the late 1140s. Wimund's warring against the Scots eventually forced David I to cede him lands near Furness, before Wimund's capture and mutilation in 1152. It is likely that Wimund's campaigning led to the abandonment of his diocesan see, and posed a serious problem to the authority of Óláfr Guðrøðarson, King of the Isles (died 1153). A letter from Óláfr to the chapter of York suggests that the king unsuccessfully attempted to have Nicholas consecrated as Bishop of the Isles by Robert de Ghent, Dean of York (died c.1158). The fact that Óláfr interacted with the dean suggests that the correspondence dates between the 1147 deposition of William fitz Herbert, Archbishop of York (died 1154) and the 1152 consecration of Henry Murdac, Archbishop of York (died 1153). Óláfr's inability to have his man consecrated may have been due to the Wimund episode being unresolved at the time. According to the twelfth-century Chronica Roberti de Torigneio and the thirteenth-century Flores historiarum, Henry Murdac consecrated John, a Benedictine monk from Normandy, as Bishop of the Isles in 1152.
