= Richard (bishop of the Isles) =

English bishop

Richard was a late 13th century Bishop of the Isles. He was a native Englishman, and formerly a canon of St Andrews. According to the Chronicle of Mann, Richard was bishop for twenty-three years. Following his return from the Second Council of Lyon in 1274, the chronicle states that Richard died at "Langalyver in Coplandia" and was buried at the monastery of St Mary at Furness.
