= Christian of Whithorn =

Christian of Whithorn was Bishop of Whithorn (1154–1186), the second incumbent of that Episcopal See since it had been resurrected by King Fergus of Galloway earlier in the 12th century.

It has been suggested by some scholars that Christian had been a Cistercian monk, possibly one of the brethren at Holm Cultram in Cumberland. Christian was consecrated as Bishop of Whithorn in December 1154. Christian was the successor of Gilla Aldan. Christian spent his first few years as Bishop of Whithorn under the reign of Fergus, King of Galloway. However, when Fergus passed power on to his two sons, Uchtred and Gilla Brigte, it was the former with whom Christian spent his time, that is until Uchtred's death at the hands of Gilla Brigte's son in 1174. Christian was a frequent witness to Uchtred's charters, and even appears alongside Uchtred in a charter of King Máel Coluim IV of Scotland. Indeed, Christian and Uchtred together brought areas such as Desnes Ioan outside of the control of the Bishopric of Glasgow into the control of Whithorn.

There is strong cumulative evidence that Christian was an English nominee, and indeed, Christian was consecrated on exactly the same day that King Henry II of England received his coronation. Christian firmly maintained the position of Whithorn as a suffragan of York. This was in contrast to the stances of the other "Scottish" bishoprics, who firmly rejected the pretensions of the two English archbishops to control the Scottish church. Indeed, Christian was the only "Scottish" bishop to attend the English episcopal Council at London in 1176–1177.

In contrast to his relations with Uchtred, Christian's relations with Gilla Brigte seem to have been strained. Reginald of Durham reported that Christian was persecuted by "a certain powerful man", and this man can only have been Gilla Brigte, in whose lands Whithorn actually lay. For most of his time as bishop, Christian predominantly resided in Cumberland, perhaps indicating the hostility of Gilla Brigte.

He died on 7 October 1186, at Holm Cultram, where he was buried.

== Notes ==
Catholic Church titles
Preceded by Gilla Aldan	Bishop of Whithorn; 1154–1186	Succeeded by John
