= Robert Wallace (bishop) =

Bishop of the Isles

Robert Wallace was a Bishop of the Isles.

== Biography ==
Descended from the family of Craigie, Mr Michael Wallace, a regent in the University of Glasgow, was in 1610 appointed one of the ministers of Kilmarnock. He subscribed the "Protestation for the Liberties of the Kirk", 27 June 1617, and died in May 1641, aged about sixty. By his wife, Margaret Mirrie, who survived him, he had a son, Robert.

Robert Wallace graduated at the University of Glasgow in 1631, and was in 1640 admitted minister of Barnwell. He supported the cause of the Public Resolutioners, and in 1662 was, through the influence of his cousin-german, the Earl of Glencairn, appointed Bishop of the Isles. He died in Glasgow on 16 May 1669, aged fifty-five. By his wife, Margaret, second daughter of John Cunningham of Cambuskeith, he had two sons, Hugh and John; also three daughters, Margaret, Agnes, and another who married John McKerrell of Hillhouse. John, the younger son, was a captain in the army, and proprietor of the lands of Slosse; also of Riccarton-Holmes, Woodhill, and others in the parish of Riccarton. He died prior to 4 August 1708. His affairs were administered by Sir Thomas Wallace of Craigie.

Hugh, the elder son, was admitted advocate, 19 July 1670; he had a son, Robert. Originally a merchant in Edinburgh, Robert afterwards held office in the customs at Cromarty and Inverness; he was, on 15 December 1724 and 21 August 1735, served heir to his aunts, Agnes and Margaret Wallace, daughters of the Bishop of the Isles.
