= Archibald Graham (cricketer) =

New Zealand cricketer

Personal information
- Full name: Archibald Clifford Graham
- Born: 20 January 1917; Dunedin, New Zealand
- Died: 10 June 2000 (aged 83); Auckland, New Zealand
- Relatives: Colin Graham

Domestic team information
- Years: Team
- 1944/45: Otago

Career statistics
Competition	First-class
Matches	1
Runs scored	10
Batting average	5.00
100s/50s	0/0
Top score	8
Balls bowled	232
Wickets	4
Bowling average	17.75
5 wickets in innings	0
10 wickets in match	0
Best bowling	4/22
Catches/stumpings	0/0
- Source: ESPNcricinfo, 10 April 2020

Archibald Clifford Graham (20 January 1917 – 10 June 2000) was a New Zealand cricketer. He played one first-class match for Otago in 1944/45.

Graham was born at Dunedin in 1917 and educated at Otago Boys' High School. He worked as a journalist. Following his death in 2000 an obituary was published in the New Zealand Cricket Almanack. Graham's brother, Colin Graham, also played cricket for Otago.
