= Nicholas de Meaux =

Nicholas de Meaux, also known as Nicholas of Meaux, was a thirteenth-century Abbot of Furness and Bishop of the Isles. In 1217, with the death of Nicholas, Bishop of the Isles (died 1217), two candidates vied for the vacant position: Nicholas and a certain Reginald (died c. 1226), who is described by the Chronicle of Mann as related to the ruling family of the Kingdom of the Isles. Although the monks of Furness Abbey had elected Nicholas as Bishop of the Isles, as was their right, Nicholas received opposition from the ruling family of the Isles, and never occupied the see.
