= Wimund =

English medieval bishop

Wimund was a bishop who became a seafaring warlord adventurer in the years after 1147. His story is passed down to us by 12th-century English historian William of Newburgh in his Historia rerum anglicarum, Book I, Chapter 24 entitled "Of bishop Wimund, his life unbecoming a bishop, and how he was deprived of his sight".

== Wimund's origins ==
William records that Wimund was "born in the most obscure spot in England". He was educated at Furness Abbey, then in Lancashire, founded 1123–1127 by the future Stephen I of England. Wimund may have been a member of the party sent from Furness to found a house at Rushen on the Isle of Man by request of Amlaíb mac Gofraid, the King of the Isles, in 1134.

King Amlaíb granted the monks of Furness the right to elect the Bishop of the Isles, and it appears that Wimund was elected to the see during the time of Thurstan (II), Archbishop of York. Thurstan died in early 1140, so that Wimund became Bishop of the Isles in the period 1134–1140. This was a very rapid rise for a young man of apparently obscure origins.

However, as William of Newburgh relates, Wimund in time claimed to be the son of the mormaer of Moray. William, and some later writers, doubted Wimund's claims. Modern historians have been more inclined to take this claim seriously. Some have proposed that Wimund was a son of Óengus of Moray (died 1130), grandson of King Lulach mac Gille Coemgáin. However, his link with Cumbria has led to the supposition that Wimund was a son (possibly illegitimate) of William fitz Duncan, son of King Duncan II. William held extensive lands in Cumbria through his mother, Octreda, daughter of Cospatrick of Northumbria, and is believed to have been Mormaer or Earl of Moray between Óengus's death in 1130 and his own death in 1147.

== Bishop Wimund ==
The following is a summary of William of Newburgh's account of the life of Bishop Wimund.

Wimund's bishopric of the Isles had its seat on the Isle of Skye. The ruins of Snizort Cathedral, dedicated to Columba, are still visible near Skeabost. William of Newburgh writes that Wimund, "[n]ot content with the dignity of his episcopal office, he next anticipated in his mind how he might accomplish great and wonderful things; for he possessed a haughty speaking mouth with the proudest heart."

However, Wimund's father, if he was indeed the son of William fitz Duncan, was alive for the first seven years at least of his time as a Bishop of the Isles. So long as his father was alive, Wimund need hardly "[feign] himself to be the son of the earl of Moray and that he was deprived of the inheritance of his fathers by the king of Scotland" as William says. But William may be anticipating himself; Wimund's first conflict was not with his uncle King David I, but with a fellow bishop, and there is no reason to suppose that these two conflicts were linked.

During Wimund's episcopate, or shortly before its beginning, Gille Aldan was consecrated Bishop of Whithorn, probably by the agreement of Fergus of Galloway and Archbishop Thurstan, and with the approval of Pope Honorius III. The lands of the recreated Bishopric of Whithorn had probably been subject to the Bishops of the Isles, and for rival bishops to employ armed force to drive off their rivals was hardly unknown. Thus, rather than to gain his inheritance, Wimund's struggle with Gille Aldan was apparently an attempt to prevent his bishopric being partitioned in favour of a rival.

After being captured, he was blinded and castrated and spent the rest of his life at the monastery at Byland Abbey in North Yorkshire.
