= Archibald Graham (bishop) =

Archibald Graham (1644–1702) was a Scottish prelate from the 17th century who served as the last Church of Scotland Bishop of the Isles. He was nicknamed McIlvernock.

== Life ==
From the Graham family of Kilbride, he was born in 1644 and educated at Glasgow University graduating MA in around 1660. He became a Church of Scotland minister, and was parson of Rothesay in 1667, becoming Bishop of the Isles in June 1680. From 1682 he also held the additional role as minister of Kingarth.

After the Revolution of 1688, all Church of Scotland bishops, including Graham, lost their sees as episcopacy was abolished in Scotland by Act of Parliament in 1690. He died of fever in Edinburgh on 28 June 1702.

== Family ==
He married Grizel Campbell, daughter of Sir Dugald Campbell of Auchenbreck, and widow of Sir James Stewart of Bute. Their daughter Helen died in 1739 and is buried in Canongate Kirkyard.

He secondly married Margaret Coupar daughter of Sir John Coupar of Gogar (just west of Edinburgh).

Church of Scotland titles
Preceded by Andrew Wood	Bishop of the Isles	Episcopacy abolished
