= Bishop of the Isles =

Medieval bishopric of Scotland

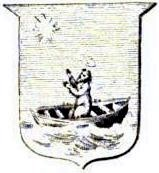
Arms of the Diocese of the Isles.

The Bishop of the Isles or Bishop of Sodor was the ecclesiastical head of the Diocese of the Isles (or Sodor), one of Scotland's thirteen medieval bishoprics. The bishopric, encompassing both the Hebrides and Mann, probably traces its origins as an ecclesiastical unity to the careers of Olaf, King of the Isles, and Bishop Wimund. Previously, there had been numerous bishoprics and recorded bishoprics include Kingarth, Iona, Skye and Mann. There were very likely numerous others.

== List of precursor bishoprics ==
=== List of known bishops of Iona ===
Tenure	Incumbent	Notes
d. 623	Fergno Britt mac Faílbi	Was one of the companions of Saint Columba. He was the 4th abbot of Iona, and is also styled "bishop".
fl. x697–712	Coeddi	The Annals of Ulster, s.a. 712.1, records his death and styles him Coeddi episcopus Iae (i.e. "Coeddi, Bishop of Iona").
d. 713	Dorbbéne	Dunchad appears to have been Abbot of Iona during Dorbbéne's time in charge. Either the abbacy was divided or Dorbbéne was bishop while Dunchad was abbot.
fl. mid. 9th century	Patrick	Testified as bishop "i Suðreyjam" (in the Hebrides) in Norse sources, was perhaps merely a legendary figure.
d. 963	Fothad	According to the Annals of the Four Masters, s.a. 961.3 (=s.a. 963), he was Fothadh, mac Brain, scribhnidh ⁊ espucc Insi Alban; that is, "Fothad, son of Bran, scribe and bishop of the islands of Scotland". We know from other sources that he was probably bishop of Cennrígmonaid (i.e. St. Andrews), or at least "High Bishop of Scotland" without a specific see.
d. 966	Finguine	The Annals of the Four Masters record his death in 966 (=s.a. M964.3) as "anchorite and Bishop of Iona".

=== List of known bishops of Cenn Garad ===
Kingarth was a church on the Isle of Bute, supposedly founded by Saint Chattan and Saint Blane. Three abbots are known, but only two bishops. Sadly, little is known about the abbey, bishopric and individual clerics.

Tenure	Incumbent	Notes
d. 660	Daniél	The Annals of Ulster, s.a. 660.1, records the death of this "and Daniél, bishop of Cenn Garad".
d. 689	Iolán	The Annals of Ulster, s.a. 689.1, record the death of this Iolán, "bishop of Cenn Garad".

=== List of known bishops of Mann ===
Tenure	Incumbent	Notes
x1079	Roolwer	
x1079	William	
fl. 1079x1095	Hamond	
el. 1103x1108	Anonymous	An unnamed bishop is presented for consecration to Gerard, the Archbishop of York. He may or may not have been Wimund.

== Bishops of the Isles ==
=== List of known bishops of Isles (including Mann) ===
List of bishops known to have ruled the whole of what became the Diocese of the Isles (Sodor)
Tenure	Incumbent	Notes
1134–× 1148	Wimund	Described as bishop of sancta ecclesia de Schith "holy church of Skye" (1109 × 1114). His bishopric may have been confined to Skye until 1134 × 1138, when he was definitely bishop of the Isles and Mann.
x 1148–× 1152	Nicholas (I.)	Presented by Óláfr Guðrøðarson, King of the Isles to the Dean of York for consecration; no positive evidence that he took office.
1151 × 1152–1152 × 1154	John (I.)	Not known to have possessed his see. He was probably a candidate of the Archbishop of York who proved unacceptable to Óláfr.
1154–1154 × 1166	Gamaliel	
1154 × 1166–1170	Reginald (I.)	A Norwegian; called, variously, Reinarb, Reinar, Nemar and Nemarr.
1166–1170 × 1194	Christian	It is possible that this is the same as Christian, Bishop of Whithorn.
x 1194–1203	Michael	
1203 × 1210–1217	Nicholas (II.)	Also called Koli, a Scandinavian shortening of Nicholas.
1217 × 1226	Reginald (II.)	A relation of the royal family of the Isles. May not have had the support of Furness Abbey, who at that point held the right to elect the Bishop of the Isles.
1217 × 1219–1224 × 1225	Nicholas de Meaux	Was Abbot of Furness.
1224 × 1226–1226	John (II.), son of Hefar	Died in an accident soon after becoming bishop.
1226–1248	Simon	
1248	Laurence	Laurence had been the archdeacon of Mann, and was elected to the bishopric after the death of Bishop Simon. He presented himself to the King of Norway and the Archbishop of Trondheim; the king would not agree to the election until he had visited personally; however, Laurence and his party drowned near Shetland on the voyage back to Mann.
1253–1275	Richard [de Natherton?]	An Englishman who was a canon of St Andrews Cathedral Priory in Scotland. Surname "de Natherton" is hypothetical, but supported by evidence.
el. 1275	Gilbert	An Englishman. Previously Abbot of Rushen, he was apparently elected to the see after the death of Bishop Richard. However, Alexander III, King of Scotland ignored the election and installed instead Mark.
1275–1303	Mark	Latin: Marcus. A native of Galloway. Blind at his death in 1303.
1303 × 1305–1322	Alan	Scottish Gaelic: Ailean. Died in office.
1324–1326 × 1327	Gilbert Maclellan	Scottish Gaelic: Giolla-Brighde Mac Giolla-Faoláin. A native of Galloway. Died in office.
1327 × 1328–1328 × 1331	Bernard of Kilwinning	
1331	Cormac Cormacii	Scottish Gaelic: Cormac Mac Chormaic. Elected by canons of Skye, but does not appear to have obtained confirmation.
1331–1348	Thomas de Rossy	
1349–1374	William Russell	
1374–1387/1392	John Dongan	Deprived of bishopric in 1387 by Scottish-backed Avignon Pope Clement VII. Continued in English-controlled Mann until 1392, but from 1387 onwards the diocese has permanently split into two parts.

=== List of bishops of the Isles (excluding Mann) ===
The bishopric of the Isles became divided, primarily because the see became divided between the kings of England and Scotland. The English had taken over Mann, leaving the other islands to the north under Scottish overlordship.

Tenure	Incumbent	Notes
1387–1409	Michael	Translated from Cashel by Antipope Clement VII, upon deprivation of Dongan.
1410–c.1421	Richard Payl	Translated from Dromore by Antipope John XXIII. Recognised bishop of the Isles until c.1421 and bishop of Mann until c.1429/33.
prov. 1422	Michael Ochiltree	Received papal provision, but was aborted.
1426–1437 × 1441	Angus (I.)	Scottish Gaelic: Aonghas. Son of Donald Macdonald, Lord of the Isles.
1441–1467 × 1472	John Hectoris MacGilleon	Scottish Gaelic: Eóin Mac Gill-Eathain.
1472–1479 × 1480	Angus (II.)	Scottish Gaelic: Aonghas, son of Angus Macdonald, Bishop of the Isles in 1426.
1487–1490	John Campbell (I.)	Scottish Gaelic: Eóin Caimbeul.
1510–1513	George Hepburn	
1514–1532	John Campbell (II.)	Scottish Gaelic: Eóin Caimbeul. Received papal provision but never paid for it, so had still not been confirmed when he resigned his right to Fearchar Mac Eachainn in 1528 and in 1532.
nom. 1529	James Stewart	The Abbot of Dryburgh, nominated unsuccessfully by the crown.
1528–1544 × 1546	Ferchar MacEachan	Scottish Gaelic: Fearchar Mac Eachainn, also recorded as Fearchar/Ferquhard "MacCachane" and "Hecotris".
1544–1552 × 1553	Roderick MacLean	Scottish Gaelic: Ruaidhri Mac Gill-Eathain.
1545–1546	Roderick MacAllister	Scottish Gaelic: Ruaidhri Mac Alasdair. Candidate of Domhnall Dubh.
1547	John Hay	Names occurs as "postulate of Sodor" in English source dating 1547. Nothing else known.
1547–1552	Patrick Maclean	Scottish Gaelic: Padraig Mac Gill-Eain.
1554–1559	Alexander Gordon	Nominal Archbishop of Athens.
1557–1560 × 1562	John Campbell (III.)	Scottish Gaelic: Eóin Caimbeul.
nom. 1564 × 1565	Patrick Maclean (again)	Scottish Gaelic: Padraig Mac Gill-Eathain. Transferred his nomination to Séon Carsuel in exchange for pension.
1565–1572	Séon Carsuel	Anglicised: John Carswell.
1567	Lachlan Maclean	Scottish Gaelic: Lachlann Mac Gill-Eathain. Obtained provision in secret from Mary, Queen of Scots. Transferred his rights to Carswell.
1572–1592 × 1594	John Campbell (III.) (again)	Scottish Gaelic: Eóin Caimbeul.
1605–1618 × 1619	Andrew Knox	Translated to Raphoe in 1610, but retained The Isles until 1618/19.
1619–1627 × 1628	Thomas Knox	
1628–1633	John Leslie	Translated to Raphoe.
1634–1638	Neil Campbell	Scottish Gaelic: Niall Caimbeul. Died between 1643 and 1647.
1638–1662	Episcopacy temporally abolished.	
1662–1669	Robert Wallace	Died in office.
1674–1676	James Ramsay	Translated from Dunblane on 28 July 1674. Translated back to Dunblane in April 1676.
1677–1680	Andrew Wood	Translated to Caithness in 1680.
1680–1689	Archibald Graham	
In 1689, the Episcopacy was abolished in the Church of Scotland.
