= Nicholas II (bishop of the Isles) =

Nicholas (died 1217), also known as Koli, was a thirteenth-century Bishop of the Isles.
