= Bernard de Linton =

Bernard de Linton (fl. 1296) was the parson of Mordington mentioned in the Ragman Rolls of 1296, where he is styled persone del Eglife de Mordington, del counte de Berewyk, "parson of the church of Mordington, in the county of Berwick". Nothing else is known of him. He is famous because between 1726 and the 20th century he was wrongly identified with Bernard, Abbot of Kilwinning, also mentioned in the Ragman Rolls, who was later Chancellor of Scotland, Abbot of Arbroath and Bishop of the Isles.
