= William de Deyn =

Scottish monk and cleric

William de Deyn [de la Deyn] (died 1350) was a 14th-century Scottish monk and cleric. Little can be said about Deyn's early life. He had obtained a licentiate in decrees at some point in his youth, and he must have become a Tironensian monk, for by 1329, and perhaps as early as 1327, he was Abbot of Kilwinning. Kilwinning Abbey was a Tironensian house in Cunninghame, in existence since the 1160s. He appears for the first time in this capacity as witness to a charter of Walter Comyn of Rowallan.

In 1344, Deyn, perhaps through Stewart patronage, was chosen to succeed Alexander de Kininmund as Bishop of Aberdeen. Deyn travelled to continental Europe, and by 27 September had received consecration. His consecration had been performed by Cardinal Peter Despres. In May 1345, the Pope appointed him as Scotland's papal tax collector, a duty Deyn fulfilled, sending the proceeds to the papacy via merchants in Bruges. He was one of the notables who petitioned the papacy in 1347 to legitimise the marriage of Robert Stewart and Elizabeth More of Rowallan. In 1349 he was in attendance with the Justiciar of Scotia holding court at the standing stones of Old Rayne in Garioch.

He died on 20 August 1350 and was buried in the choir of Aberdeen Cathedral.

Religious titles
Preceded by Adam	Abbot of Kilwinning; 1327 x 1329–1344	Succeeded by John de Dalgarno
Preceded by Alexander de Kininmund	Bishop of Aberdeen; 1344–1350	Succeeded by John de Rait
