= Bernard of Kilwinning =

Bernard
- Bishop of the Isles
- Church: Catholic Church
- See: Diocese of the Isles
- In office: 1327 x 1328–1331
- Predecessor: Gillebrìghde MacGilleFhaolain
- Successor: Thomas de Rossy
- Previous posts: Abbot of Kilwinning (x 1296–1296 x 1305); Chancellor of Scotland (1306 x 1308–1328); Abbot of Arbroath (1310–1328)

Orders
- Consecration: 26 June x 12 November 1328

Personal details
- Born: unknown uncertain
- Died: c. 1331 Buried in Kilwinning Abbey

Bernard (died c. 1331) was a Tironensian abbot, administrator and bishop active in late 13th- and early 14th-century Scotland, during the First War of Scottish Independence. He first appears in the records already established as Abbot of Kilwinning in 1296, disappearing for a decade before re-emerging as Chancellor of Scotland then Abbot of Arbroath.

A senior figure in the administration of Scotland during the 1310s and 1320s, he is widely said by modern writers to have drafted the Declaration of Arbroath, and although there is no direct evidence for this, he nevertheless probably played a role. By early 1328, his service to the king had earned him a bishopric – the bishopric of the Isles – a position he held for three or four years before his death in 1331.

== Abbot of Kilwinning ==
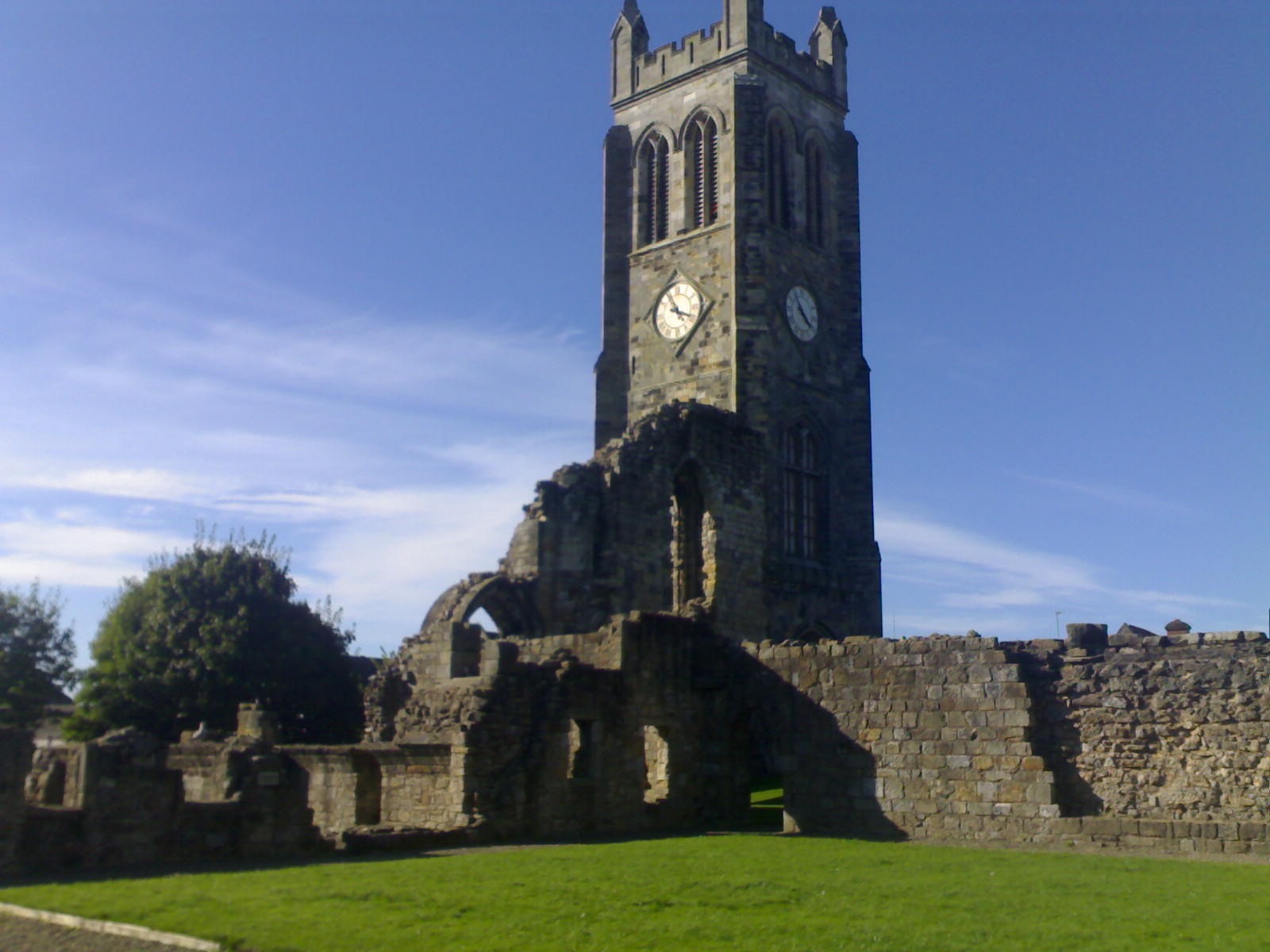
Kilwinning Abbey as it stands today.

The name "Bernard abbe de Kilwynin" (abbot of Kilwinning) occurs on the Ragman Rolls, 28 August 1296, and he is recorded again in a document of Melrose Abbey on 25 December. Bernard is unrecorded as abbot of Kilwinning after this year, but it is possible that he was ejected from Kilwinning Abbey by the English king in one of the following years, probably retiring to another Tironensian monastery, Arbroath Abbey. A document dated 1296 x 1305, names one otherwise unknown Roger as Abbot of Kilwinning, meaning that Bernard had ceased to hold this position by 1305 at the latest.

Although once regarded as a historical dead-end, it is now established that this Bernard was the same Tironensian who was later Chancellor of Scotland, Abbot of Arbroath and Bishop of the Isles. Since 1726, Bernard had been erroneously identified with Bernard de Linton, parson of Mordington, a name which occurs only in the Ragman Rolls. Professor A. A. M. Duncan first argued that Bernard of Arbroath was the same as Bernard of Kilwinning, rather than Bernard de Linton, in 1988, and has since been accepted by other historians.

== Chancellor of Scotland & Abbot of Arbroath ==
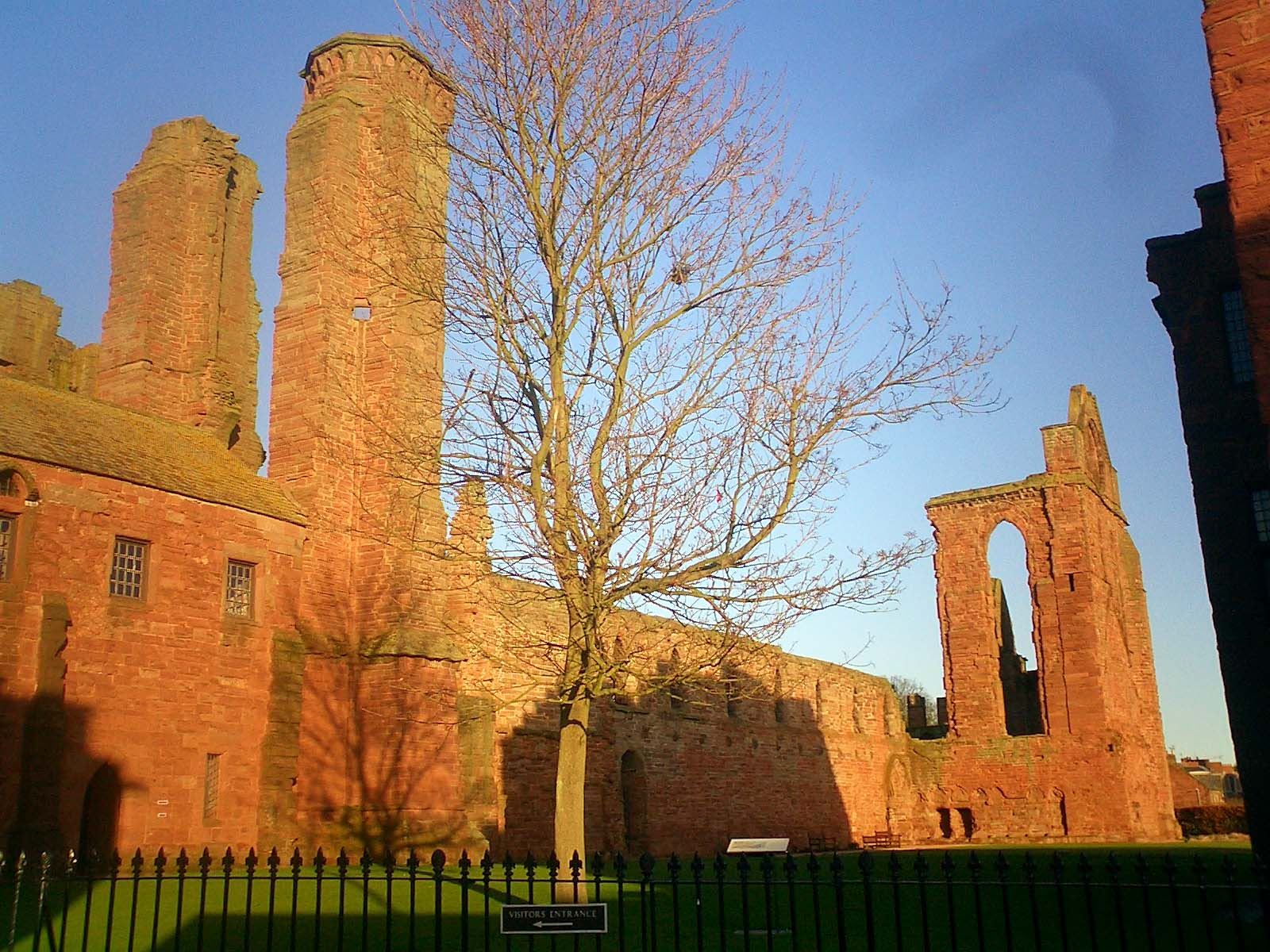
A modern photograph of Arbroath Abbey, showing distinctive sandstone colouring.

From 1308, Bernard appears in the charters of Robert I, King of the Scots, as "Dom Bernard the Chancellor". It was in 1308 that Robert finally got full control over the province of Angus, where Arbroath Abbey is located. The Abbot of Arbroath at the time, John de Angus, appears to have been an English appointee, and was subsequently ejected from office. On 1 November 1309, John de Angus was "released" from the responsibility of his office by the Bishop of St Andrews, though he retained Haltwhistle as rector, a parish church in Tynedale, Northumberland, which belonged to the abbey.

Bernard was elected as the new abbot sometime in 1310, probably by August. John de Angus continued to be styled "Abbot of Arbroath" in English sources, though he became a Scottish prisoner in 1312 and was holding Haltwhistle from the Bishop of Durham by 1313. After his blessing as abbot, Bernard traveled to the Kingdom of Norway to negotiate an agreement with the Norwegian king. He returned in February 1312, and on 29 October 1312 Norwegian ambassadors met King Robert at Inverness in royal Moray, and agreed to the Treaty of Inverness. The treaty involved a renewal of the Treaty of Perth, and resolution of earlier tit-for-tat acts of hostility against each other, like the seizing of goods from Scottish merchants in Norway and the kidnapping by the Scots of the Steward of Orkney.

The fifteenth-century Lowland Scottish chronicler Walter Bower attributed to Abbot Bernard a poem in Latin about the Battle of Bannockburn, from which Bower quoted many lines. It may however have come from another Arbroath monk, as Bower appears to hint elsewhere. Bernard has been widely credited since the eighteenth century as the author of the Declaration of Arbroath, a document from his period as Abbot of Arbroath. Professor A. A. M. Duncan doubts this however, arguing that "the skilled use of the papal cursus in that text points rather to a professional rhetorician". Professor G. W. S. Barrow thought that Alexander de Kininmund (Kinninmonth) was a more likely candidate, on similar reasoning to Duncan.

Bernard's name was certainly on the Declaration of Arbroath, and as chancellor he certainly had some role. He held this administrative office throughout his time as Abbot of Arbroath, until his election as Bishop of the Isles by 1328. He would have had a significant role in royal government and the issue of charters, and many royal acts are dated by Bernard's whereabouts. His role as chancellor appears to have been used for the benefit of his abbey with nine of the sixteen royal charters extant from the period 1312–3 having the abbey as the beneficiary.

== Bishop of the Isles ==
The years of service offered by Bernard were rewarded in the winter of 1327/8, when he was advanced to the bishopric of the Isles, a bishopric King Robert had reserved for his own patronage back in 1324. This election likely occurred between 9 November 1327 and 14 January 1328. The office of chancellor, and the accompanying salary of 200 marks, was resigned by Bernard later in the year, probably on 3 April 1328. King Robert assigned Bernard £100 towards the expenses of his election, and was granted the grain tithes from the lands of the church of Abernethy, for seven years, to complement the meagre income of the diocese of the Isles.

He was consecrated between 26 June and 12 November 1328, perhaps in Norway, where the see's metropolitan, the Archbishop of Trondheim, resided. Bernard's election was not straightforward, as some the "canons of Snizort", the seat of the diocese, had elected a different successor, Cormac Cormacii. Cormac's representatives were in Bergen in July 1331, and persuaded the Archbishop of Trondheim to order an examination of the election. They were ultimately unsuccessful, as no confirmation is attested. Despite this success, Bernard's episcopate was not long-lasting, as he had died by 10 June 1331. Although the last notice of Bernard in any contemporary document dates to 1328, it is very likely he died in 1331, as the Chronicles of Mann said he was bishop during four different years. The Chronicles of Mann further notes that he was buried at Kilwinning Abbey, his original monastery and the location where he first rose through the ranks.

== Notes ==
Religious titles
Preceded by John	Abbot of Kilwinning x 1296–1296 x 1305	Succeeded by Roger
Preceded by John de Angus	Abbot of Arbroath; 1310–1328	Succeeded by Geoffrey
Preceded by Gillebrìghde MacGilleFhaolain	Bishop of the Isles; 1327 x 1328–1331	Succeeded by Thomas de Rossy
Government offices
Preceded by Nicholas de Balmyle	Chancellor of Scotland; 1306 x 1308–1328	Succeeded by Walter de Twynham
