= William Russell (bishop of Sodor) =

- Bishop of Mann and the Isles
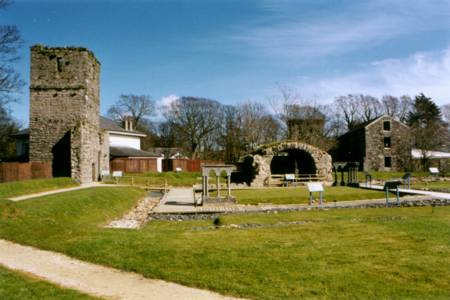
- The ruins of Rushen Abbey today
- Church: Roman Catholic Church
- See: Diocese of Mann and the Isles
- In office: 1348 x 1349–1374
- Predecessor: Thomas de Rossy
- Successor: John Donkan
- Previous post(s): Abbot of Rushen (1330x1331–1349)

Orders
- Consecration: 27 April x 6 May 1349 by Bertrand du Pouget

Personal details
- Born: Unknown; Mann
- Died: 21 April 1374; Westmorland, England

William Russell (died 1374) was a Cistercian prelate who appears to have been a monk at Rushen Abbey on the Isle of Man (Mann), ascending to the rank of abbot there, before his election as Bishop of Mann and Bishop of the Isles (Sodor). After traveling to Continental Europe for confirmation and consecration, avoiding a trip to the metropolitan in Norway, he returned to the Irish Sea as a legal bishop. During his episcopate, he was active in England and oversaw the promulgation of several provincial statutes.

== Abbot of Rushen and election ==
A native of Mann, an island in the Irish Sea south of Galloway in Scotland, for 18 years Russell was the abbot of Rushen Abbey. In either 1348 or 1349 he was elected Bishop of Mann and the Isles. Papal letters reveal that the see had recently been made vacant by the death of Thomas de Rossy, and that the clergy of the diocese had elected William unanimously as the new bishop; they also reveal that Russell had had to obtain permission from the abbot at Rushen Abbey's mother-house, Furness Abbey.

== Provision and consecration ==
For notice of the election, the Manx Chronicle related the following:

William Russell, a Manxman, abbot of the monastery of St. Mary of Rushen, was elected pastor of the Sodor diocese, by the clergy of the island of Mann, in the cathedral church of St. German, in Holm of Mann, and was consecrated at Avignon by Pope Clement VI. He was the first Sodor bishop-elect consecrated and confirmed by the Apostolic see; for all his predecessors had been wont to be confirmed and consecrated by the Archbishop of Trondheim, that is the metropolitan.

Although the Chronicle says 1348, it is thought by some to refer to 1349. Pope Clement VI provided him on 27 April 1349 and he was consecrated by May 6, by Bertrand du Pouget, Cardinal-bishop of Ostia. He was neither, as the Chronicle claimed the first Bishop of the Isles to be provided by the Pope himself, nor was he consecrated by the pope directly.

Pope Clement wrote letters informing of Russell's appointment to Arne, Archbishop of Trondheim, William de Monteacuto, Lord of Mann, Robert Stewart, Lord of Bute and Steward (senescallus) of Scotland, and John of Islay, Lord of the Isles, and it was from these that the details of the election are known. The pope granted him exemption from any trip to Trondheim to pay obedience to the Archbishop of Trondheim. Clement made it clear that the bishopric of the Isles was still subject to Trondheim, and Russell must send a proctor to Norway to obey on his behalf. Russell was also granted a loan of 1200 gold florins to cover his expenses, as the diocese was one of the poorest in the Catholic Church.

== Bishop of the Isles ==
On 23 February 1351 Bishop Russell held a provincial synod at Kirkmichael on the Isle of Man. A number of provincial statutes are attributed to this synod, including a requirement to teach the laity the apostolic creed in the Gaelic language. In 1362, Russell complained to Pope Urban V that his cathedral on Mann had been occupied as a fortress by the Lord of Mann, and petitioned the pope to order that de Monteacuto restore the cathedral to the control of the clergy; the same letter also complained that, because of wars [between the Scots and the English], there were not enough men literate [in Latin] to fill benefices, and so Russell requested permission to ordain eight illiterates to priesthood. On 7 December 1367 Pope Urban wrote to the bishop regarding the wish of William de Monteacuto, Earl of Salisbury and Lord of Mann, to found a Franciscan house on Mann.

Russell was active in England during his episcopate. For instance, on 11 December 1351, the Archbishop of York, William Zouche, granted William commission to confer orders in the diocese of York, a commission that was renewed on 21 October 1353 by Zouche's successor John de Thoresby. Indeed, it was in England that Russell died. The Manx Chronicle reported his death as follows:

He died on the 21st day of the month of April 1376, at Ramsheved, and was buried in the monastery of St. Mary of Furness. He was abbot of Rushen eighteen years, and bishop of the Sodor diocese twenty-six.

Ramsheved is Ramshead, near Bolton-le-Sands in Westmorland, Lancashire; the "monastery of St Mary of Furness" refers to Furness Abbey in Cumbria; the date the Chronicle meant was 21 April 1374.

== Notes ==
Religious titles
Preceded by Thomas de Rossy	Bishop of the Isles; 1348 x 1349–1374	Succeeded by John Donkan
