= Thomas de Rossy (bishop of the Isles) =

Scottish prelate

- Bishop of Mann and the Isles
- Church: Roman Catholic Church
- See: Diocese of Mann and the Isles
- In office: 1331–1348
- Predecessor: Bernard
- Successor: William Russell
- Previous post(s): Canon of Dunkeld

Orders
- Consecration: 7 June x 10 June 1331

Personal details
- Born: Unknown; Scotland
- Died: 20 September 1348; Unknown

Thomas de Rossy (died 1348) was a fourteenth-century Scottish prelate. He appears in the historical record for the first time in 1331, when Pope John XXII provided him to succeed Bernard as Bishop of the Isles. At this stage, the papal sources name him as a canon of Dunkeld Cathedral.

Probably while at the papal curia, he was consecrated at some point between 7 and 10 June 1331. The Chronicles of Mann states that Thomas de Rossy "was the first to exact from the churches of Mann twenty shillings for visitation dues", and that "he was also the first who exacted from the parochial rectors the tithes received by them from strangers engaged in the herring fishery". His surname is known from a papal record dating to 1346, a record concerning the future of a benefice Thomas held before he was promoted to episcopal status.

According to the Chronicle, after an episcopate of eighteen years, he died on 20 September 1348 and was buried at Scone.

== Notes ==
Religious titles
Preceded by Bernard	Bishop of the Isles; 1331–1348	Succeeded by William Russell
