= Piel Castle =

Grade I listed building in Cumbria, UK

- Furness Peninsula, England
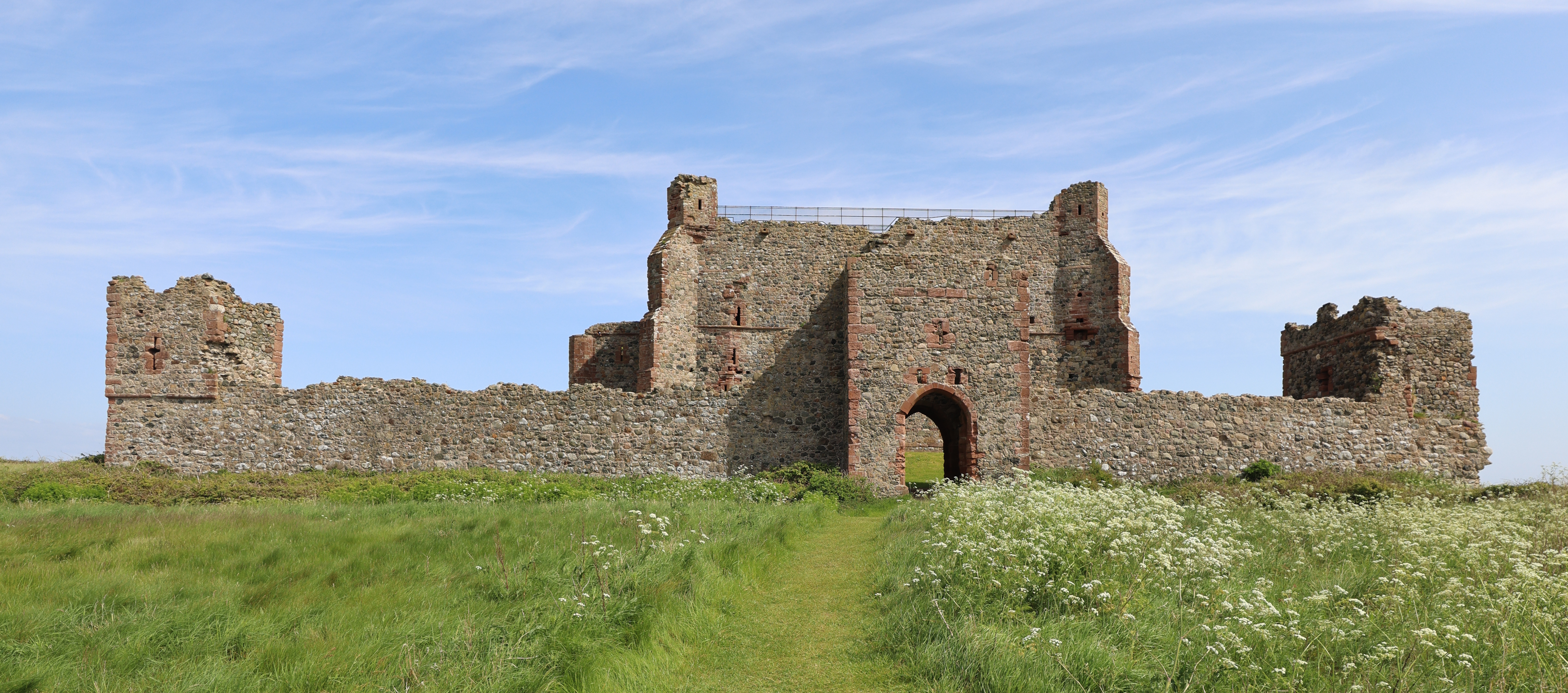
- Piel Castle, showing the inner gatehouse, inner bailey wall and keep

Site information
- Type: Concentric castle
- Owner: English Heritage
- Open to the public: Yes
- Condition: Ruined

Location
- Location in Barrow-in-Furness Borough Location in Cumbria
- Coordinates: 54.0626°N 3.1733°W
- Grid reference: grid reference SD233636

Site history
- Materials: Beach stone and red sandstone
- Events: Landing of Lambert Simnel in 1487

Piel Castle, also known as Fouldry Castle or the Pile of Fouldray, is a castle situated on the south-eastern point of Piel Island, off the coast of the Furness Peninsula in north-west England. Built in the early-14th century by John Cockerham, the Abbot of neighbouring Furness Abbey, it was intended to oversee the trade through the local harbour and to protect against Scottish raids. The castle was built using stones from the local beach, and featured a large keep with surrounding inner and outer baileys. It was used as a base by the Yorkist pretender Lambert Simnel in 1487, but by 1534 it had fallen into ruin and passed into the hands of the Crown.

Sea erosion began to cause significant damage to the castle in the early 19th century. In the 1870s the castle's owner, the Duke of Buccleuch, carried out extensive restoration work and erected outworks to protect it against further damage from the sea. In 1920 the castle was given to the town of Barrow-in-Furness and is now in the care of English Heritage. The castle is at threat from continued coastal erosion.

== History ==
Piel Castle was built on Piel Island, overlooking the deep water port of Piel Harbour outside of Barrow Haven, now called Barrow-in-Furness. There may have been an earlier 12th-century fortification on the island, possibly built by the local monks in the reign of King Stephen, but this is uncertain. (Note: The suggestion of a 12th-century fortification on the site comes from a reference in a 1404 inquiry, stating that the endowment of the abbey was dependent on maintaining a castle there. The foundation charters for the abbey, however, do not contain such a clause.) The castle was built by John Cockerham, the Abbot of Furness Abbey around 1327, when Edward III gave the abbey a licence to crenellate on the site. Comprising a keep with an inner and outer bailey, the castle was intended to oversee the trade through the harbour, and to provide defence, as the Abbey had faced raids from Scotland in 1316 and 1322.

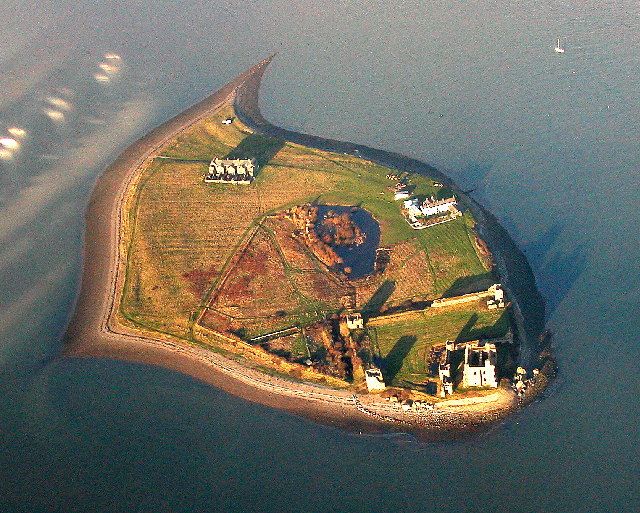
Piel Castle and the surrounding island, showing the keep (lower right) and the inner and outer baileys

Architectural historian Anthony Emery argues that the castle was built in three phases, starting with the central keep, which he believes was intended as a largely unfortified summer residence for the Abbot. With the increased threat from Scotland and the granting of the licence to crenellate, Emery suggests that the inner bailey wall was then constructed to better defend the keep, followed by the outer bailey wall in a final phase of work.

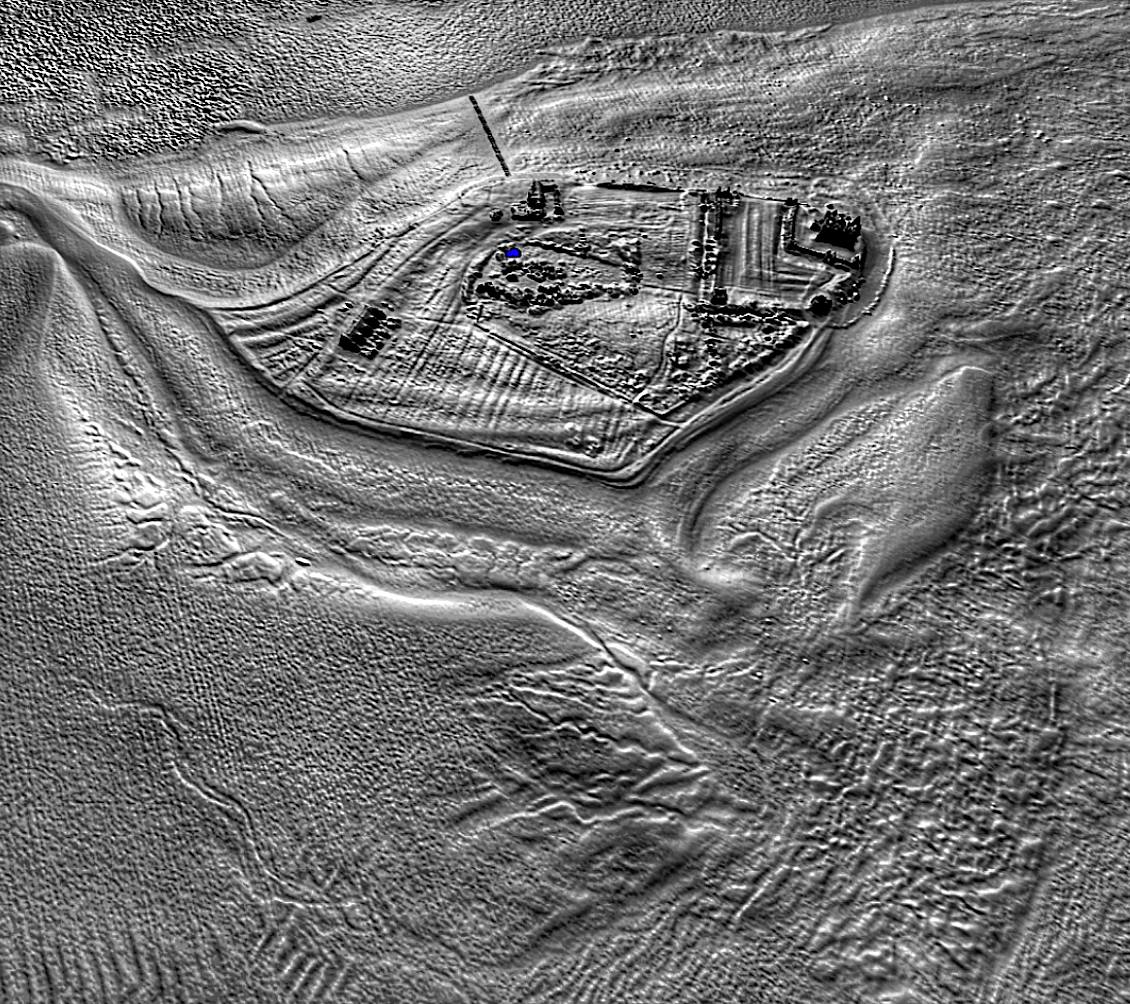
A lidar view of Piel Castle.

In 1408, the Abbot John Bolton decided that the cost of maintaining the castle was excessive, and attempted to pull down the defences, but was prevented from doing so by Henry IV; this was followed by a period of rebuilding around 1429. The castle was used for smuggling by the Abbey, leading to complaints from merchants in English-controlled Calais that they were illegally trafficking wool, which in this period could only legally be sold through the French port. In 1487 the Yorkist pretender Lambert Simnel landed on Piel Island. He sought help from potential local supporters and held court at the castle, before advancing inland and ultimately being defeated at the Battle of Stoke Field. By 1534 the castle had fallen in ruin and was described in a report as "sore decayed". In 1537, on the dissolution of the Abbey, it became the property of the Crown, and after 1660, was given to the Duke of Albemarle.

By the late 18th century, the island had become used as a base for maritime pilots, and the castle passed into the possession of the Dukes of Buccleuch. In 1811, the poet William Wordsworth visited the area and wrote a poem entitled "Peele Castle" describing the site. (Note: William Wordsworth's poem spelled Piel Castle as "Peele Castle," leading to occasional confusion with Peel Castle, located on the Isle of Man.) The sea caused significant erosion during this period, and one side of the keep collapsed in the early 19th century. Walter Scott, the Duke of Buccleuch, purchased the rest of the island and carried out an extensive and expensive restoration of the castle between 1877 and 1878, destroying most traces of the medieval occupation of the site in the process. The restoration involved constructing outworks to prevent further sea erosion, replacing damage to the ashlar stone features of the castle and protecting the tops of the stone walls.

=== Conservation and investigation ===
In 1919 John Scott decided to sell the island and castle; the local mayor, Alfred Barrow, intervened and the following the year the Duke instead agreed to give the castle and island to the local authorities as a memorial to those who had lost their life in World War I. The castle passed into the care of central government in 1973, and is now controlled by English Heritage, who operate the site as a tourist attraction. An archaeological survey was commissioned by English Heritage in 1984, carried out by Rachel Newman of Lancaster University; the findings of the survey led to a program of restoration work, completed in 1991. It is protected by law as a grade I listed building.

By 2022, much of the low-lying island the castle sits on has been lost to the sea, and the keep of Piel Castle itself is at risk of destruction due to coastal erosion worsened by climate change. In response, English Heritage launched a fundraising campaign in September 2022 to protect and strengthen Piel Castle (and five other at-risk castles).

== Architecture ==
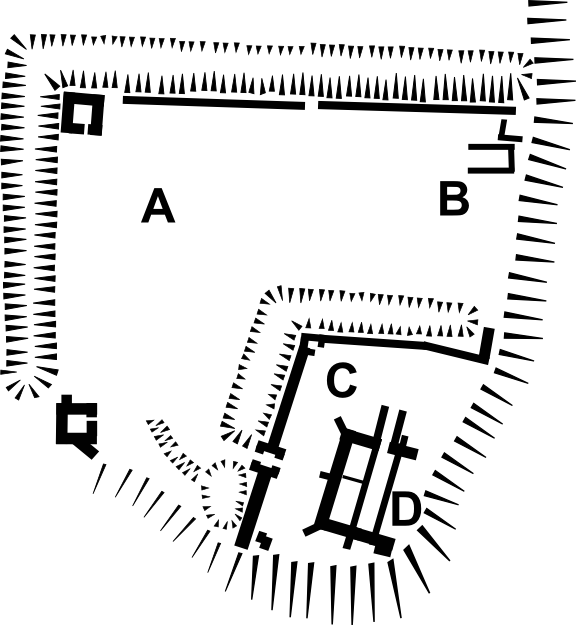
Plan of Piel Castle; A - outer bailey; B - chapel; C - inner bailey; D - keep

The castle is built to an Edwardian concentric design, with a keep in the south-eastern corner, protected by an inner and outer bailey with stone curtain walls extending out to the north-west. The castle is built using stones from the local beach bonded with a liquid mortar, with the finer stonework, such as the doorways and windows, made from red ashlar sandstone imported from the mainland. Much of the surrounding island has been eroded by the sea and some of the castle has been lost, with fallen stone fragments still visible on the beach below.

The three-storey keep stands on a low mound of clay, similar to that making up the base of the rest of the castle, and is 45-foot (14 m) high, 76 feet (23 m) by 74 feet (23 m) across, reinforced with protruding buttresses, and a tower on the south-eastern corner. The original entrance would have been at ground level, but a gatehouse, 25 feet (7.6 m) by 16 feet (4.9 m), was then built along on the north side, raising this to the first floor. A carved female figure can be seen above the entrance arch, which may have been a representation of Salome. The keep had large windows on the first and second floors, although the lower level of these was later blocked up, and was unusually divided into three sections, creating a central hallway on each level. The eastern side of the keep has collapsed as a consequence of land erosion. Anthony Emery argues that the term "keep" is inappropriate for the building, which should be seen more as a residential tower house, similar to that at Langley Castle.

The inner and outer bailey walls have also been damaged by sea erosion, but they originally formed concentric squares around the keep and were protected by ditches. The outer bailey wall, 8-foot (2.4 m) thick in places, is no longer very substantial, but even when first built it may have been quite weak; it is protected by a moat, up to 13 metres (43 ft) wide and 3 metres (9.8 ft) deep. Both the baileys are protected by towers; the outer bailey towers are each 15.5-foot (4.7 m) wide. The inner bailey wall is 8-foot (2.4 m) thick, protected by a 25-foot (7.6 m) wide moat. Its towers were a later addition to the original design, and a gatehouse in the inner bailey wall was also built shortly after the construction of the castle. The fortifications would have been slightly old fashioned for the period. The outer bailey holds a stone building called "the chapel," 31 feet (9.4 m) by 15 feet (4.6 m) in size. Its original use is unknown and it appears to have been built late in the castle's history, possibly after it became ruinous.

Local legends exist of a tunnel between the castle and Furness Abbey, allegedly used by the monks as escape route from the mainland. No such passageway exists.

== In the arts and literature ==
William Wordsworth's poem "Peele Castle" is recorded under History above.

A poetic illustration by Letitia Elizabeth Landon, in which she refers to the castle's 'half-forgotten name', is to an engraving of a painting by G. Pickering entitled "Pile of Fouldrey Castle". This was published in Fisher's Drawing Room Scrap Book, 1832.

== See also ==
- Castles in Great Britain and Ireland
- List of castles in England
- List of English Heritage properties

== Bibliography ==
- Berry, Oliver (2009). The Lake District. London, UK: Lonely Planet Publications. ISBN 9781741790917.
- Emery, Anthony (1996). Greater Medieval Houses of England and Wales, 1300-1500. Vol. 1. Cambridge, UK: Cambridge University Press. ISBN 9780521497237.
- Mackenzie, James D. (1896). The Castles of England: Their Story and Structure. Vol. 2. New York, US: Macmillan. OCLC 504892038.
- Newman, R. (1986). "Piel Castle Survey and Excavations 1983-1985" (PDF). Contrebis. 12: 64–67.
- Pettifer, Adrian (2002). English Castles: A Guide by Counties. Woodbridge, UK: Boydell Press. ISBN 978-0-85115-782-5.
- Raymond, Michael David (2009). John Wordsworth on Snowdon: The Elegiac Sublime and the Spectacle of Woe (PhD). Fordham University, New York. OCLC 727840175.
- Rose, Lesley Anne (2008a). The Lake District. Richmond, UK: Crimson Publishing. ISBN 978-1-85458-425-0.
- Rose, Susan (2008b). Calais: An English Town in France, 1347-1558. Woodbridge, UK: Boydell Press. ISBN 9781843834014.
- Wood, Jason (1992–93). "Six Northern Castles - A Review of Recent Work Undertaken by the Lancaster University Archaeological Unit" (PDF). Castle Studies Group Newsletter (6): 18–21.
