= Furness Abbey =

Ruined abbey in Cumbria, England

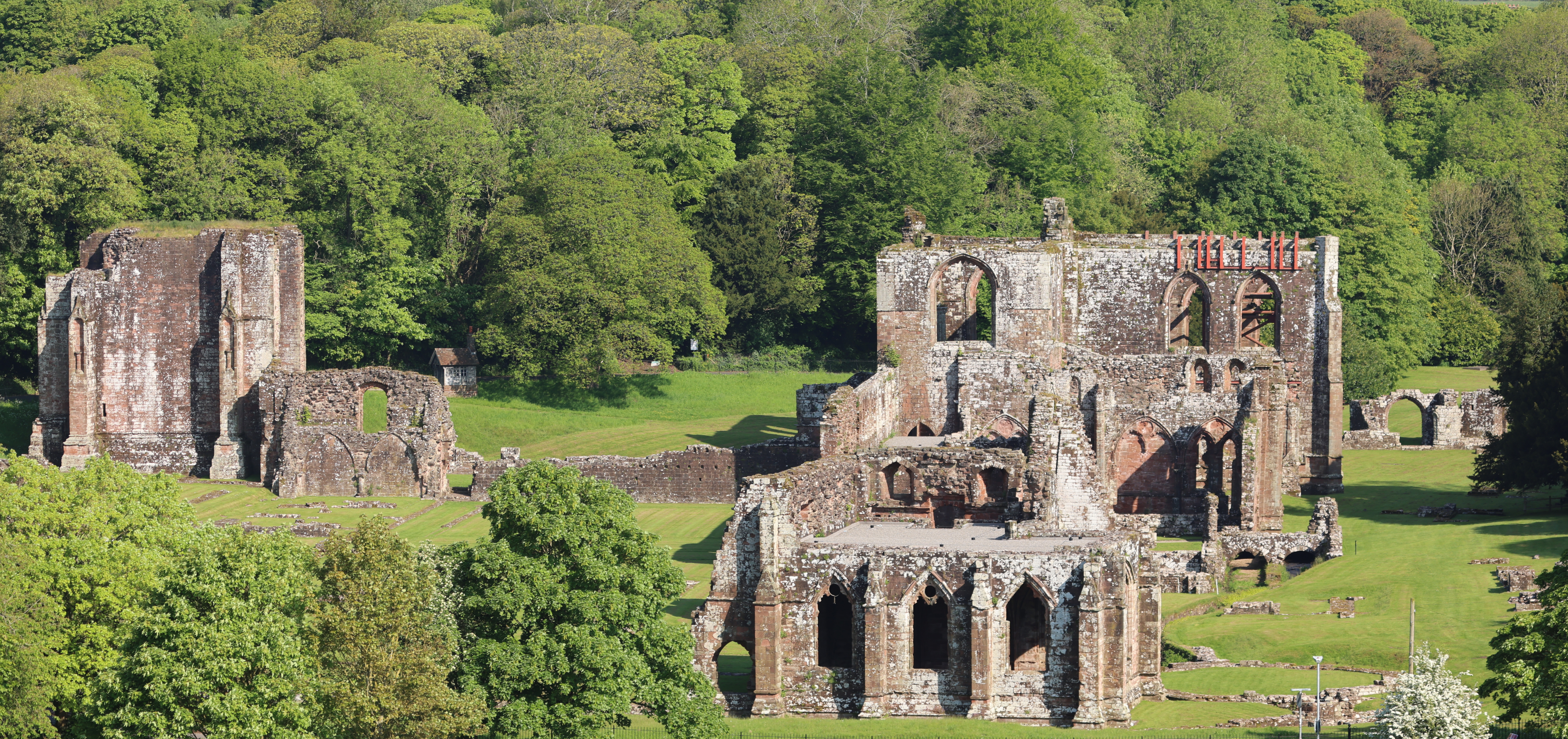
- The abbey in August 2007

- Location within the former Borough of Barrow-in-Furness

Monastery information
- Other name: St. Mary of Furness
- Order: Cistercian
- Established: 1123
- Disestablished: 1537
- Mother house: Congregation of Savigny
- Controlled churches: Byland Abbey; Calder Abbey; Inch Abbey; Rushen Abbey; Swineshead Abbey

People
- Founder: Stephen, Count of Blois

Site
- Location: The Vale of Nightshade, Newbarns, Barrow-in-Furness, Cumbria, England
- Coordinates: 54°8′7″N 3°11′52″W
- Public access: Yes (English Heritage)

Furness Abbey, or St. Mary of Furness, is a former monastery located to the north of Barrow-in-Furness, Cumbria, England. The abbey dates back to 1123 and was once the second-wealthiest and most powerful Cistercian monastery in the country, behind Fountains Abbey, prior to its dissolution during the English Reformation. The abbey contains a number of individual Grade I Listed Buildings and is a Scheduled Monument.

== History of the abbey ==
=== Early history ===
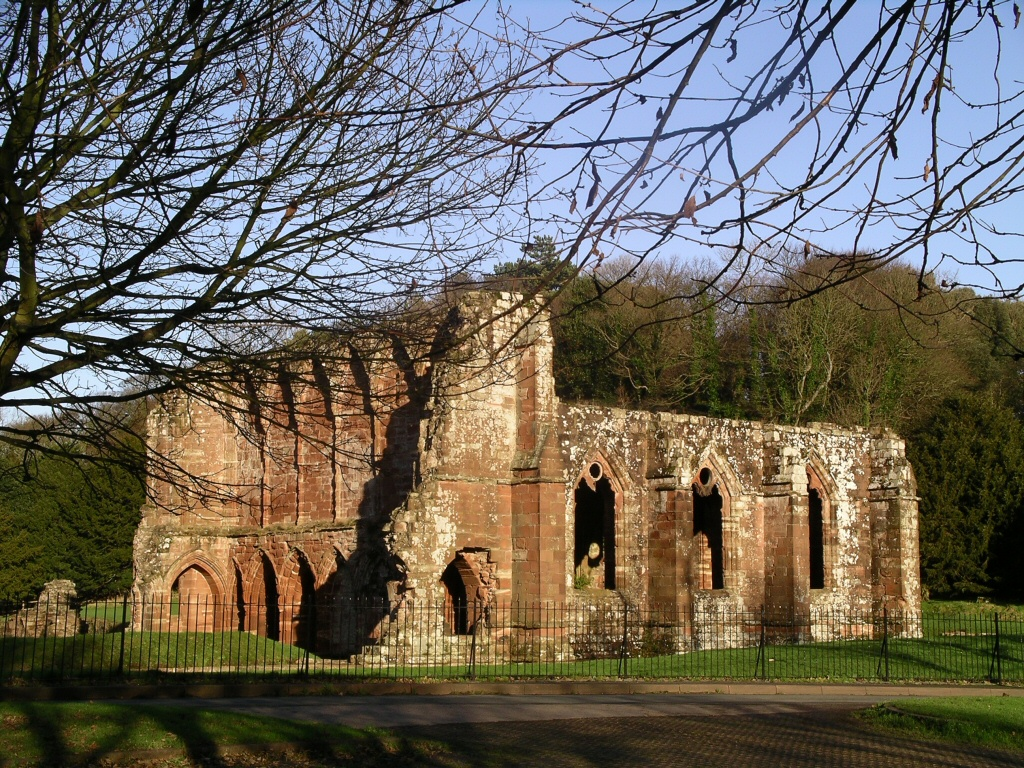
Ruins of the abbey's former infirmary

Founded in 1123 by Stephen, Count of Boulogne, it was built originally for the Order of Savigny. The site originally chosen was at Tulketh on the banks of the River Ribble but after three years the monks found the site to be unsuitable and moved to Furness. Located in the 'Vale of Nightshade', south of Dalton-in-Furness, the abbey is built entirely out of local sandstone. It passed in 1147 to the Cistercians, who gradually enlarged and rebuilt the original ornate church. The majority of the current ruins date from the 12th and 13th centuries. By the 15th century, it had been completely remodelled and had become the second richest and most powerful – as well as one of the grandest – Cistercian abbeys in England, behind Fountains Abbey. The Gothic-style monastery and its adjacent structures cover an expansive area of land and reach a maximum height of 40 metres (131 ft) . In around 1246, Abbot Laurence Acclorne died in suspicious circumstances, possibly murdered by three monks poisoning his communion chalice.

The monks of the abbey were large landowners, and the most powerful body in what was then a remote border territory. In particular, they were heavily influential on the Isle of Man. One of the kings of Mann and the Isles is buried at the abbey, as are many of the Bishops of Sodor and Man. Rushen Abbey on the Isle of Man was built on land owned by the monks. They also owned mines on the island, and built Piel Castle to control trade between the Furness Peninsula and the Isle of Man.

Being about 70 miles down the coast from Scotland, the monks occasionally found themselves in between the frequently warring Scots and English. The abbey was sacked in 1316 by Robert the Bruce, and had to be abandoned for two years. When Robert the Bruce invaded England again, during The Great Raid of 1322, the abbot paid to lodge and support him, rather than risk losing the wealth and power of the abbey. However, the monks guarded themselves against future attacks by fortifying the castle of Piel Island in 1327 to defend the abbey's harbour. The abbey's trouble were compounded by the Black Death in 1349, which probably killed the majority of the monks.

Furness abbey remained wealthy into the 16th century, with the west tower under construction on the eve on the Reformation. However, it was mismanaged, with the high-handed, duplicitous and bullying rule of Abbot Alexander Banke leaded to the abbey being raided by Earl of Derby in 1514. However, his favour with the king led to his restoration to the abbacy two years later. Several Furness monks were enthusiastic in their support of the Pilgrimage of Grace, which aimed to prevent Henry VIII's Dissolution of the Monasteries, and were executed. Abbot Alexander Pyle wisely surrendered the abbey in spring 1537, making it the first of the wealthier houses to fall.

=== Post-Reformation history ===
The abbey buildings were quickly demolished, with the royal commissioners beginning work before the monks had even left. Some of the outbuildings were converted into a manor house, but by the 18th century this had descended to farm status, while the massive ruins became a favourite of Romantic tourists. William Wordsworth visited several times and referred to it in his 1805 autobiographical poem The Prelude, whilst J. M. W. Turner made numerous etchings of the abbey. Queen Victoria and her lady in waiting Augusta Stanley are known to have visited in 1848 based on the diaries of the latter. Other notable tourists include the Roosevelt family. A young Theodore Roosevelt and his siblings played on the ruins, which, in 1869, were not roped off or restricted. In 1896, while touring industrial Northern England, Chinese statesman Li Hongzhang visited the abbey site. Viceroy Li stayed longer than expected, so that his schedule had to be rearranged. The ruins were handed over to state care in 1923.

== Conservation and protection ==
The Furness Abbey complex is a Scheduled Monument and Conservation Area containing five Grade I listed buildings and structures. Restoration work took place between 2008 and 2017 amid fears that part of the abbey could have collapsed.

== Burials ==
- William de Mowbray
- William Russell, former Bishop of Mann and the Isles
- Rǫgnvaldr Guðrøðarson
- Rǫgnvaldr Óláfsson

== Remains ==
The red sandstone ruins of the abbey are impressive and extensive. Of the cruciform church, the late 12th century transepts, a fine example of Cistercian early Gothic architecture, and the 15th century Perpendicular Gothic presbytery still stand to the wallhead. The night stairs door remains in the south transept. The presbytery retains an elaborate sedilia. The crossing piers and some fragments of carved stone in the transepts survive from the Savignac church, which had an apsidal east end. The nave has largely been reduced to foundation level, but enough survives to show that it alternated circular and eight-shafted piers, unusually for a Cistercian church. The lower part of the 16th century west tower remains - in appearance it would have been like that built by Abbot Marmaduke Huby at Fountains.

The south and west ranges of the cloister, which contained the warming room, refectory, cellars and lay brothers' accommodation, have largely been reduced to their foundations. The east range, however, is well-preserved. The first floor housed the dormitory, and lancet windows survive. The ground floor has an imposing run of five round-headed arches facing the cloister. These gave access to two book cupboards, the chapter house, the slype and the day room. The 13th century chapter house has a vaulted vestibule opening into an elaborate room with paired lancets and blind tracery, formerly vaulted. To the east of the dormitory was the reredorter. Its drain is still water-filled.

In the late 13th century, a grand infirmary was built to the south of the main complex. Its east end survives, with a vaulted chapel and buttery. These have unusual near-triangular arches, similar to those in Goodrich Castle and Hereford Cathedral. An angled passage connected the buttery to an octagonal kitchen. To the east of the complex stood the abbot's house. This was remodelled from a 13th-century structure, possibly an earlier infirmary, and was expanded in the later Middle Ages, rising over arches to join further rooms at the top of the cliff. To the north of the church were the monks' cemetery, with a gatehouse, and the guest house. The latter was replaced by a set of stables after the Dissolution.

Farther afield, remains survive of much of the precinct wall, with three gatehouses. There are also a capella ante portas, a mill and Bow Bridge, a medieval bridge.

== Folklore and mythology ==
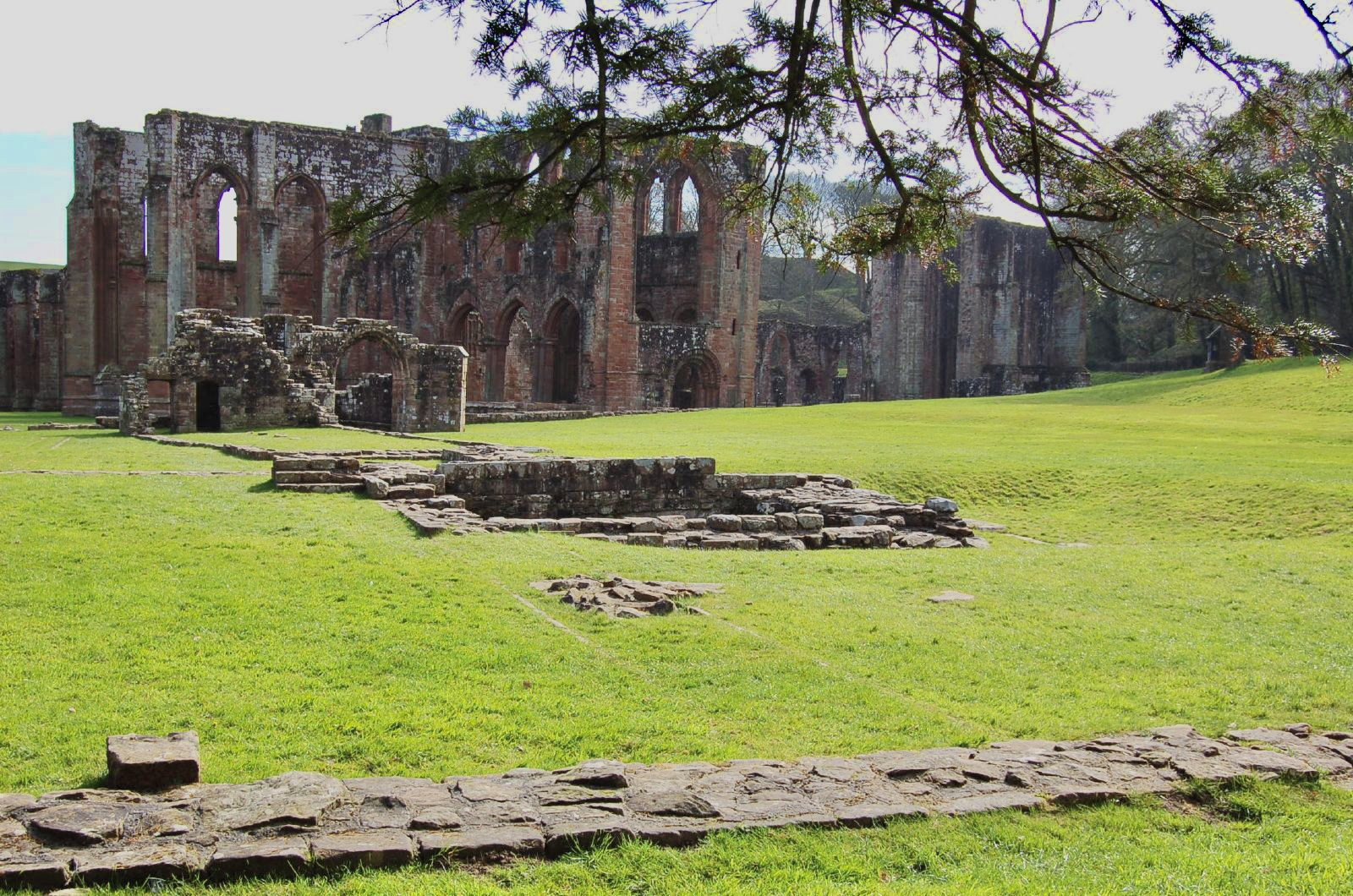
View looking across the former guesthouse towards the Cemetery Gatehouse and main church building

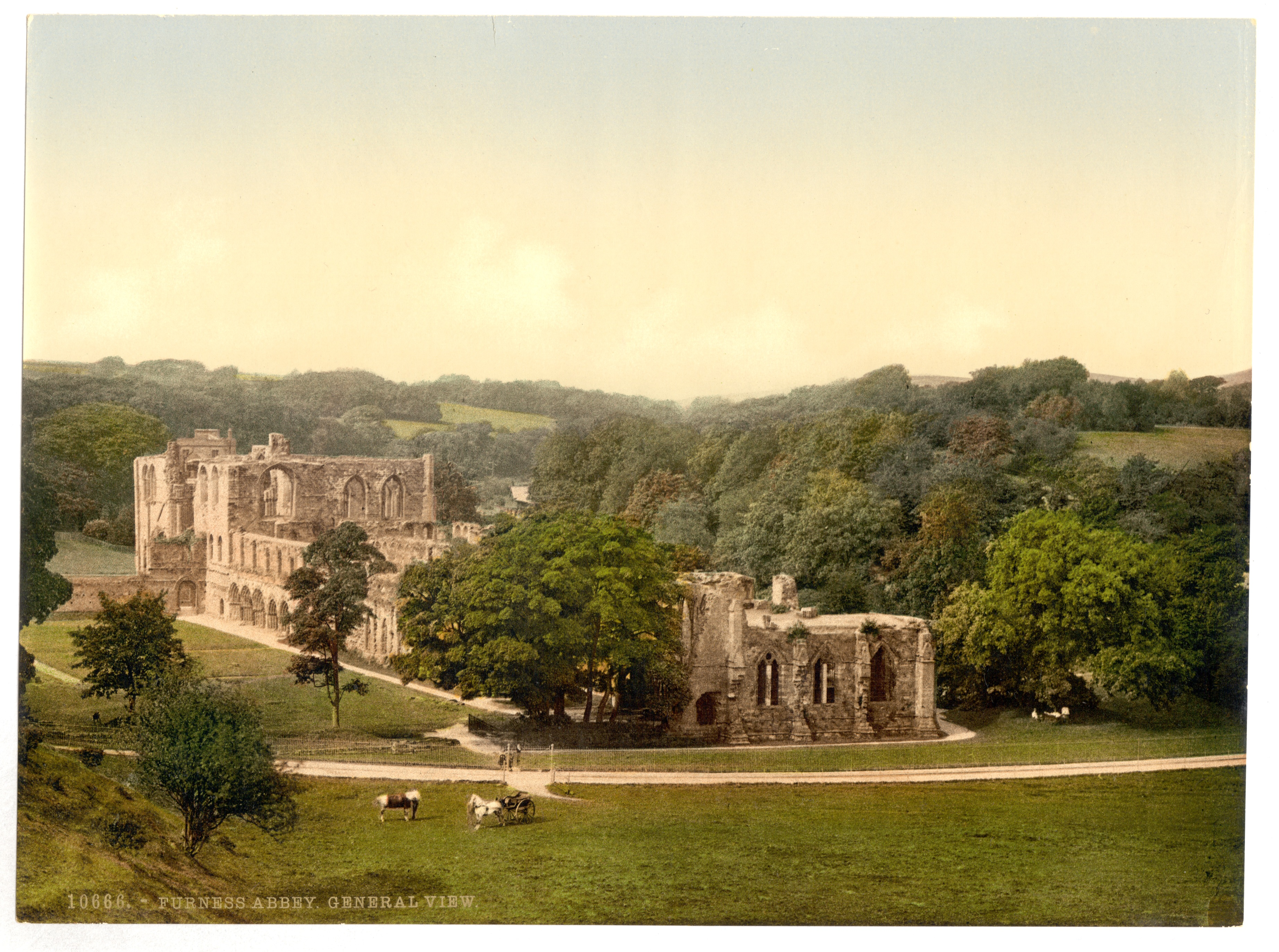
The ruins of Furness Abbey seen from the south in the 1890s

There are many stories claiming that Furness Abbey is haunted. There are supposedly at least three ghosts which are alleged to have been seen numerous times at the Abbey. First, it is said that the spirit of a monk has been seen climbing a staircase and also possibly walking towards the gatehouse before vanishing into a wall. Another sighting is that of a squire's daughter. She was known to meet her lover at the ruined abbey after the Reformation, although one day her partner took a journey out to sea from which he never returned. It is said that the girl went back to the Abbey every day until her death to the site she and her partner once loved; the track she walked is today still known as "My Lady's Walk." There have also been many sightings of a white lady, although due to possible conflicting stories, it is unclear whether the White Lady and the ghost of the squire's daughter are of the same person or not. Possibly the most famous ghost of Furness Abbey is a headless monk on horseback, who rides underneath the sandstone arch near the Abbey Tavern; the death of this individual is linked to an invasion by the Scots in 1316.

A tunnel is said to run underneath the Abbey to both Piel Castle (particularly implausible, as this would have to run under Morecambe Bay) and Dalton Castle, allowing the monks to receive supplies and keep watch upon the local settlements. It has also been rumoured that the Holy Grail and King John's missing jewels are hidden somewhere inside the 'Ley tunnel'. Such tunnel stories are common to many medieval buildings, due to the presence of partially-buried drains. At Furness, there are two main drains, running east and west of the main buildings.

== Mystery plays ==
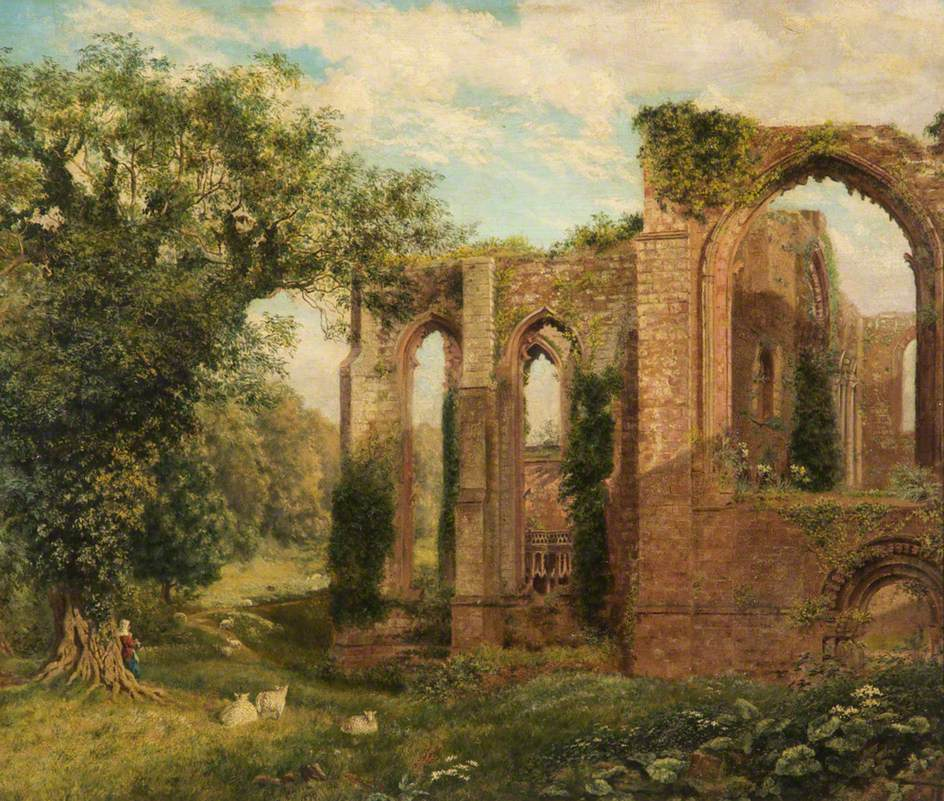
Furness Abbey, Cumbria, by Elizabeth Cameron Mawson (1877)

Furness Abbey has hosted a number of large-scale mystery plays. The first of these were performed over several consecutive nights in 1958. The mystery plays continued throughout the 1960s until the recruitment of participants, perhaps over 100, became difficult. Author Melvyn Bragg attended the 1988 mystery plays revival, which were the last such performances at the abbey. Prince Edward has also attended a mystery play.

== Access and facilities ==
Furness Abbey is located off Manor Road close to Barrow's main thoroughfare, Abbey Road, which is named after the Abbey itself. The Abbey also lies next to the Furness Line and was served by Furness Abbey railway station until closure in 1950. The closest stations are now Roose and Dalton.

English Heritage operates a small visitor centre at Furness Abbey which includes a number of stone carvings and effigies as well as a gift shop. It, alongside the abbey is open to the public in the summer season. During winter venturing into the Abbey is strongly discouraged due to the Abbey grounds being prone to flooding.

== In literature ==
In addition to work by William Wordsworth, Furness Abbey features twice in the Fisher's Drawing Room Scrap Books of the 1830s, both with a poetical illustration by Letitia Elizabeth Landon: in the 1832 edition: Furness Abbey, in the Vale of Nightshade, Lancashire to a drawing by Harwood, in which she 'sighs for the days of the veil and the vow', as an escape from the vanity of the modern world; and, in the 1835 edition: Chapter House, Furness Abbey to a painting by Thomas Allom, a descriptive passage from the French of Charles Augustin Sainte-Beuve.

== Gallery ==
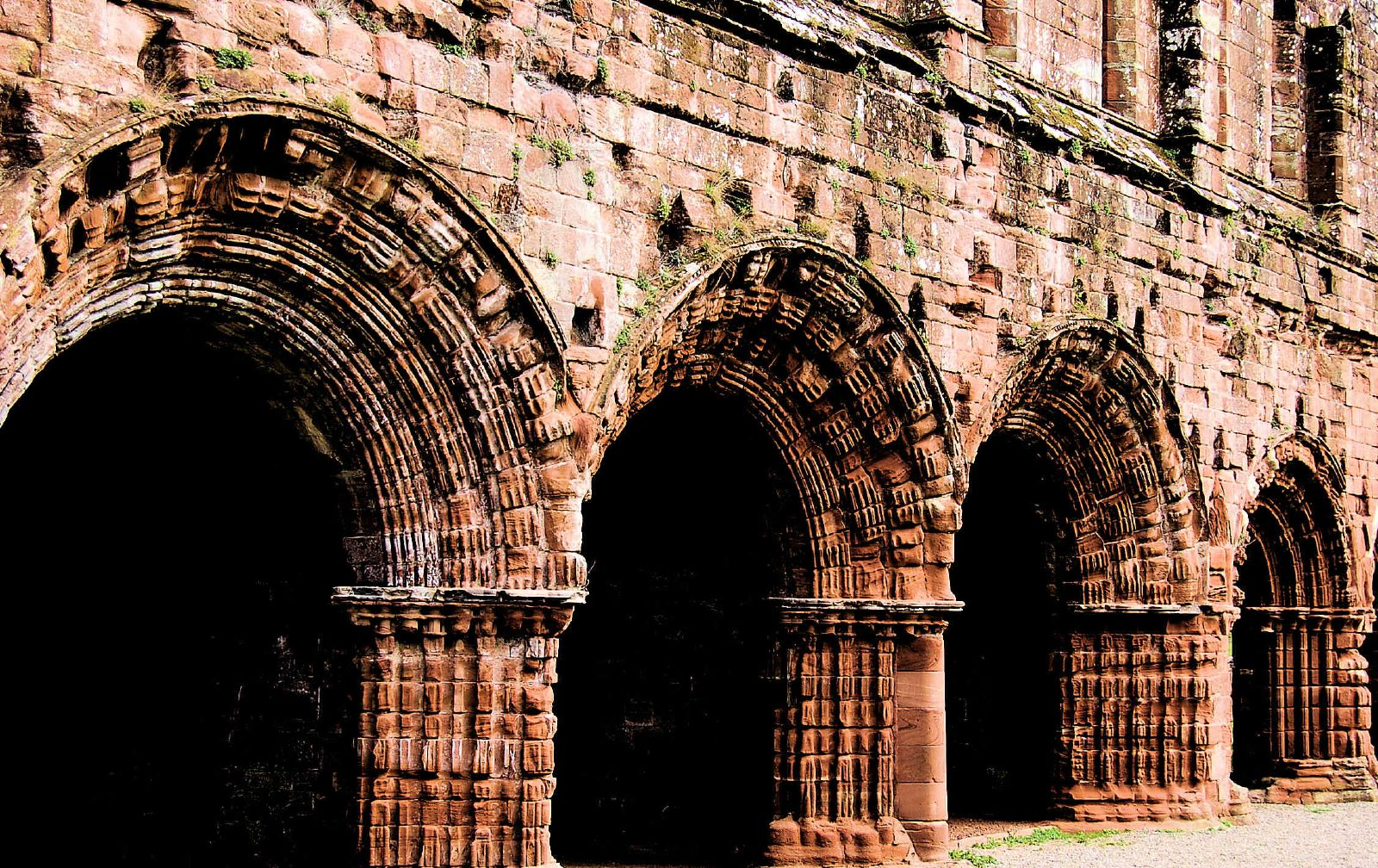
Detail of some of the abbey's arch ways

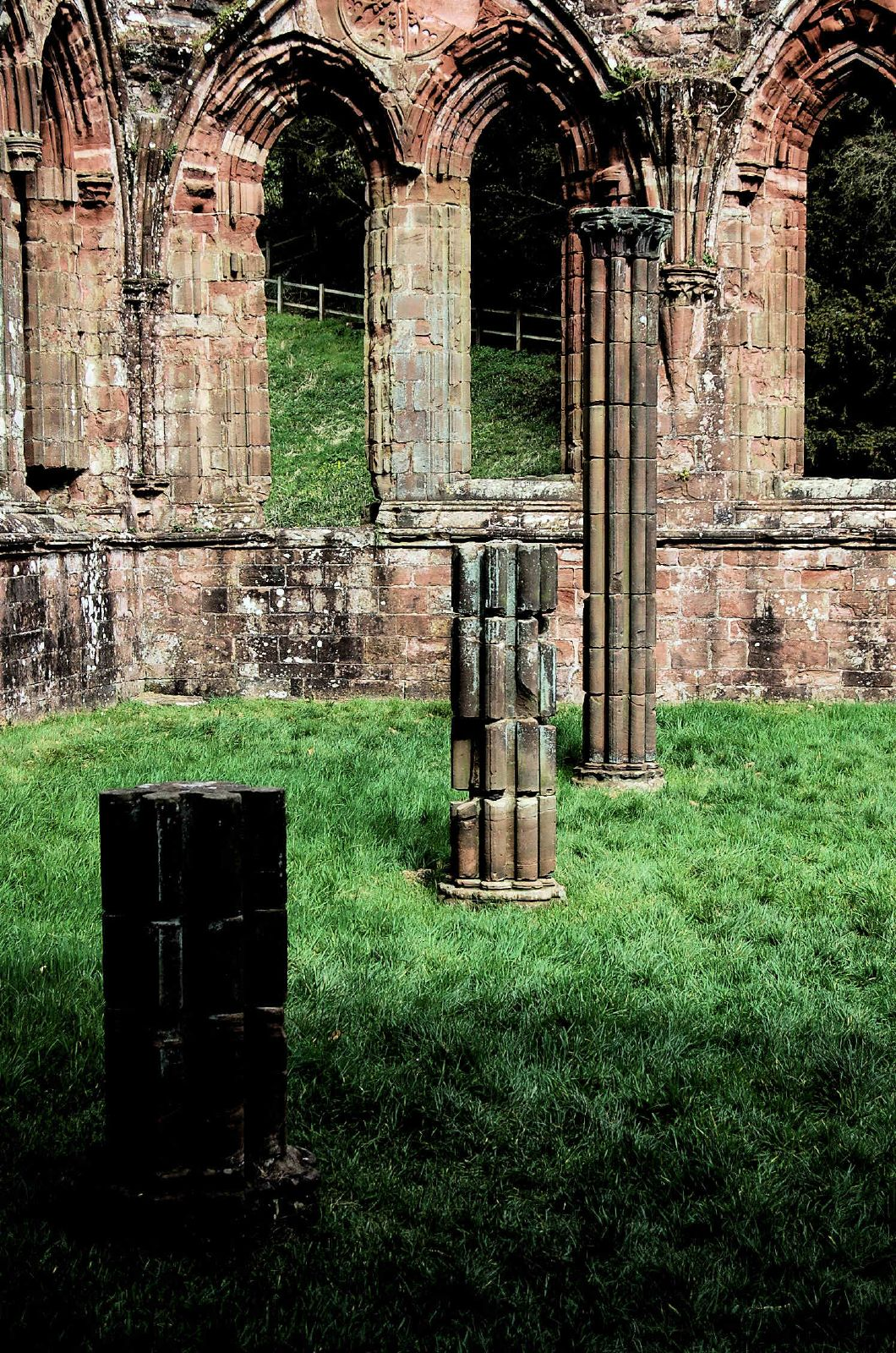
Ruined pillars within the chapter

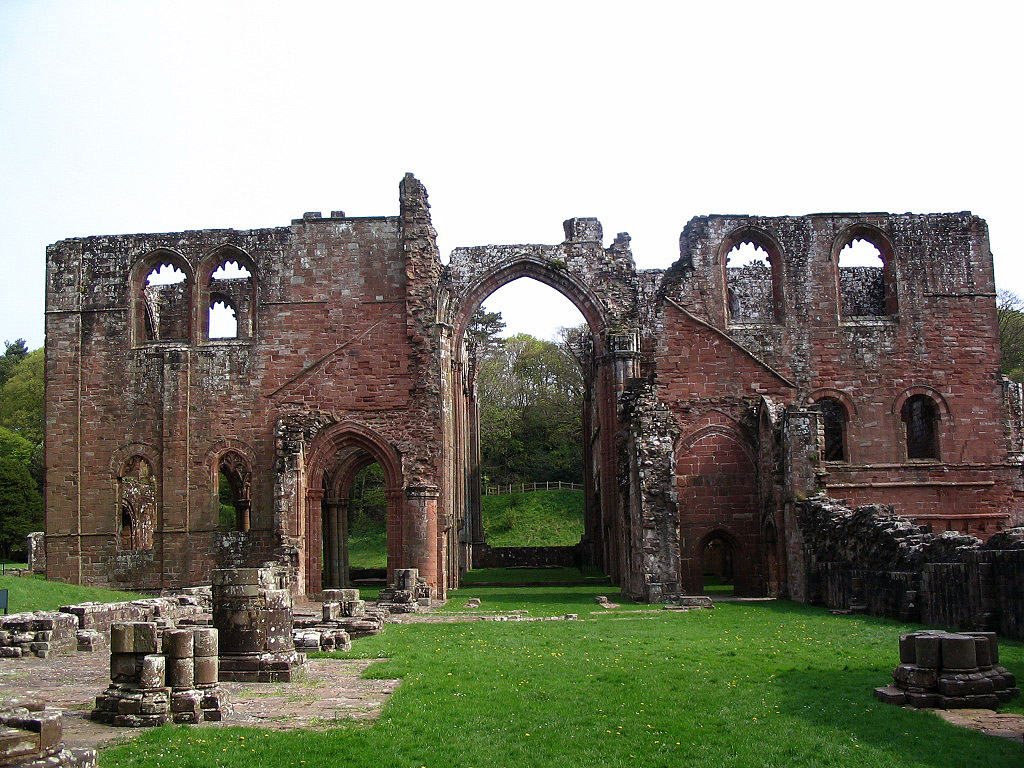
View towards the former quire and presbytery along the nave

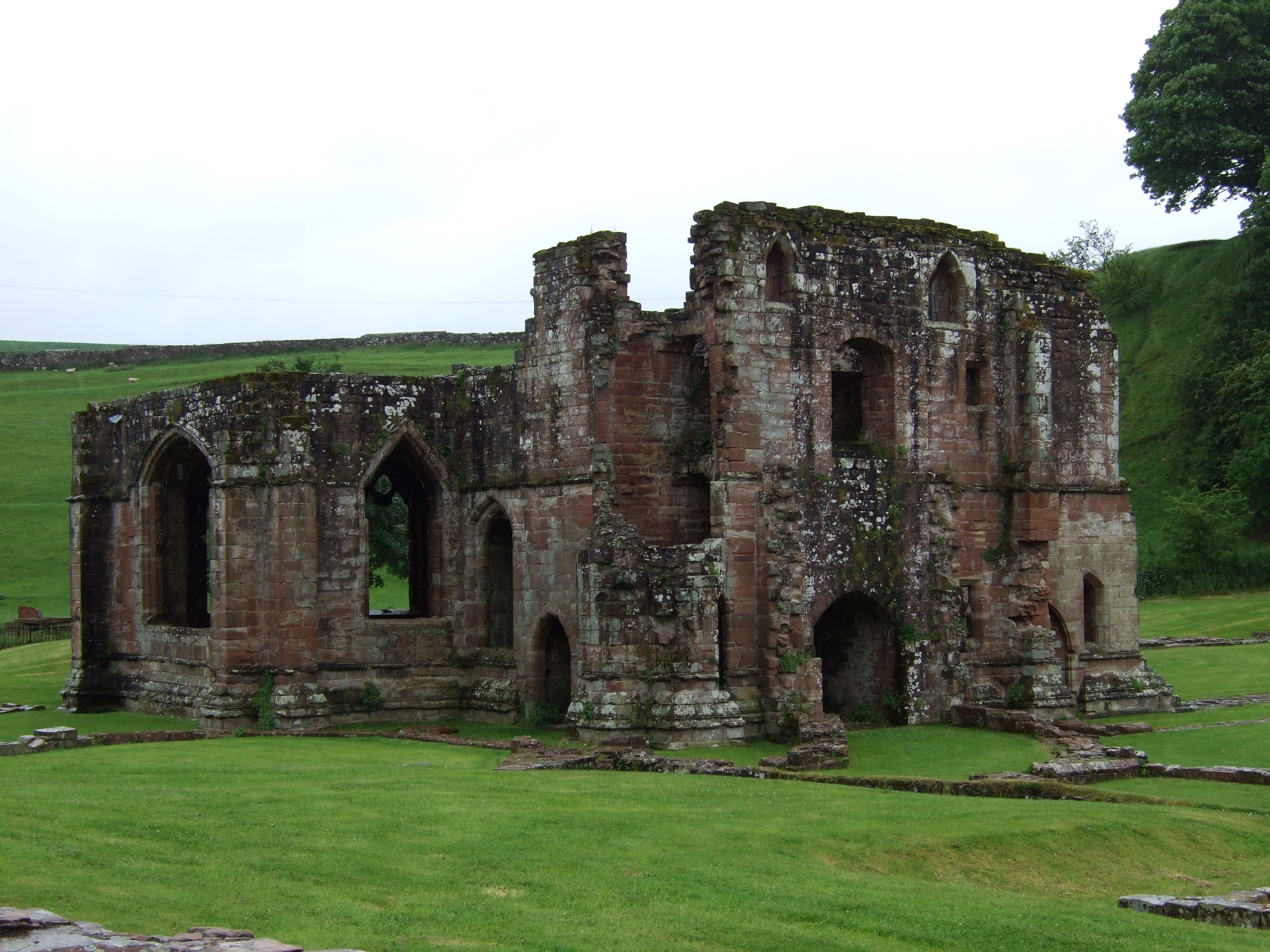
Ruins of the infirmary

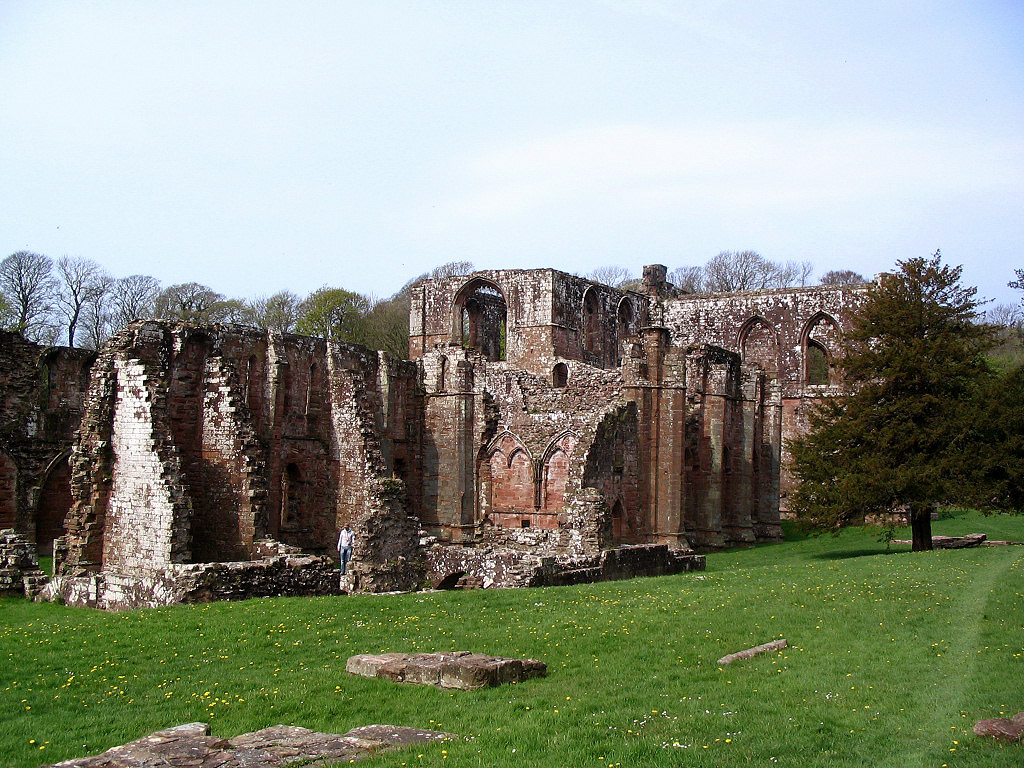
The abbey viewed from the south-east including the reredorter

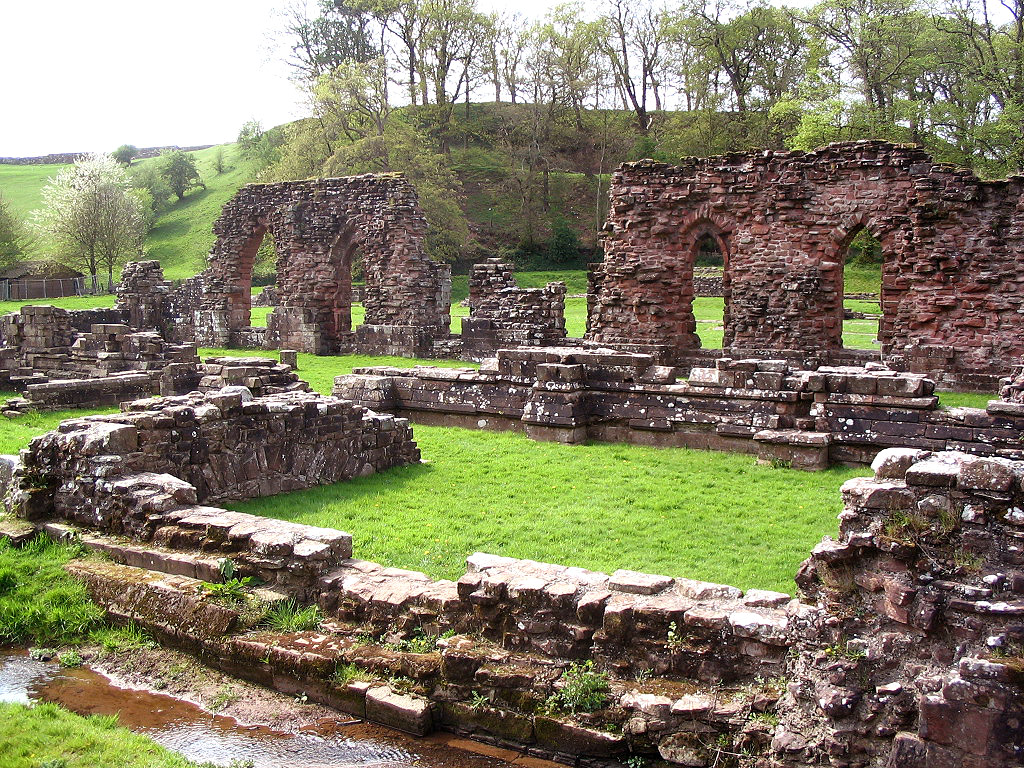
Ruins of the east range

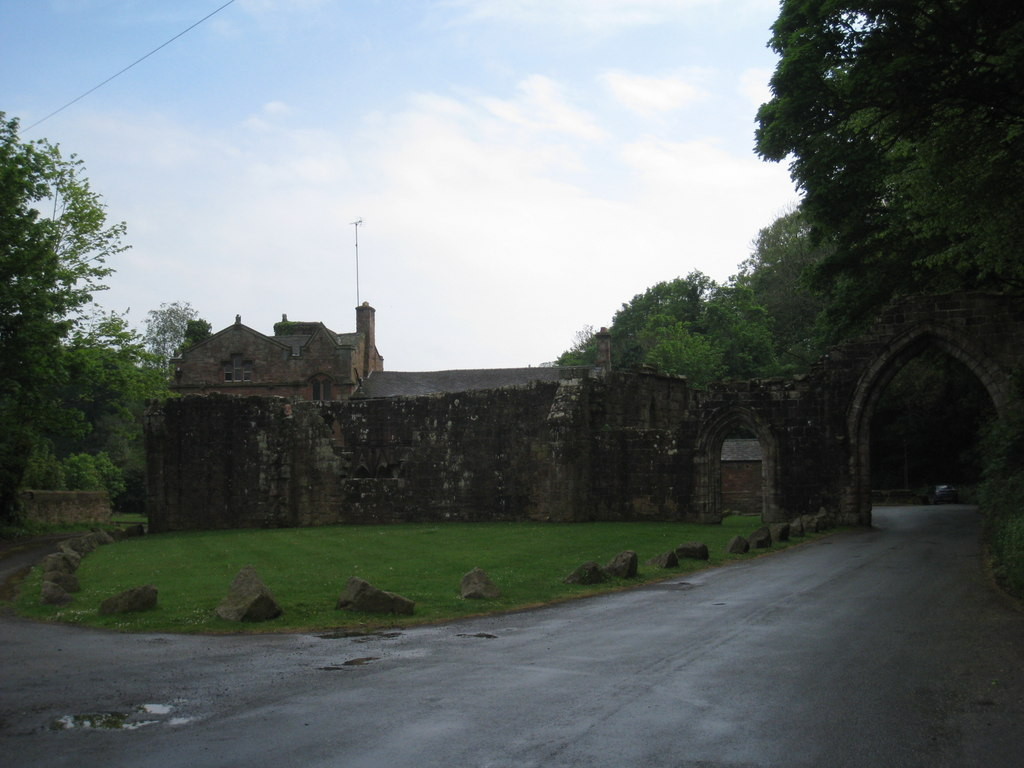
Former gateway to the abbey

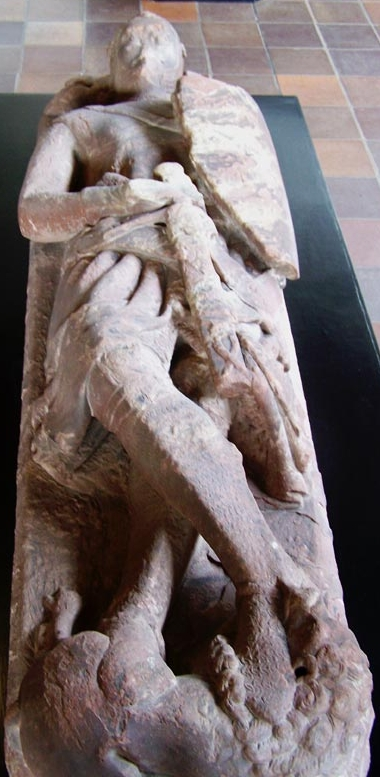
Grave cover on display in the visitor centre

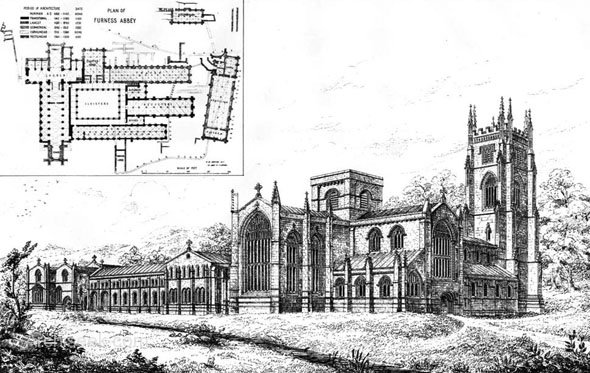
1888 imagination of the abbey prior to destruction

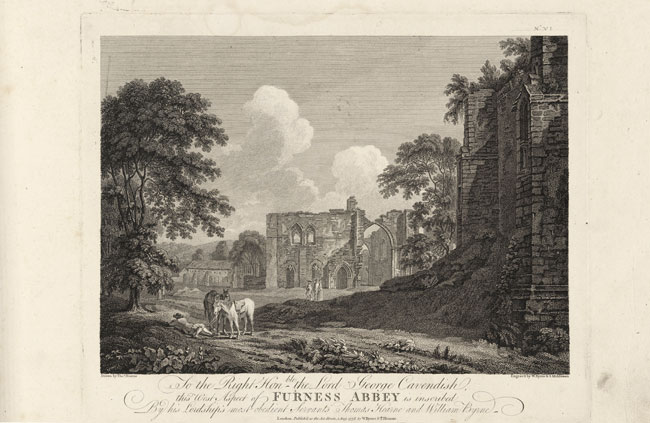
1778 print of the abbey

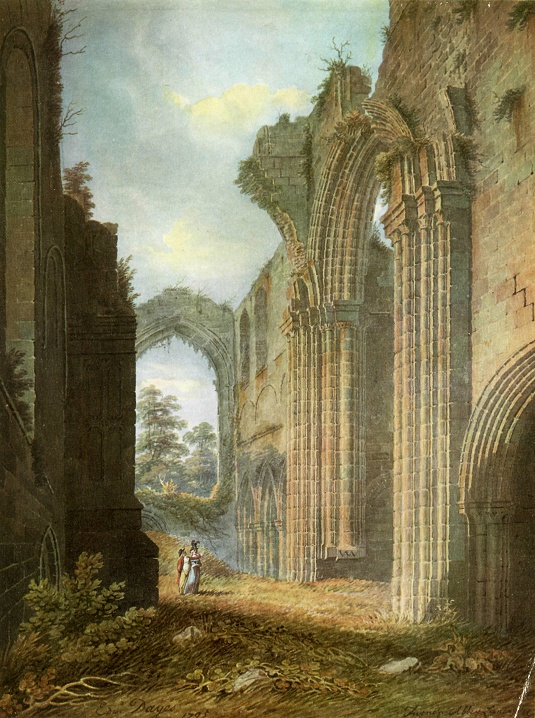
Painting of the abbey by Edward Dayes

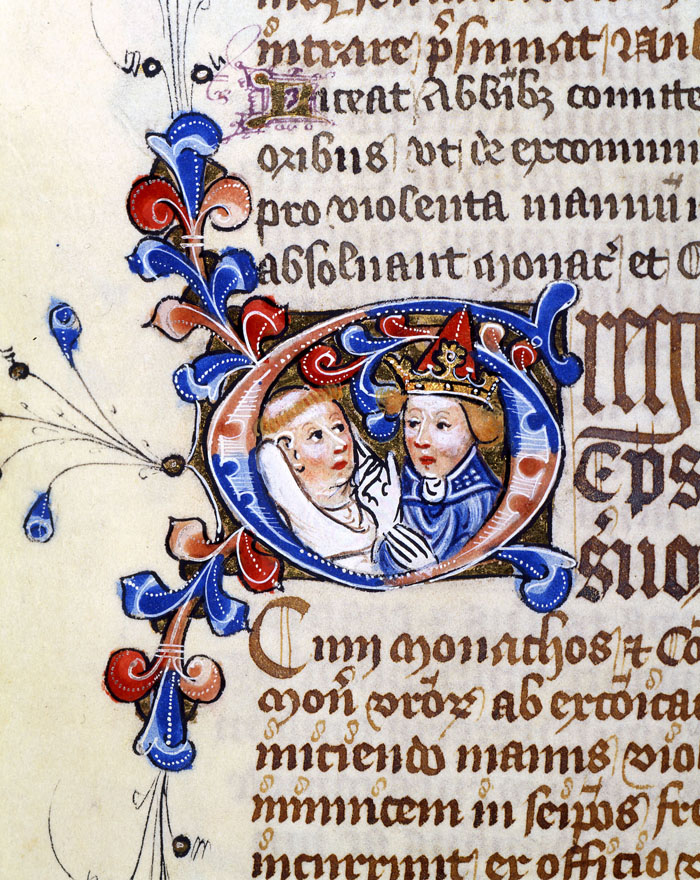
1412 manuscript relating to the abbey

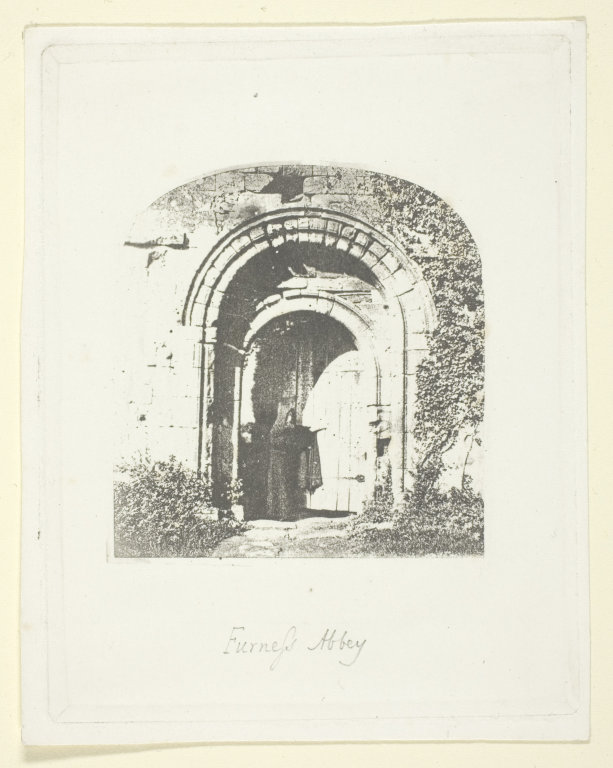
Furness Abbey by Henry Fox Talbot, circa 1850s

== See also ==
- List of monasteries dissolved by Henry VIII of England
- Listed buildings in Barrow-in-Furness
- Abbot's Wood, Cumbria
