= Abbot of Kilwinning =

The Abbot of Kilwinning (later Commendator of Kilwinning) was the head of the Tironensian monastic community and lands of Kilwinning Abbey, Cunningham (now in North Ayrshire), founded between 1162 and 1167. The patron is not known for certain, but it is likely to have been Richard de Morville, Lord of Cunningham. The following are a list of abbots and commendators.

== List of abbots ==
- Rainer, 1186x1189
- Nigel (?Niall), 1201-1210
- John, 1221x1230
- Bernard, 1296
- Roger, 1296x1305
- Adam, 1312-1327
- William de Deyn, 1327 x 1329-1344
- John de Dalgarnoc, 1344-1346
- Robert, 1360-1367
- John, 1384
- Bryce MacMakyn, 1407
- Adam, 1407 - 1439
- William Boyd, 1443-1474
- William Bunche, 1474 -1513
- John Forman, 1512 -1514

== List of commendators ==
- James Beaton, 1513-1524
- John Cantlie, 1521
- John Hamilton, 1524
- George Betoun, 1526-1527
- Alexander Hamilton, 1527-1547
- Henry Sinclair, 1541-1550
- Gavin Hamilton, 1550-1571
- Alexander Cunningham, 1571-1585
- James Cunningham, 1585
- William Melville, 1591-1592

== See also ==
- Kilwinning Abbey

== Bibliography ==
- Cowan, Ian B. & Easson, David E., Medieval Religious Houses: Scotland With an Appendix on the Houses in the Isle of Man, Second Edition, (London, 1976), p. 69
- Watt, D.E.R. & Shead, N.F. (eds.), The Heads of Religious Houses in Scotland from the 12th to the 16th Centuries, The Scottish Records Society, New Series, Volume 24, (Edinburgh, 2001), pp. 127–30
