= Berlin Crucifixion =

Panel painting attributed to Giotto di Bondone

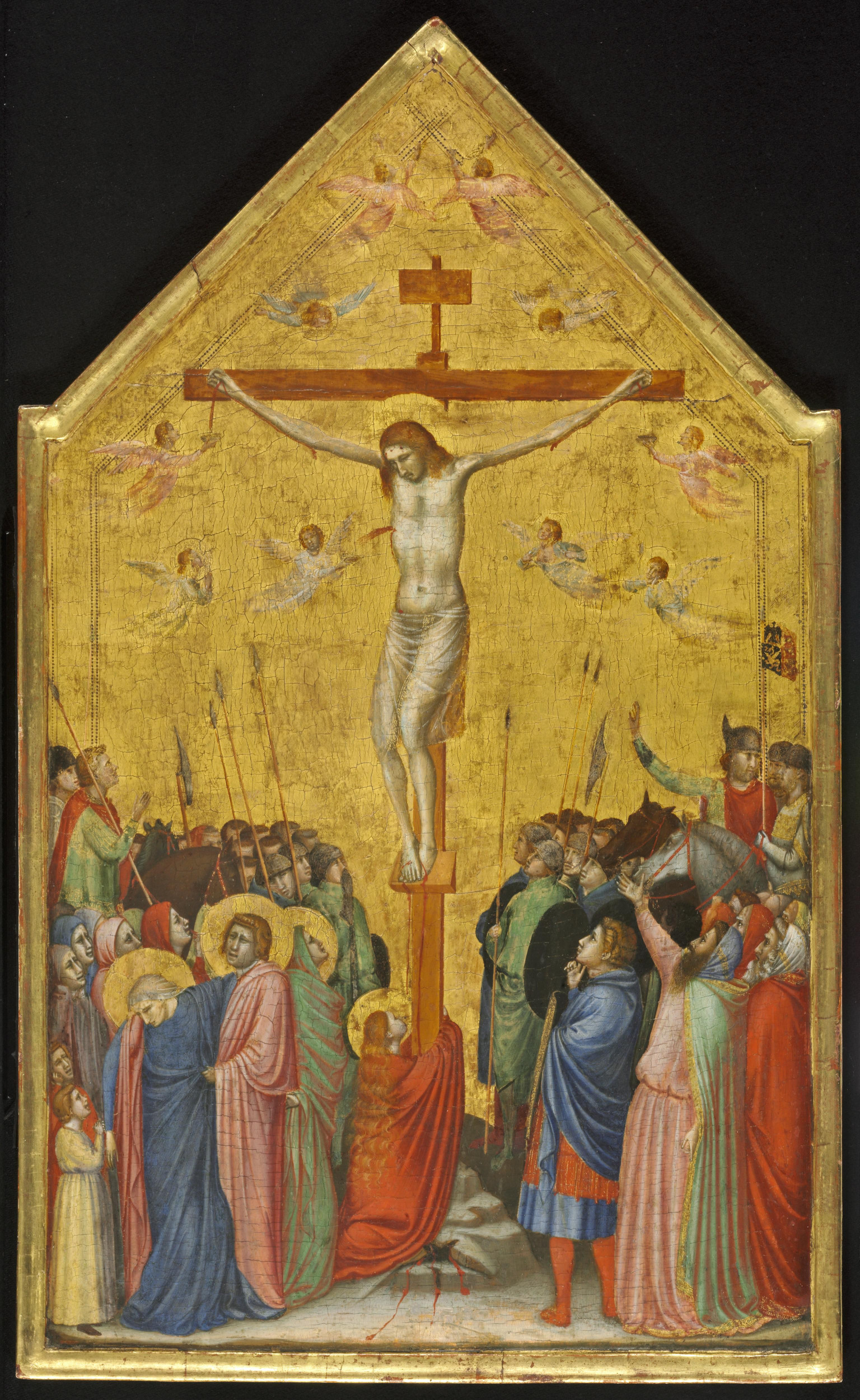
- Artist: Attributed to Giotto
- Year: c. 1320
- Dimensions: 58 cm × 33 cm (23 in × 13 in)
- Location: Gemäldegalerie, Berlin

The Berlin Crucifixion is a tempera and gold on panel painting that was created c. 1320 and is attributed to Giotto. It is stored at the Gemäldegalerie in Berlin.

== History ==
The first studies of the Berlin Crucifixion by Wilhelm von Bode attributed the work to Giotto. Following critics, like Roberto Longhi in 1948, have doubted the attribution. Others like William Suida, Pietro Toesca, and Richard Offner theorized a "Master of the Strasbourg Crucifixion", placing the Berlin Crucifixion in relation with other similar small-format works. Roberto Salvini, on the other hand, believed it to be the work of follower of Giotto. In each case, it is believed to be a work from late in Giotto's life, based on the voluminous drapery the painting displays as is seen in the Cappella Bardi (Santa Croce) and Cappella Peruzzi.

== Description ==
The scene is a turning point in traditional iconography, after the experimental innovations in the Crucifixion of Giotto's Scrovegni Chapel frescoes. The cross of Jesus is lifted from the center of the painting in hieratic splendor from a uniform gold ground. Sorrowful angels surround the figure of Christ, while Mary Magdalene (in a red dress) embraces the base of the cross.

Two groups gather at the painting's sides, leaving the center with Christ isolated. At left, the group of women surrounds Mary, who is fainting, and a young girl looks at her worried. Saint John the Baptist stands at right, with a man on horseback who is raising his arm, a traditional gesture made by those recognizing Jesus as the son of God.

In the depiction, Jesus is thin, almost filament-like. He is far from the sense of gravity given by the almost polemic manner of the Crocifisso di Santa Maria Novella. The figures at the sides of the painting are cut off, giving the impression of a crowd of people larger than those actually represented.

== Bibliography ==
- Baccheschi, Edi (1977), L'opera completa di Giotto (in Italian), Milan: Rizzoli
- Bellosi, Luciano (2003), "Giotto", Dal Gotico al Rinascimento (in Italian), Florence: Scala, ISBN 88-8117-092-2

== See also ==
- Crocifissione (Giotto)
- Strasbourg Crucifixion
- Life of Christ
- Crocifissione con cinque francescani
- Giotto's Crucifix at Santa Maria Novella
