= Strasbourg Crucifixion =

Painting attributed to Giotto di Bondone

The Crucifixion
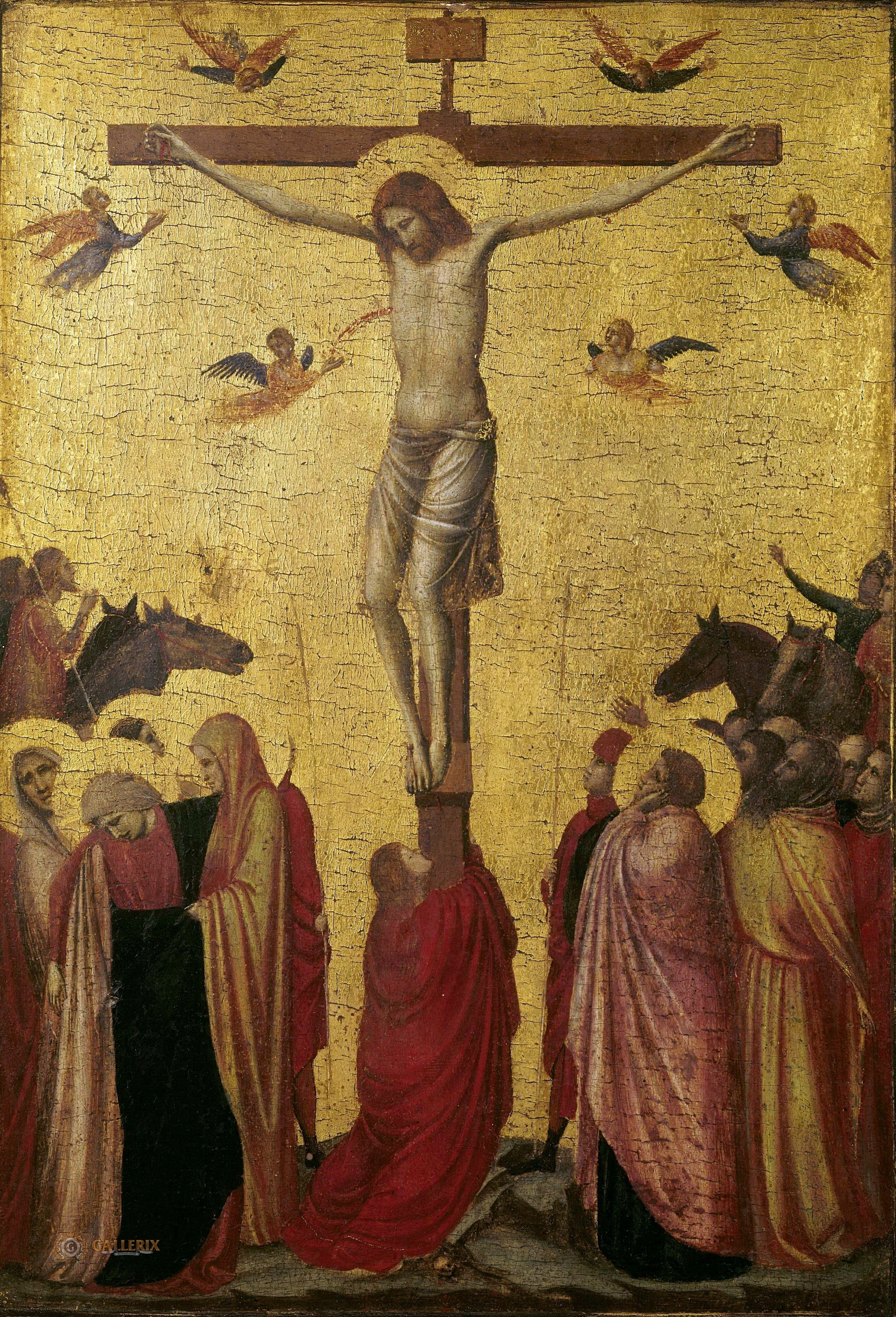
- Artist: Giotto (attributed)
- Year: circa 1315
- Medium: tempera on panel
- Movement: Trecento, early Italian Renaissance painting, Catholic art
- Subject: Jesus on the Cross
- Dimensions: 45.3 cm × 32.7 cm (17.8 in × 12.9 in)
- Location: Musée des Beaux-Arts, Strasbourg
- Accession: 1890

The Strasbourg Crucifixion is a painting in tempera and gold on panel of c. 1315 attributed to Giotto, now in the Musée des Beaux-Arts (inventory number 167) of Strasbourg, France.

== History ==
Previously attributed to the school of Giotto, Roberto Longhi attributed it to the master himself in 1948. It probably formed a diptych with the Madonna Enthroned between the Virtues (Wildenstein Collection, New York), attributed to the Master of the Sails. Art historians Gnudi and Salvini did not include the work in their catalogue of Giotto's works. William Suida, Pietro Toesca, and Offner attribute the work to a "Master of the Strasbourg Crucifixion" to which they also attribute the Berlin Crucifixion, a similar work in small format. Even today critics are uncertain about the work's attribution, although it has unambiguously been attributed to Giotto on major occasions such as the 2013 Giotto exhibition in the Louvre. In any case, the work is dated to the late phase of Giotto's career, as demonstrated by the voluminous drapery, as found in both the Cappella Peruzzi and Cappella Bardi.

== Description and style ==
The scene follows traditional iconography, with the experimental innovations of the Crucifixion in Scrovegni Chapel. The cross of Christ occupies the center of the painting, on a uniform gold ground. Grieving angels crowd around the figure of Christ, while below Mary Magdalene (wearing red) embraces the cross. Two groups stand at the sides, leaving the central section isolated. At left is a group of pious women with Mary, who is fainting. At right, there is Saint John the Baptist and a centurion, who is raising his arm. Their presence is all typical of Crucifixion iconography.

Christ is slender, almost reedy, and far from depictions of weight found in works like the Crocifisso di Santa Maria Novella. One innovation is the manner in which the figures are cut off by the borders of the painting, giving the impression of a gather of figures larger than that represented on the panel.

== Comparable works ==
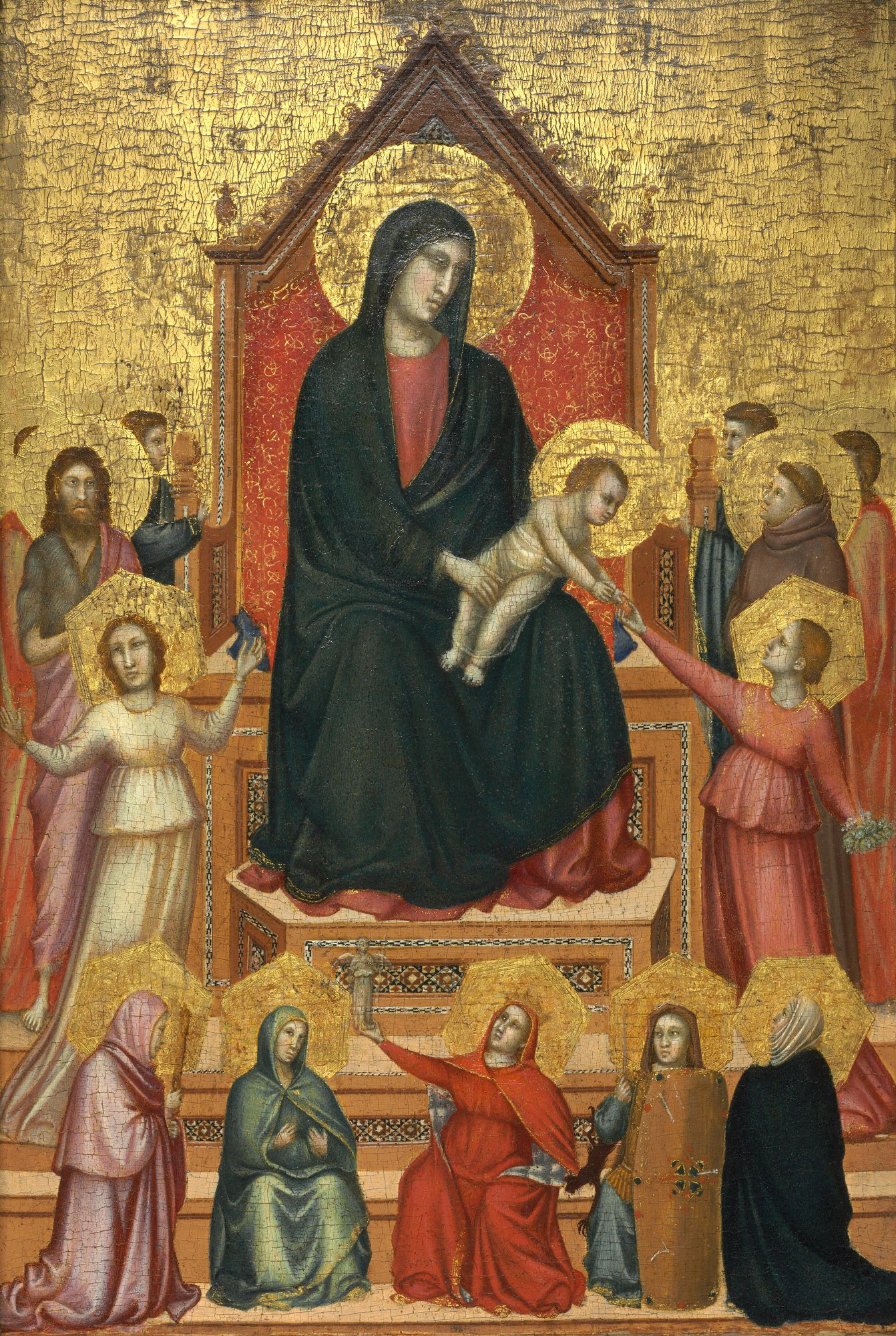
Wildenstein Madonna

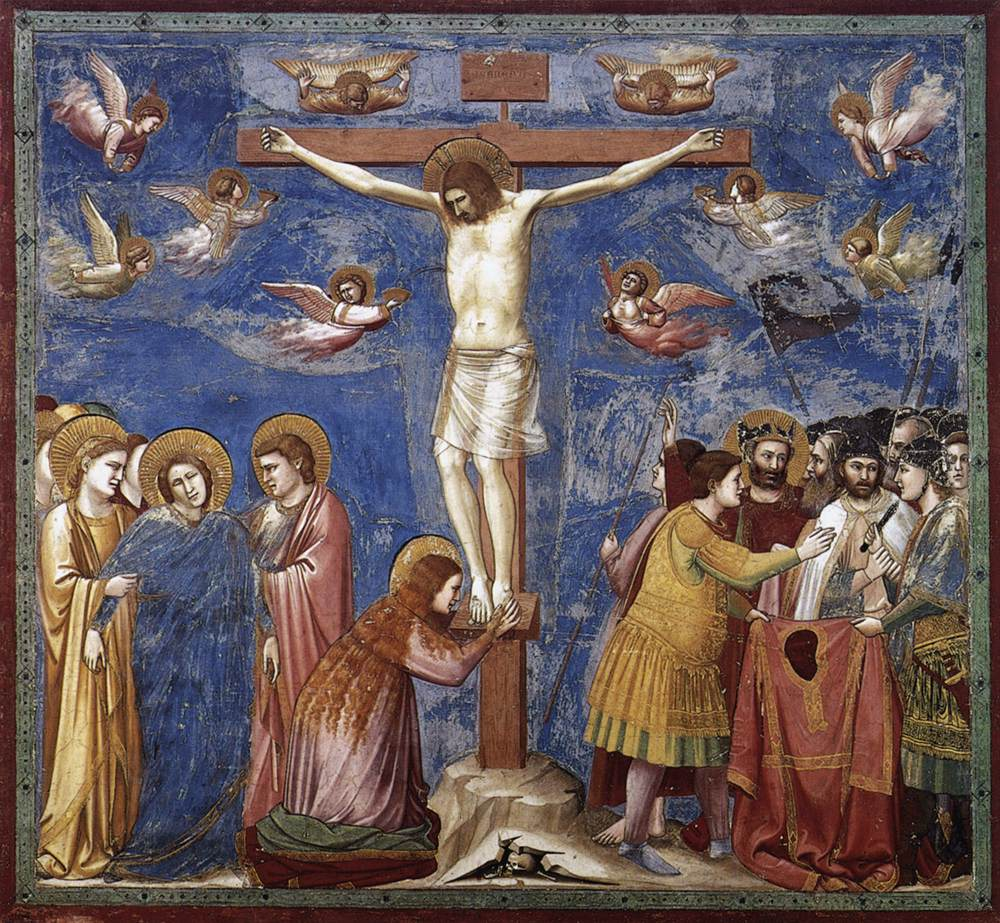
Crucifixion in the Scrovegni Chapel, Padua (c. 1303–1305)

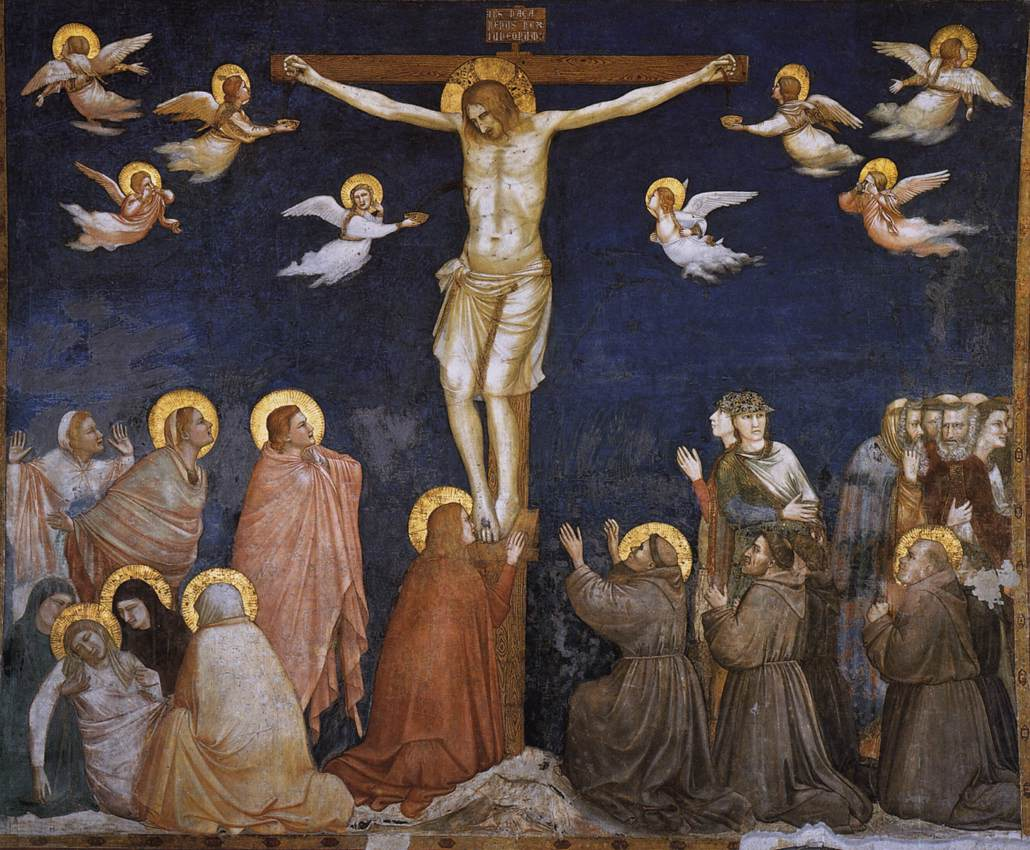
Crucifixion with Five Franciscan Saints in the lower basilica in Assisi (c. 1308–1310)

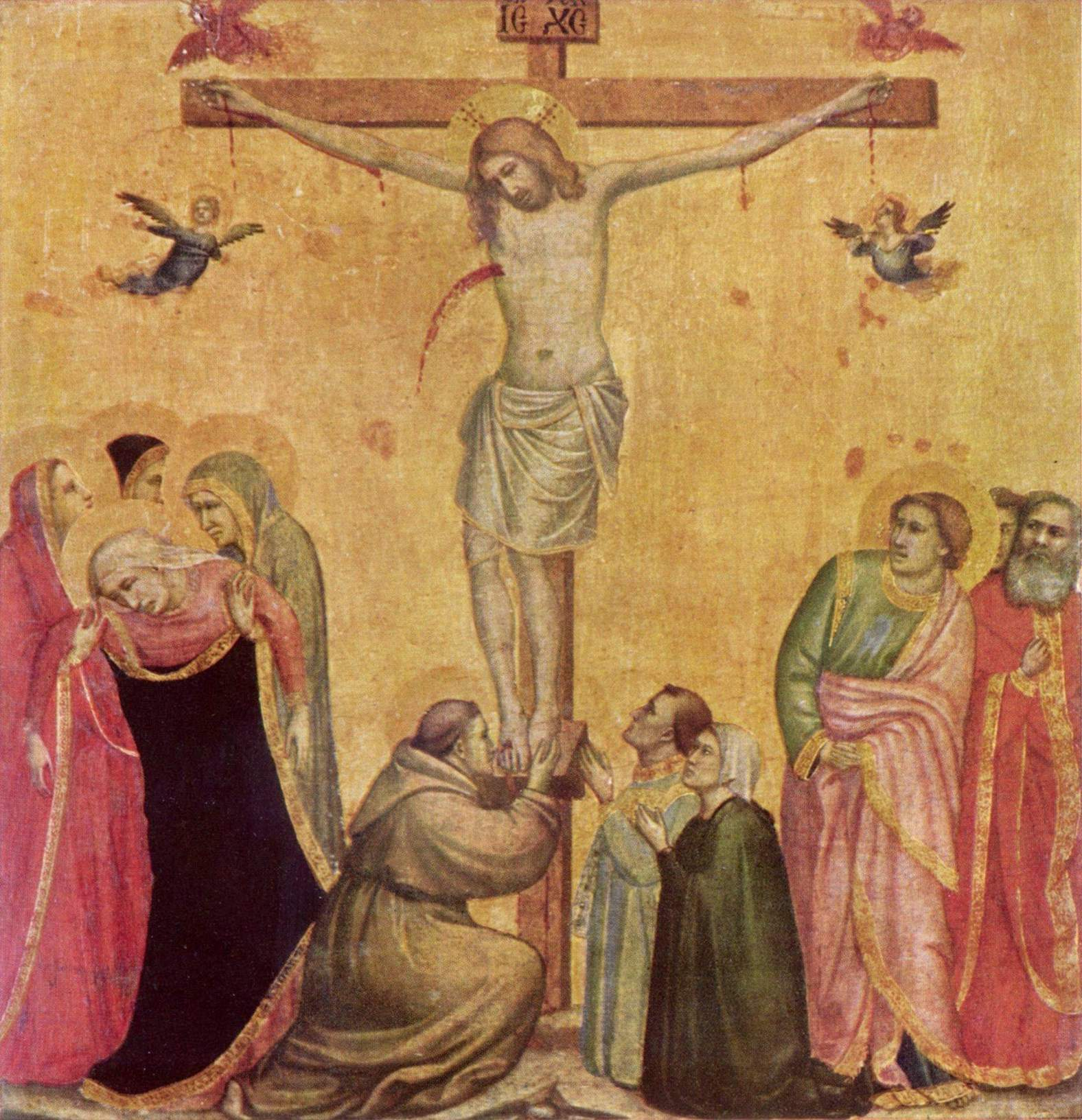
Crucifixion (Alte Pinakothek), from the Seven Panels with the Life of Christ (c. 1320–1325)

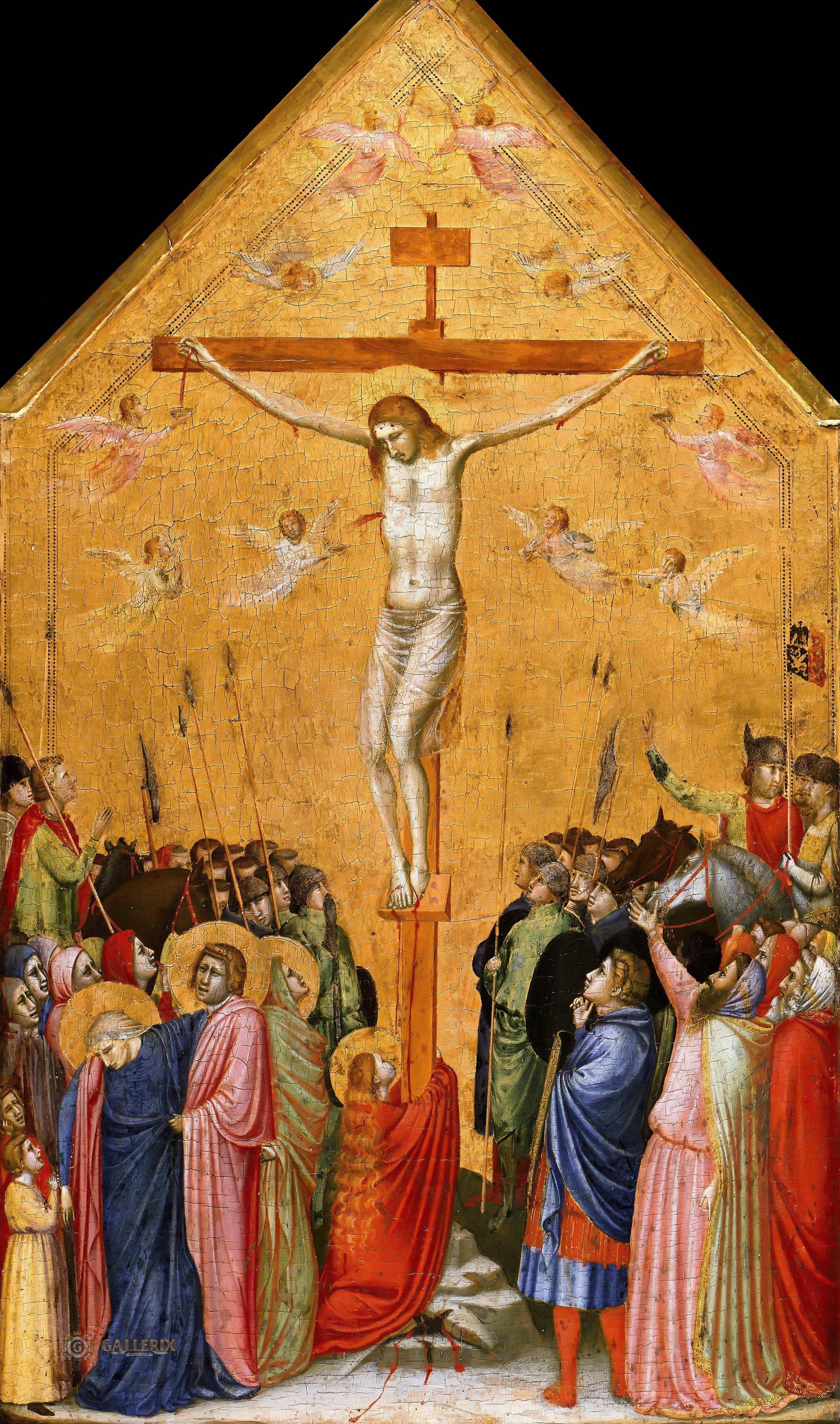
The Berlin Crucifixion (c. 1320)
