= Master of Pratovecchio =

Italian painter

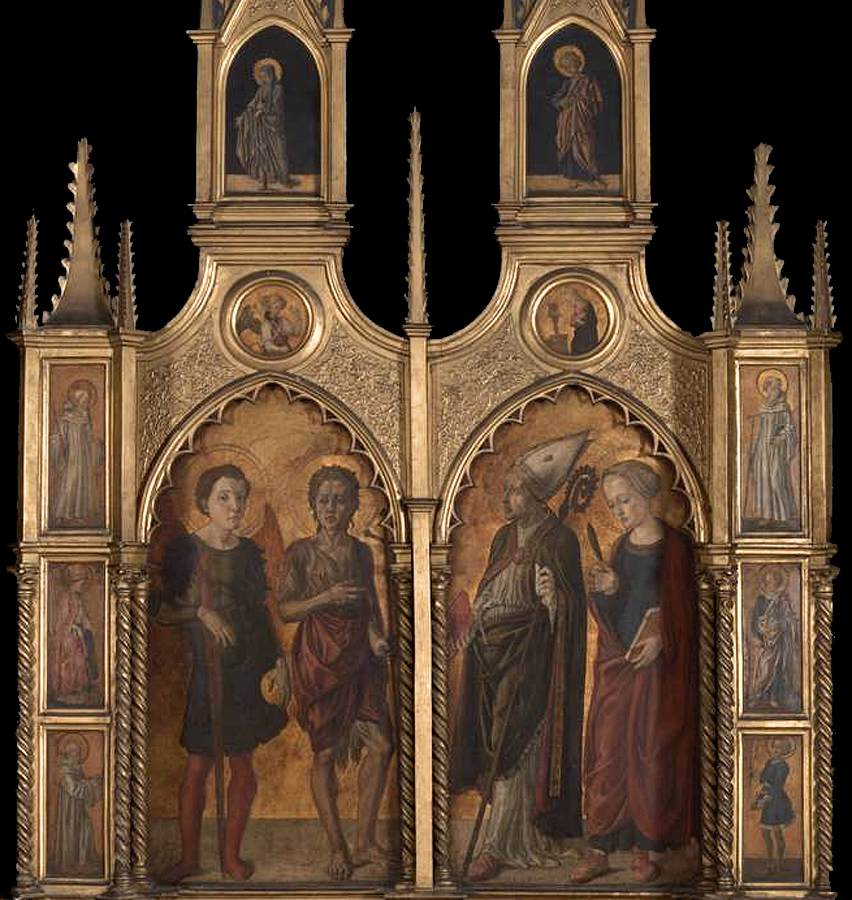
Left and right side-panels of the Pratovecchio altarpiece, depicting St Michael and John the Baptist, a bishop saint and a female martyr. Italian ca. 1450, National Gallery, London

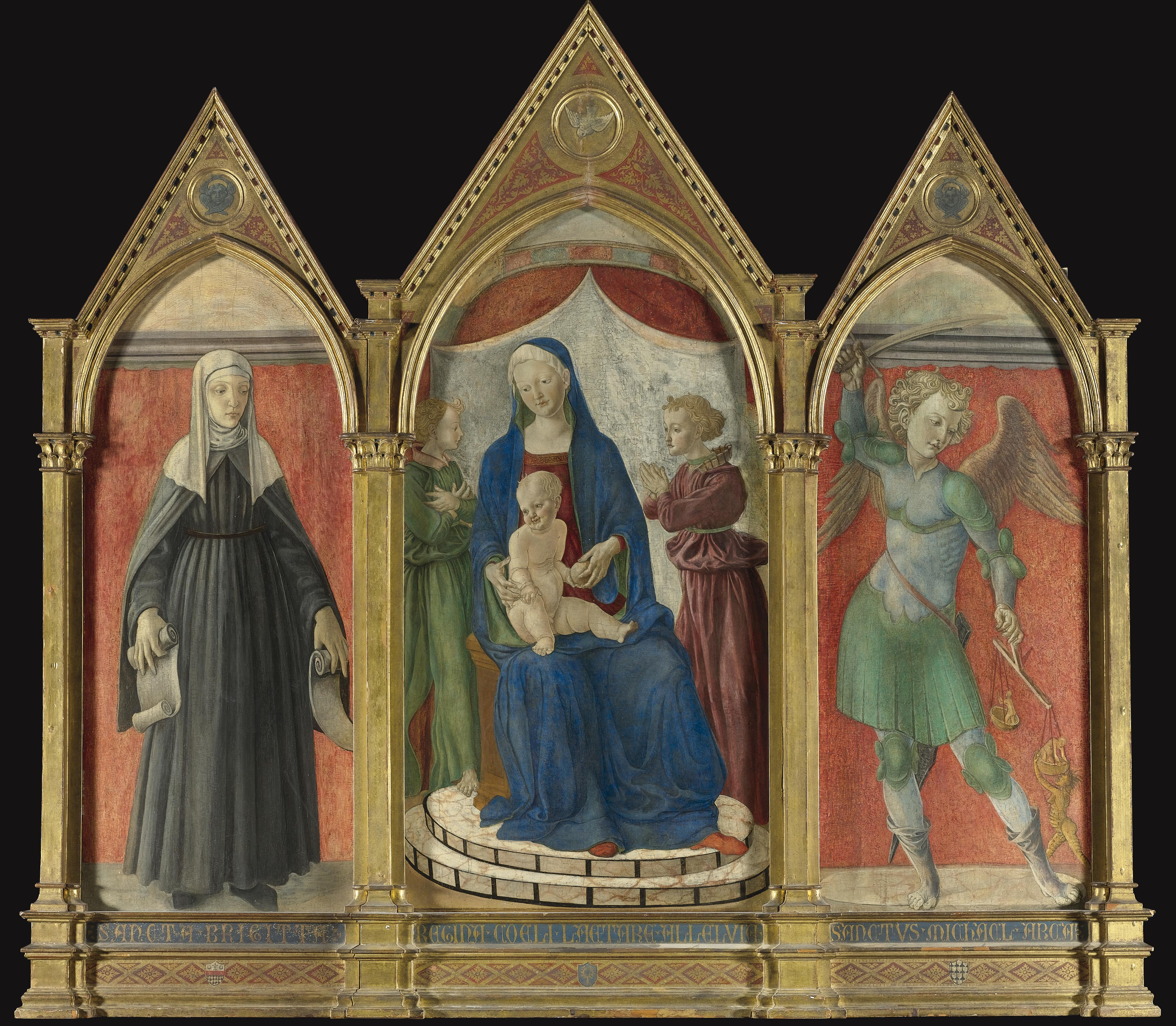
Madonna and Child with Saint Bridget and the Archangel Michael, formerly in the Getty Collection

The Master of Pratovecchio (active between about 1435 and 1455) was an Italian painter of the Renaissance, named by Roberto Longhi in a 1952 article on the basis of stylistic similarities of a number of works to an altarpiece painted for the monastery of San Giovanni Evangelista in Pratovecchio. The centre panel of the triptych, depicting the Assumption of the Virgin is currently on deposit in Arrezo; the left and right side-panels are in the National Gallery, London.

Other works attributed to the artist include Three Archangels in the Gemäldegalerie, Berlin, a Madonna and Child in the Fogg Art Museum, Cambridge, Massachusetts, another Madonna and Child in the Pinacoteca di Brera, Milan and a Madonna with six angels, in the Pierpont Morgan Library & Museum, New York.

The Master's works are considered to be strongly influenced by the painters Domenico Veneziano and Andrea del Castagno, but also the sculptor Donatello.

In 1974 a painting then in the Getty collection attributed to the Master of Pratovecchio (subsequently sold in 2011), depicting a Madonna and Child with Saint Bridget and the Archangel Michael, was linked by Burton B. Fredricksen to a painting similarly to have included the Archangel Michael and Saint Bridget, commissioned in 1439 for the Bridgetine convent at Pian di Ripoli, for which payment was made to a Giovanni di Francesco del Cervelliera da Rovezzano. However, due to marked differences in style between the works attributed to the Master of Pratovecchio and those attributed for Giovanni di Francesco later in the 1450s, it has been suggested that despite the payment, the work was not created by Giovanni di Francesco, but only later, by another.

Another name, suggested by Padoa Rizzo in 1993, is Jacopo di Antonio (1427-1454), a cousin of Giovanni di Francesco. However, the only work previously associated with him is of a different style again, attributed by some instead to Pesellino or a close follower. Writing in 2005 Andrea De Marchi therefore considered the identifications so far presented to be "not at all satisfactory".
