= Anna Banti =

Italian writer, art historian and translator

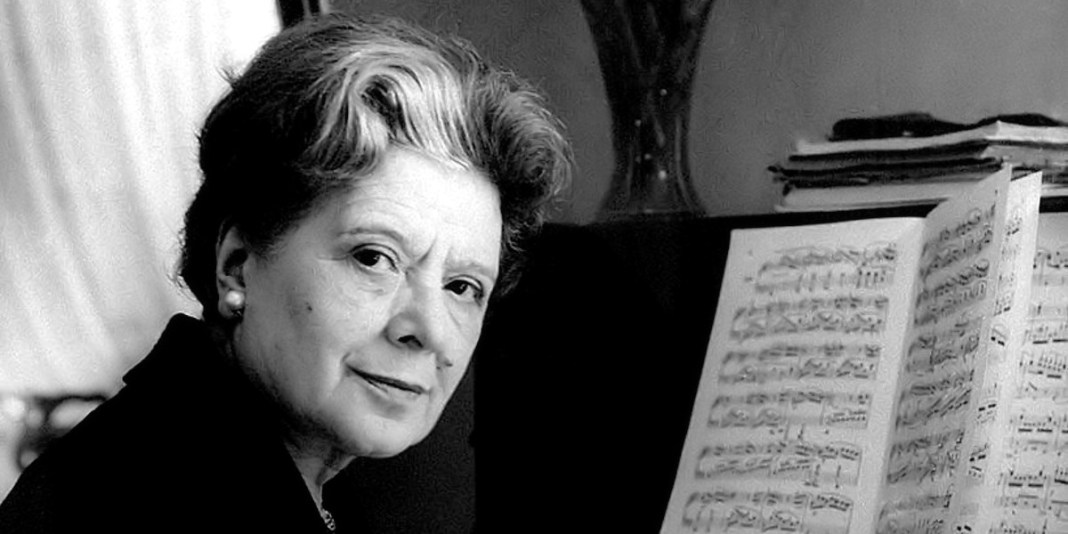

Anna Banti (born Lucia Lopresti; 27 June 1895 – 2 September 1985) was an Italian writer, art historian, critic, and translator.

== Life and works ==
Banti was born in Florence. In her youth she spent time in Rome, attending the University of Rome and Bologna before returning permanently to Florence. At the university, she received a degree in art history. Her pseudonym derived from "an exceptionally beautiful woman" she knew in her youth. She married art critic Roberto Longhi and in 1950 they founded and edited the bi-monthly art magazine Paragone.

Banti published a number of stories over the next decades, among which the novella, Lavinia fuggita, remains important for its close thematic relationship to her well- known historical novel, Artemisia, based on the painter Artemisia Gentileschi. So identified was Banti with the painter, that one newspaper headlined their report of Banti's death as Addio, Artemisia. The novel revived interest in Gentileschi's work and life.

Banti's autobiographical work, Un Grido Lacerante, published in 1981, won the Antonio Feltrinelli Prize.

As well as being a successful author, Banti is recognized as a literary, cinematic, and art critic. After the death of Longhi in 1970, she replaced him as the editor of Paragone.

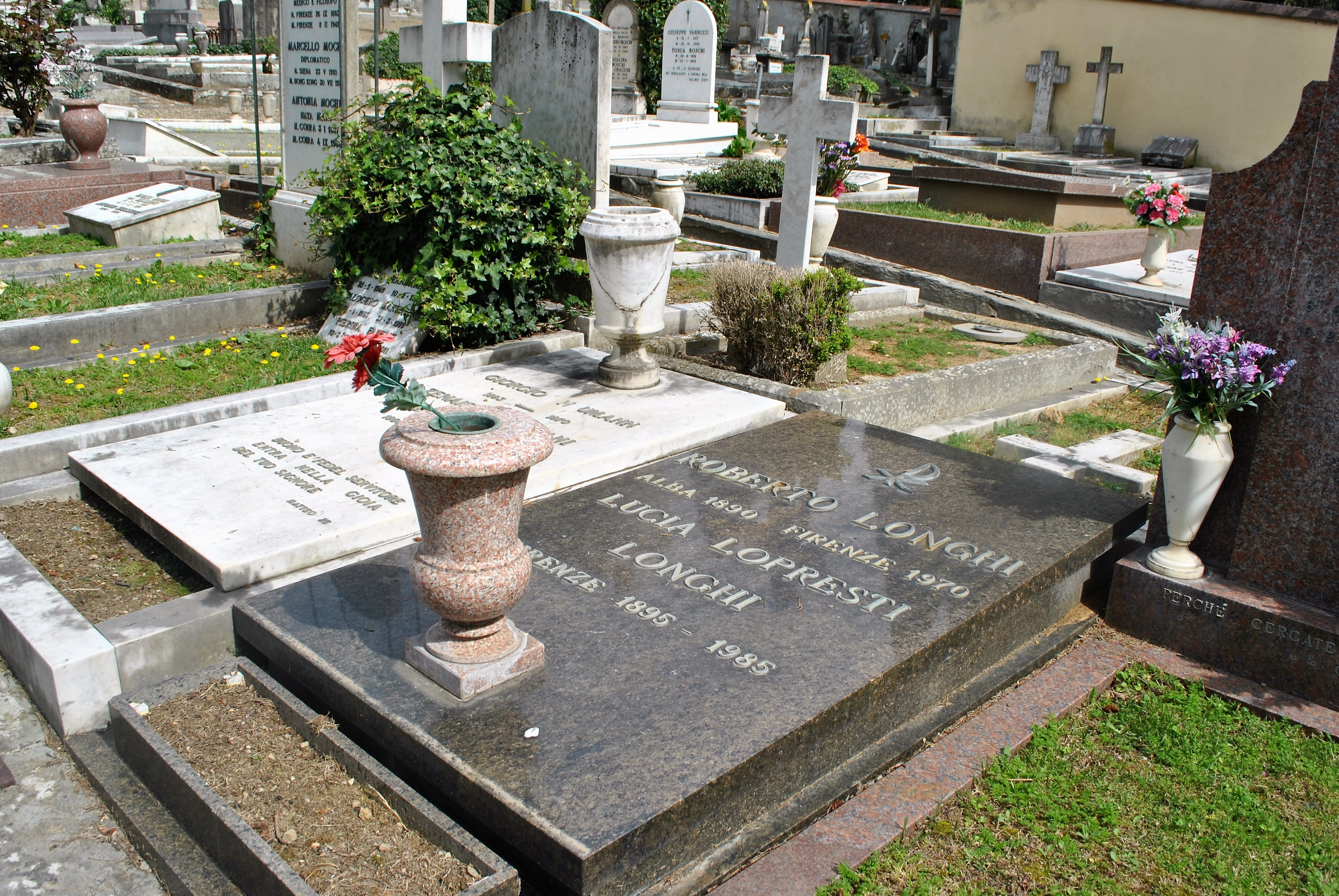
Cimitero degli Allori, Roberto Longhi and Lucia Lopresti (Ana Banti)

Banti died on 2 September 1985 in Massa, and is buried at Cimitero degli Allori in Florence.

Roberto Longhi created the Fondazione di Studi di Storia dell’Arte Roberto Longhi (also known as Fondazione Roberto Longhi) upon his death. He bequeathed the foundation his art collection, books and photographs. Lopresti bequeathed their home, the Villa Il Tasso (also known as Villa Il Ficalbo) to the foundation. The foundation was created after her husband’s death to encourage the development of art history studies.

== Anna Banti's Works Translated into English ==
- Artemisia (1988) Translated and with an afterword by Shirley D'Ardia Caracciolo. Lincoln and London: University of Nebraska Press.
- Artemisia (1989) -- Selections from the novel. Translated by Joan E. Borrelli in Longman Anthology of World Literature by Women, 1875-1975, edited by Marian Arkin and Barbara Shollar. New York: Longman, pp. 340-343.
- "The Courage of Women" (1989) (from Il coraggio delle donne) Translated by Martha J. King in New Italian Women: a collection of short fiction, edited by Martha King. New York: Italica Press.
- "After Lavinia's Flight" (1991) (Lavinia fuggita) Translated from the Italian by Joan E. Borrelli in Translation: The Journal of Literary Translation. Columbia University, Volume 25, No. 2, Spring 1991, pp. 241-271.
- A Piercing Cry (1997) (Un grido lacerante) Translated by Daria Valentini and S. Mark Lewis. New York: Peter Lang, Inc.
- "The Signorina" and Other Stories (2001) ("La signorina" e altri racconti) Translated by Martha J. King and Carol Lazzaro-Weiss. New York: Modern Language Association of America.

== Selected filmography ==
- Yes, Madam (1942)

== Awards ==
- 1972 Bagutta Prize
