= Luciano Bellosi =

Italian art historian

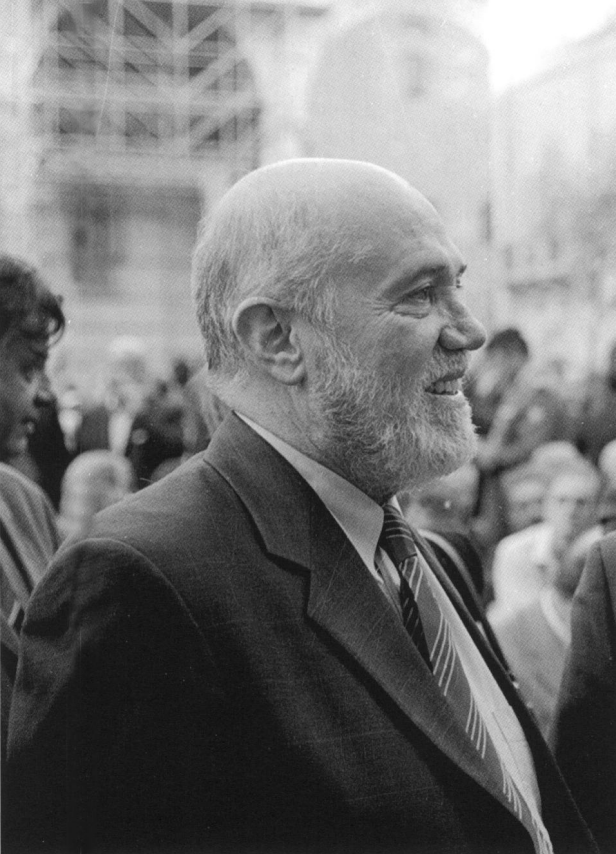
Image of Ritratto di Luciano Bellosi

Luciano Bellosi (7 July 1936 – 26 April 2011) was an Italian art historian.

== Life ==
He was born in Florence, graduating from the University of Florence in 1963 alongside Roberto Longhi with a thesis on Lorenzo Monaco. He worked for the Soprintendenza alle Gallerie di Firenze from 1969 to 1979, before teaching medieval art history at the University of Siena until his retirement in 2002. He took part in several international art history conferences, organised and edited the Atti del Convegno internazionale di studio su Simone Martini held in Siena in 1985.

== Works ==
=== Studies and essays ===
- Buffalmacco e il Trionfo della Morte, Einaudi, Torino 1974; Premio Viareggio Opera Prima di Saggistica, nuova edizione 5 Continents, Milano 2003;
- catalogue of Florence's Museo dello Spedale degli Innocenti, Milano 1977;
- La pecora di Giotto, Einaudi, Torino 1985;
- monograph on Cimabue, Federico Motta, Milano 1998;
- Come un prato fiorito. Studi sull'arte tardogotica, Jaca Book, Milano 2000;
- "I vivi parean vivi": scritti di storia dell'arte italiana del Duecento e del Trecento, Centro Di, Firenze 2006.

=== Exhibitions ===
He organised the following exhibitions and edited their catalogues:

- Arte in Valdichiana dal XIII al XVIII secolo, Cortona 1970;
- Lorenzo Ghiberti: Materia e ragionamenti, Firenze 1978;
- Pittura di luce. Giovanni di Francesco e l'arte fiorentina di metà Quattrocento, Firenze 1990;
- Una scuola per Piero. Luce, colore e prospettiva nella formazione fiorentina di Piero della Francesca, Firenze 1992;
- Francesco di Giorgio e il Rinascimento a Siena, Siena 1993;
- Masaccio e le origini del Rinascimento, San Giovanni Valdarno 2003;
- Duccio. Alle origini della pittura senese, Siena 2003.

== Personal library and archive ==
The Biblioteca Umanistica dell'Università di Siena houses his library of 8,000 volumes, particularly art historical monographs.
