= Giovanni di Francesco =

Italian Renaissance painter (1412–1459)

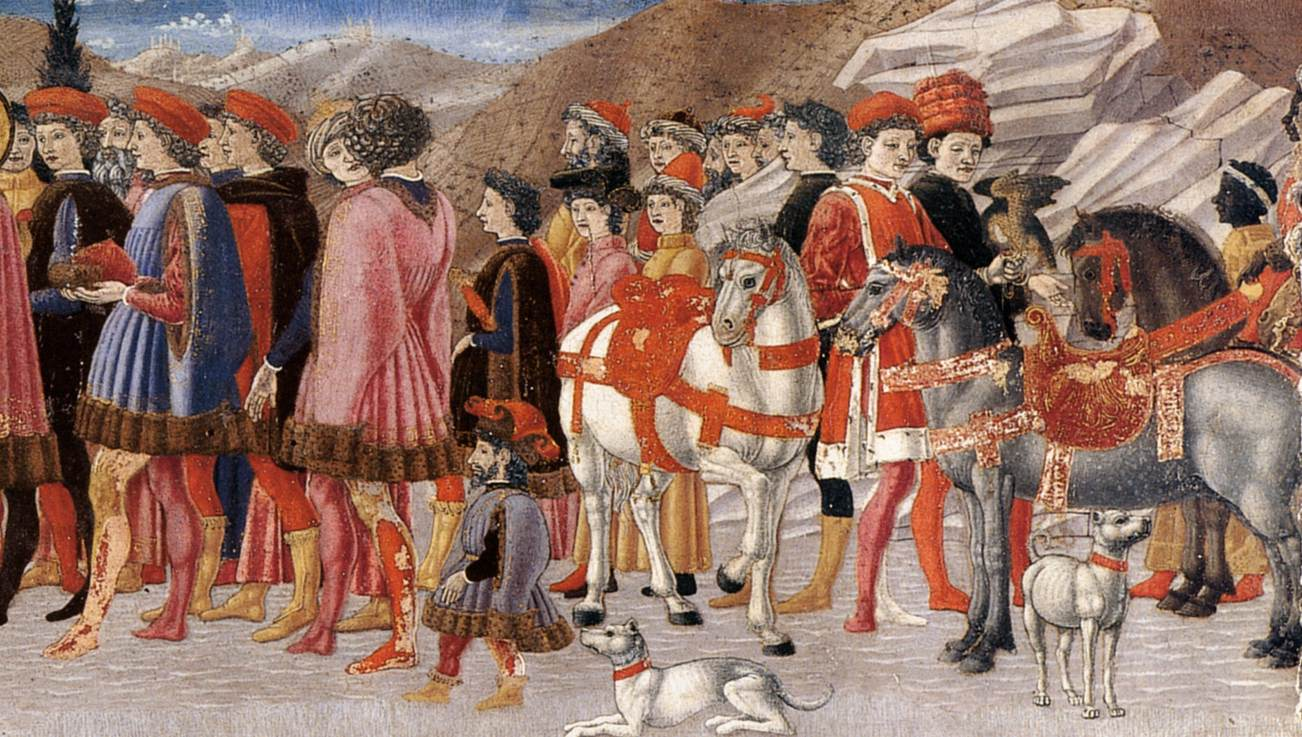
Nativity and Adoration of the Magi (detail), 1455-1459?

Giovanni di Francesco del Cervelliera or Giovanni di Francesco (1412 – September 28, 1459) was an Italian Renaissance painter, active in Florence in the mid-fifteenth century.

== Biography ==
Giovanni di Francesco was born in Florence. A land registry document of 1435 in which Giovanni gave his age as 23 provides the evidence for his birthdate. Giovanni was the nephew of Giuliano di Jacopo Lorino and the cousin of Jacopo di Antonio, both painters. According to Vasari, the two cousins were pupils to Andrea del Castagno, but Anna Padoa Rizzo says "this should be discounted as Castagno was ten years younger than Giovanni di Francesco".

In 1450 Giovanni di Francesco accused Fra Filippo Lippi of failure to pay him for his collaborative work in the restoration of a painting of Giotto. The two worked together again in 1455.

In 1440, Giovanni di Francesco finished painting Madonna and Child with Saint Bridget and Saint Michael (J. Paul Getty Museum, Los Angeles) for the Brigittine Convento near Florence, using the technique of tempera on panel. Around 1450, Giovanni finished Madonna and Child with Angels, also in tempera on panel. The original location of the painting is unknown, but it is now housed in the Galleria degli Uffizi in Florence. Between 1455 and 1459, Giovanni painted Nativity and Adoration of the Magi as a predella, or part of a predella, of an unidentified altarpiece. It is now housed in the Musée du Louvre in Paris.

Giovanni di Francesco del Cervelliera died on September 28, 1459, and was buried in the church of San Ambrogio.

== Style ==
Giovanni di Francesco worked primarily with tempera on panel to create his paintings, panels, triptychs and altarpieces. His early works show an interest in perspective, clarity of outline, and strongly characterized facial expressions that reveal the influence of Uccello. The influence of Fra Lippo Lippi's work is evident in Adoration of the Magi and SS James and Anthony Abbot Blessing a Donor. Giovanni's style was also influenced by Domenico Veneziano and, to some extent, by Piero della Francesca. His later works, such as the Carrand Triptych, show less of a classicizing tendency, and suggest the influence of Castagno.

=== Carrand Triptych ===
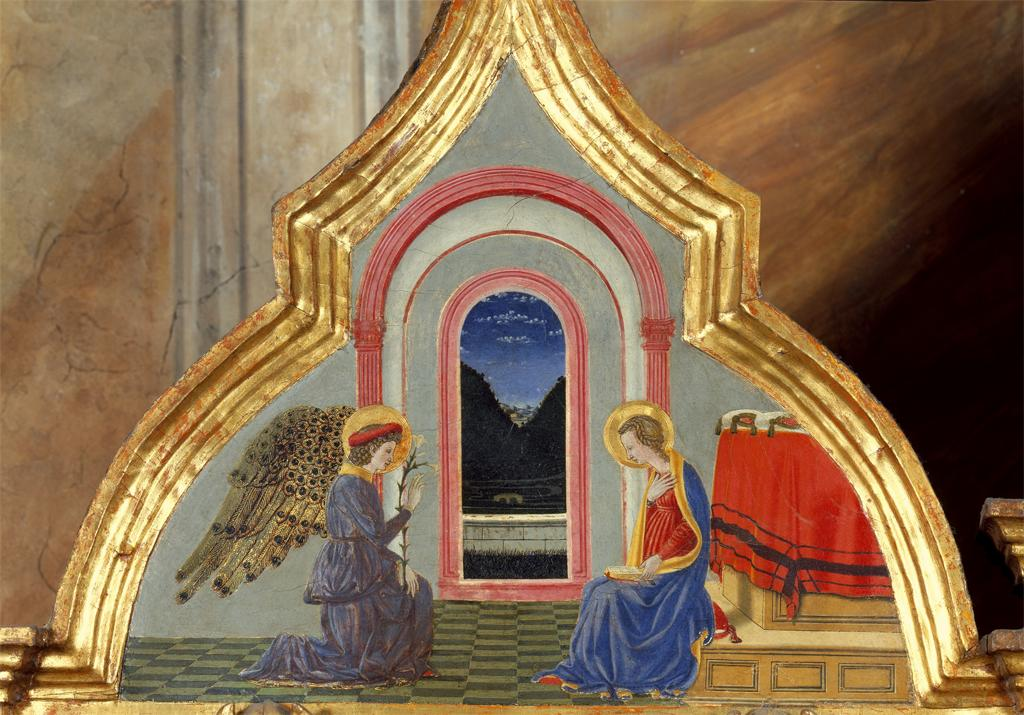
Detail of the Carrand Triptych

In the centuries after his death, the artistic identity of Giovanni di Francesco was nearly forgotten. The Carrand Triptych (formerly in the Carrand collection; now in the Bargello, Florence), representing the Virgin and Child with SS Francis, John the Baptist, Nicholas and Peter, was a key work in his modern rediscovery. The triptych, and a number of works evidently by the same hand, were attributed to an artist known only as the Master of the Carrand Triptych until 1917, when Pietro Toesca identified the Master of the Carrand Triptych as Giovanni di Francesco, on the evidence of a document concerning payment for a fresco in the church of the Ospedale degli Innocenti in Florence.

== Selected works ==
- Carrand Triptych - Museo nazionale del Bargello
- Nativity and Adoration of the Magi - Musée du Louvre
- Madonna and Child with Angels - Galleria degli Uffizi
- Madonna and Child with Saint Bridget and Saint Michael - J. Paul Getty Museum
- Pratovecchio Altarpiece (disputed)
- Hunting Scene, Musée des Augustins de Toulouse

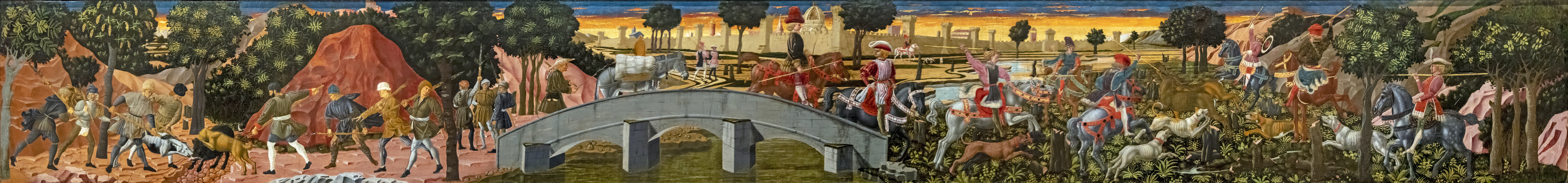
Hunting Scene, Musée des Augustins de Toulouse
