= Life of Christ (Giotto) =

Series of seven paintings by Giotto

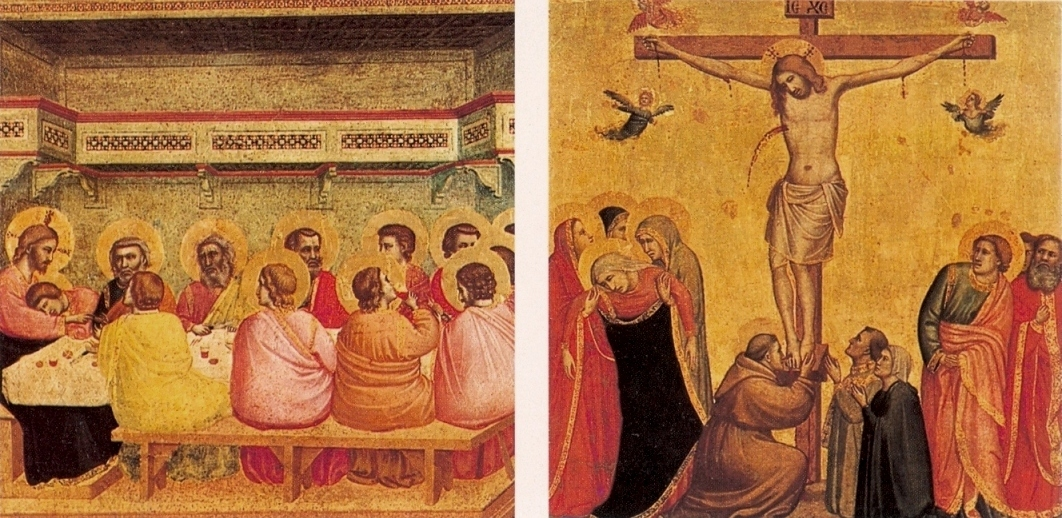
Two of the works in Munich, the Last Supper and the Crucifixion

The Life of Christ is a series of seven paintings in tempera and gold on panel, attributed to Giotto and dating to around 1320–1325. Depicting the Nativity and Passion of Christ, and Pentecost, they are now housed in a number of museums: three are in the Alte Pinakothek in Munich, and the Metropolitan Museum of Art in New York, the Isabella Stewart Gardner Museum in Boston, the Berenson Collection in Settignano and the National Gallery in London all have one each.

== List ==
Image	Title	Dimensions	Country	City	Collection	Attribution and notes
	Adoration of the Magi	44 × 45 cm	United States	New York City	Metropolitan Museum of Art	
	Presentation in the Temple	44 × 43 cm	United States	Boston	Isabella Stewart Gardner Museum	Acquired by Jean Paul Richter in 1900 on the advice of Bernard Berenson; one of the best of the group.
	Last Supper	42.56 × 43 cm	Germany	Munich	Alte Pinakothek	Acquired from a private collection by Maximilian I of Bavaria in 1805.
	Crucifixion	45 × 43.5 cm	Germany	Munich	Alte Pinakothek	Acquired by Ludwig I of Bavaria in 1813.
	Deposition	44.5 × 43 cm	Italy	Florence	Villa I Tatti (Berenson Collection)	
	Descent into Limbo	45 × 43.5 cm	Germany	Munich	Alte Pinakothek	Similar provenance to Crucifixion.
	Pentecost	45 × 43.5 cm	United Kingdom	London	National Gallery	Donated in 1942; one of the best in the series.

== See also ==
- Life of Christ Museum
- Life of Jesus

== Bibliography ==
- Baccheschi, Edi (1977), L'opera completa di Giotto (in Italian), Milan: Rizzoli [ISBN unspecified]
- AA.VV. (1986), Alte Pinakothek Munich, Munich: Edition Lipp, ISBN 978-3-87490-701-9
- Syre, Cornelia (2007), Alte Pinakothek. Italienische Malerei (in German), Ostfilnder: Hantje Cantz, ISBN 978-3-7757-1840-0
- Bellosi, Luciano (2003), "Giotto", Dal Gotico al Rinascimento (in Italian), Florence: Scala, ISBN 88-8117-092-2
