= William Suida =

Austrian art historian and art collector

William Suida, born Wilhelm Emil Suida (April 26, 1877 – October 29, 1959) was an Austrian art historian and art collector and "one of the greatest connoisseurs of Italian art." He published books and essays in multiple languages about numerous artists and schools of art. He and his heirs amassed a large private collection that in 1999 was acquired by the Blanton Museum of Art in Austin, where many paintings from the Suida-Manning Collection are on permanent display.

== In Europe ==
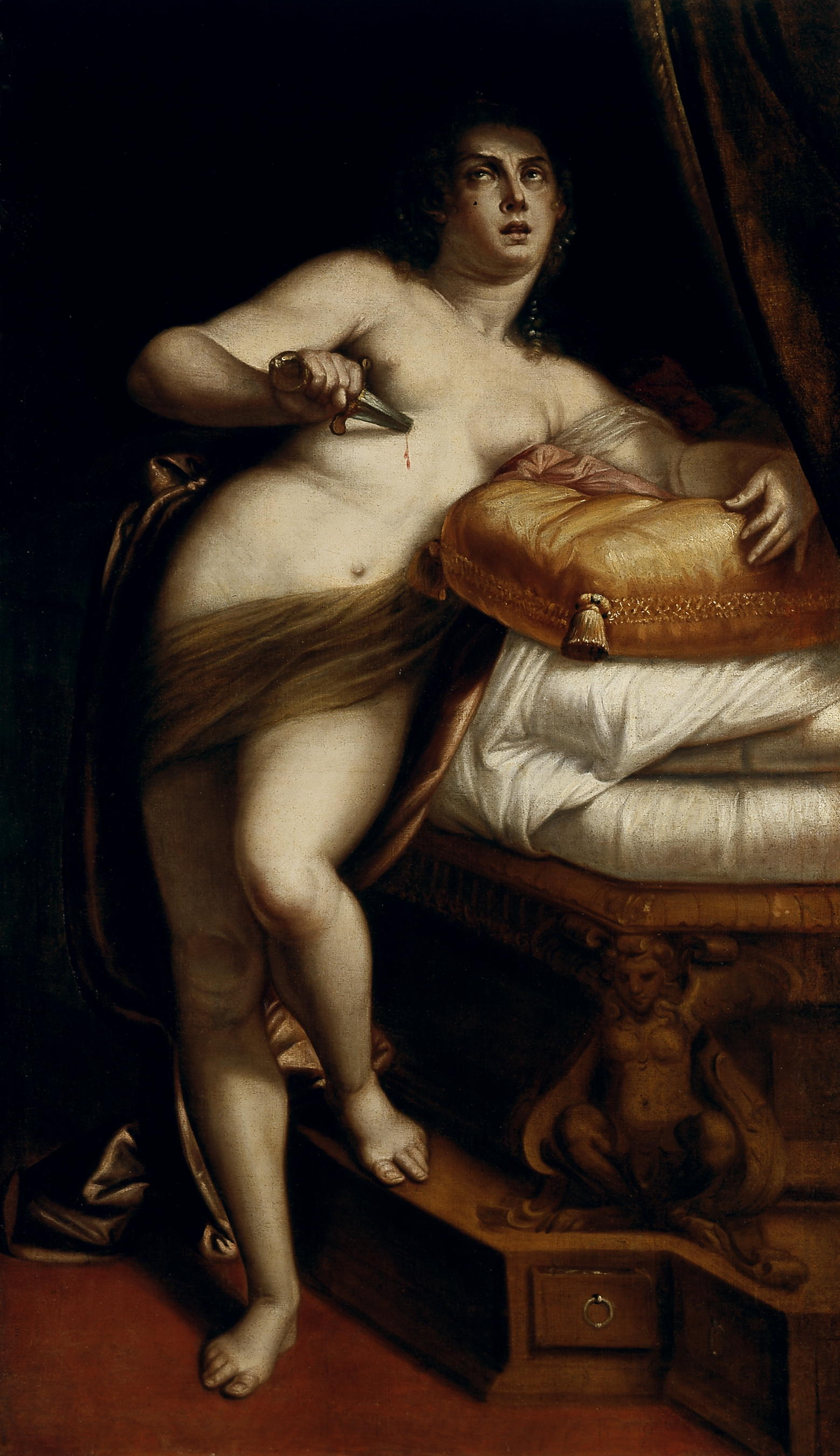
Suicide of Lucretia (c. 1575) by Luca Cambiaso, from the Suida-Manning Collection at the Blanton Museum of Art.

Suida was born in Neunkirchen, Austria, the son of Albert Suida and Bertha von Heim, a relative of Richard Wagner. His uncle was the art historian Henry Thode, with whom he studied in Heidelberg and under whom he wrote his dissertation, published in 1900 as Die Genredarstellungen Albrecht Dürer. In 1902 he began a two-year residence in Florence as an assistant at the Deutsches Kunsthistorisches Institut. His research there resulted in his 1905 book on Florentine Trecento painting, Florentinische Maler um die Mitte des XIV Jahrhunderts.

On his return to Austria, he was appointed lecturer at the University of Vienna, then obtained the Chair of Art History at the University of Graz, a post he held until 1939. His academic career was interrupted by military service as a captain in the First World War. He became an expert on Raphael, Bramante, da Vinci, and Titian ("his favorite until the end"), and also on various regional schools of Italian painting, especially Ligurian, Lombard, and Venetian art.

With the annexation of Austria by the Nazis in 1939, he emigrated with his wife, Hermine, and their only child, Bertina, first to England and then to the United States.

== In the United States ==
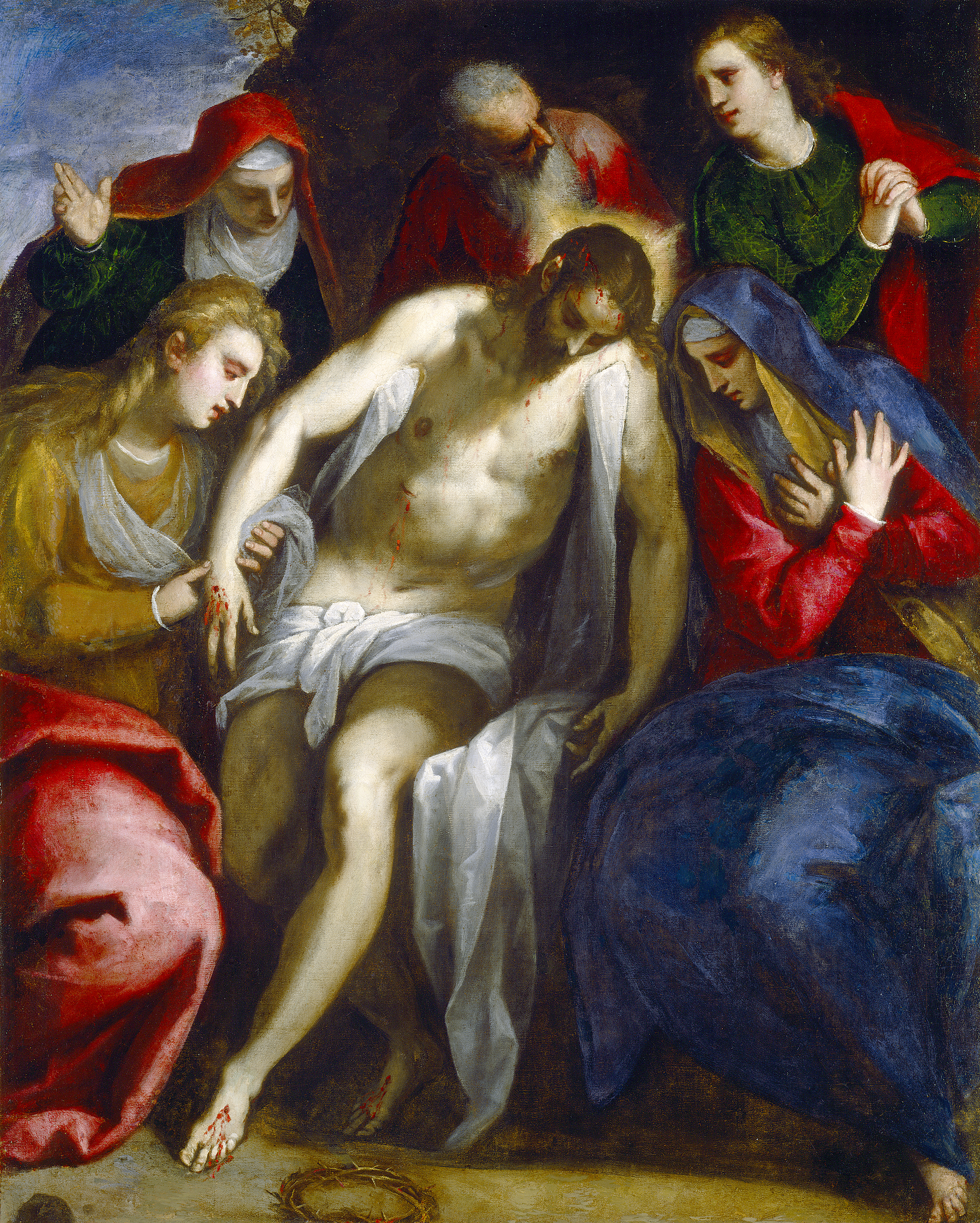
Jacopo Palma il Giovane, Lamentation (c. 1620), National Gallery of Art, a gift by the heirs of William Suida in his memory, in honor of the Gallery's 50th Anniversary.

In 1947 Suida became director of the art history department of the Kress Foundation in New York, advising entrepreneur Samuel Henry Kress on art purchases and later helping to disperse the collection to museums across the United States, including the National Gallery of Art in Washington, D.C.

His daughter, Bertina, studied art history at New York University Institute of Fine Arts, where she met and married fellow art history student Robert Lee Manning. The elder Suida gave his son-in-law a position as curator for the Kress collection. Bertina was a curator at the Chrysler Collection. Through their own purchases, William and his daughter and son-in-law amassed a private collection of hundreds of European paintings and works on paper.

William Suida died in New York in 1959. Bertina Suida Manning died in 1992, and Robert Manning in 1996. In 1999 their son-in-law and daughter, Kurt and Alessandra Manning Dolnier, made a partial gift of the Suida-Manning Collection to the Blanton Museum of Art at the University of Texas at Austin.

== Publications ==
Suida wrote works in German, Italian, French, and English, including the books Leonardo und sein Kreis (Munich: F. Bruckmann, 1929), Pittura del Rinascimento nel Canton Ticino (Milan, 1932), Tiziano (Roma: Valori Plastici, 1933; also in German as Tizian, 1933, and in French as Le Titien, 1935), Bramante pittore e il Bramantino (Milan: Ceschina, 1953), and, in collaboration with his daughter Bertina, a pioneering biographical and critical study of the 16th-century Genoese painter, Luca Cambiaso: la vita e le opere (Milan: Ceschina, 1957).

He also wrote many monographs and essays, and catalogued numerous art collections.

In 1959 the Kress Foundation and Phaidon Press published Studies in the History of Art, Dedicated to William E. Suida on His Eightieth Birthday. The multilingual collection of essays by fifty contributors included an extensive 8-page bibliography of Suida's own writings, with hundreds of entries.

== The Suida-Manning Collection ==
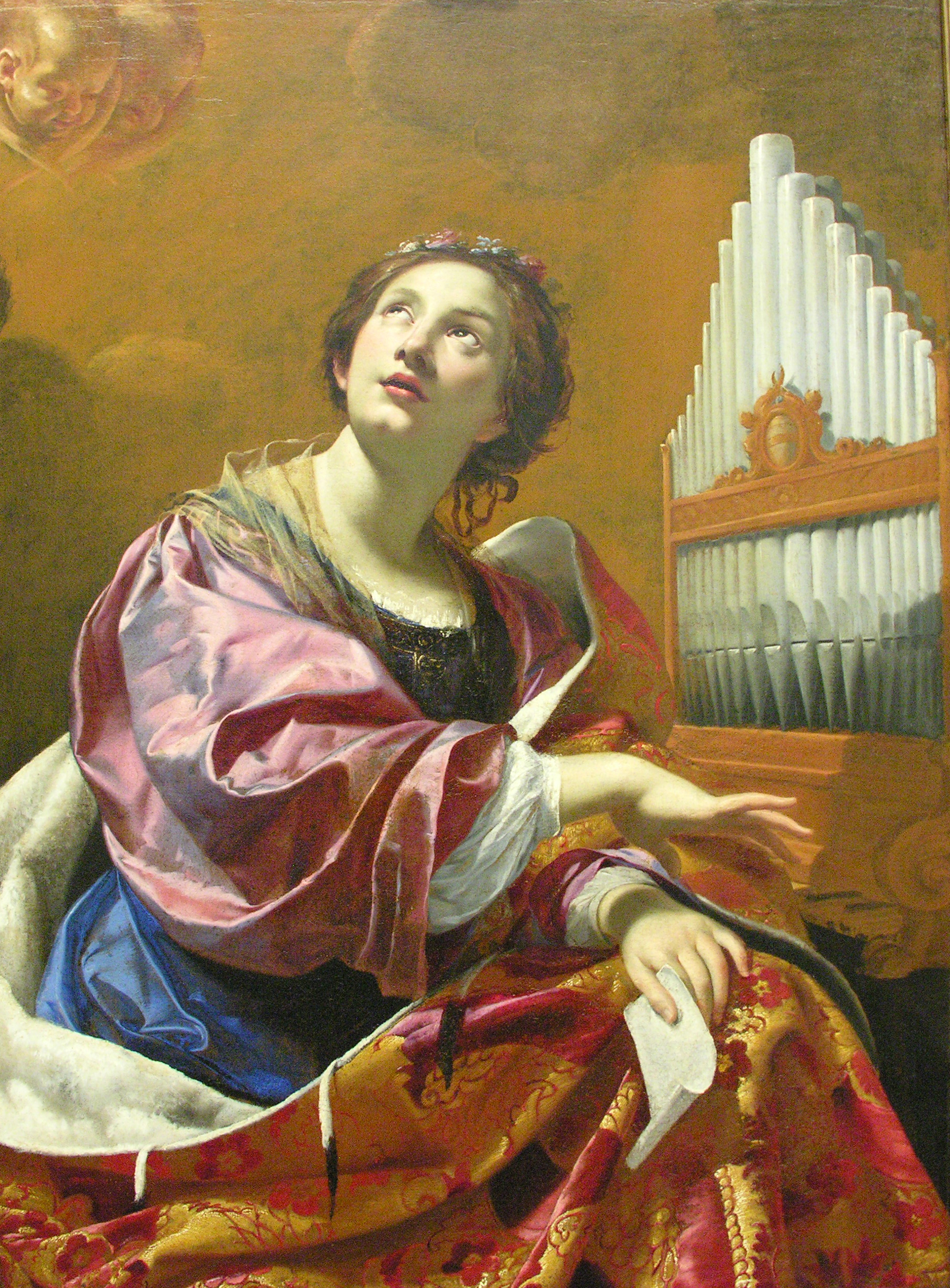
Saint Cecilia (c. 1626) by Simon Vouet, from the Suida-Manning Collection at the Blanton Museum of Art.

William Suida, Bertina Suida Manning, and Kurt Manning amassed one of the world's largest and most important collections of Old Master artwork in private hands, comprising some 250 paintings, 400 drawings and 50 sculptures, estimated in 1998 to be worth $30–35 million. It is said to be the eighth largest collection of Italian Old Master paintings outside Europe.

According to The New York Times, major works in the collection include The Conversion of St. Paul, painted by Daniele Crespi about 1621, considered to be the artist's finest painting in the United States; Sebastiano del Piombo's Portrait of a Man from about 1516, a rare example of a High Renaissance portrait; Sebastiano Ricci's mythological Flora, c. 1712–1716; a very early work by Claude Lorrain, Pastoral Landscape, from 1628–1630; and Tiepolo's Storyteller, from the mid-1770s, part of a famous series depicting 18th-century Venice. Other highlights include Claude Vignon's David with the Head of Goliath, c. 1620–1623; Simon Vouet’s Saint Cecilia, c. 1626; and three paintings by Guercino, including Landscape With Tobias and Angel, c. 1616–1617 (acquired by the Mannings unattributed at a Viennese antique shop "for little more than the value of its antique gilt frame.")

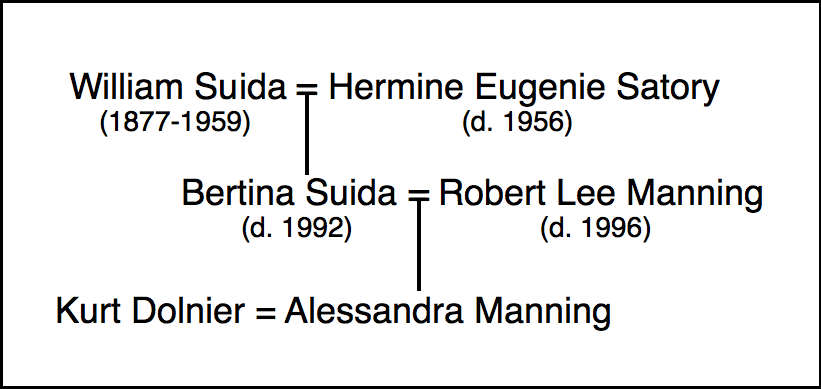
Family tree of the creators and owners of the Suida-Manning Collection of art.

The Suidas were the foremost experts on the works of the Mannerist painter Luca Cambiaso, and collected seven paintings and several drawings by him, making theirs the most important repository of Cambiaso's work outside his native Genoa.

The collection also includes works by Rubens, François Boucher, Correggio and many other Italian, French, German, Austrian, Dutch, and Flemish artists of the 14th to the 18th centuries.

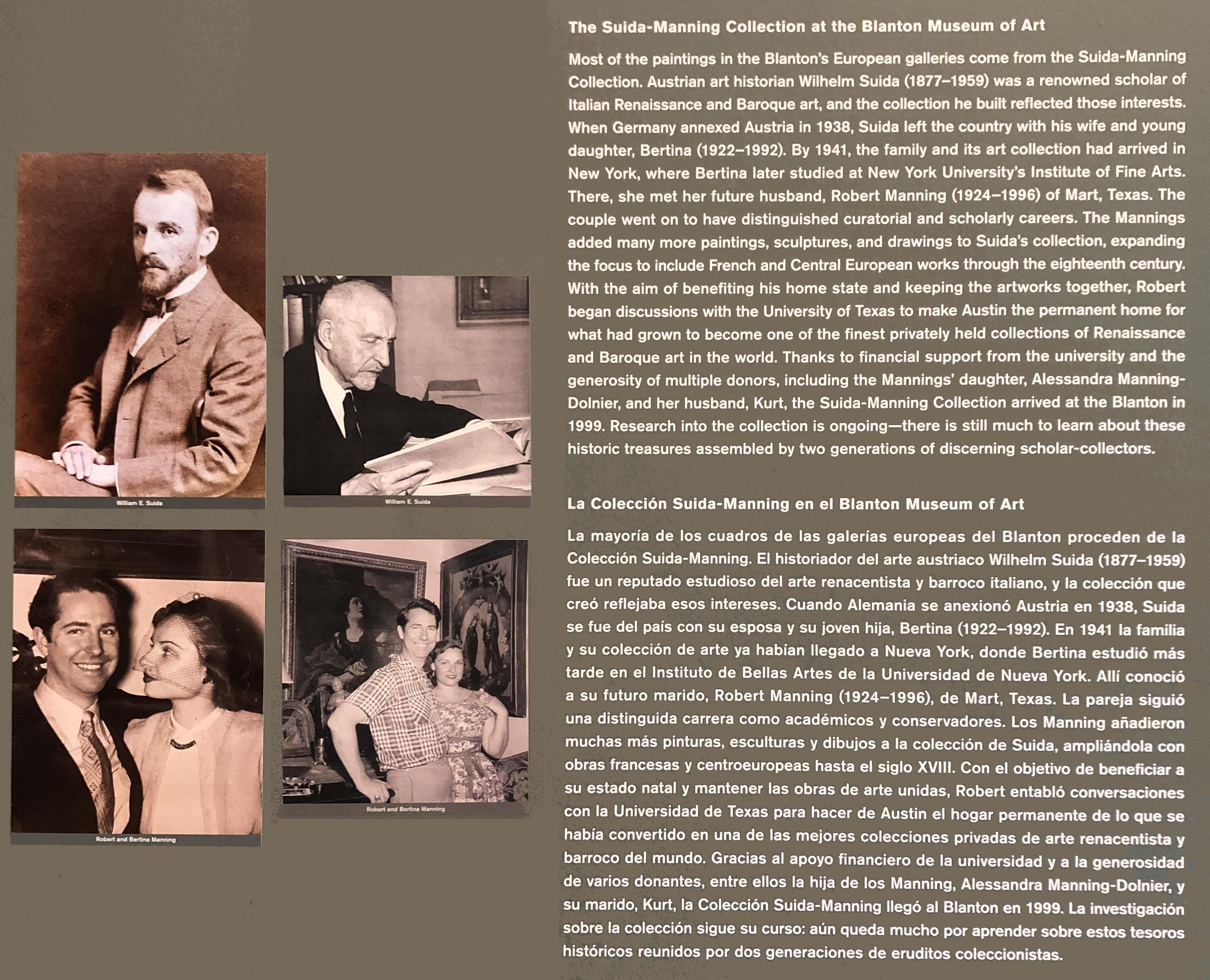
Blanton Museum wall label about the Suida-Manning collection.

Over the years, some works from the Suida-Manning Collection were donated to the Metropolitan Museum of Art, the Morgan Library, and other institutions; these include Jacopo Palma il Giovane's "Lamentation" (c. 1620), given "in memory of William E. Suida" to the National Gallery of Art in 1991.

In 1999 Kurt and Alessandra Manning Dolnier made a partial gift of the Suida-Manning Collection to the Blanton Museum of Art at the University of Texas at Austin. Sotheby's valued the collection at $30–35 million. Three anonymous donors contributed $4.75 million toward the acquisition, and the university pledged to raise $15 million to complete it. The Blanton was chosen in part because Robert Manning (born near Waco in the town of Mart) had wanted the collection to go to an institution in his native Texas, and also wanted it to be kept together. About 85 paintings from the Suida-Manning Collection are on permanent display in the museum's European art galleries.

== Suida-Manning Collection highlights ==
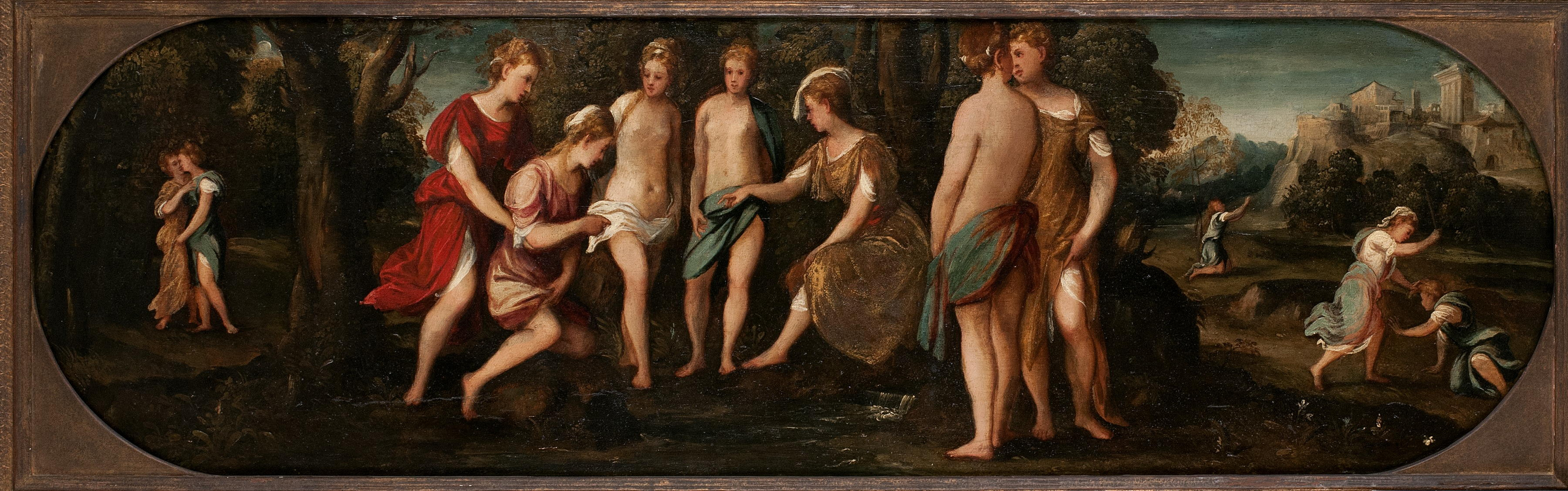
Diana and Callisto (1540s) by Andrea Schiavone, from the Suida-Manning Collection at the Blanton Museum of Art.

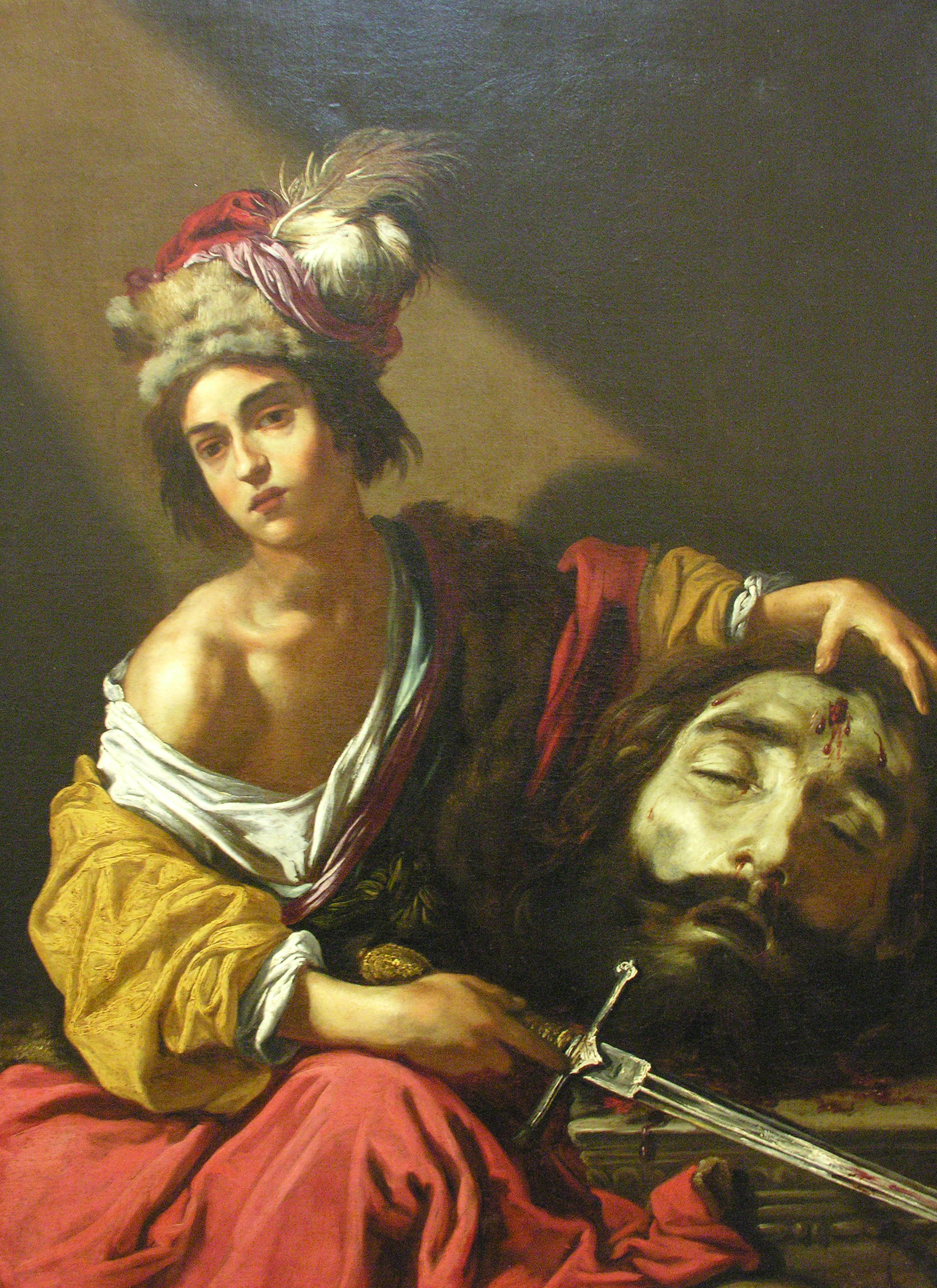
David with the Head of Goliath (c. 1620–1623) by Claude Vignon

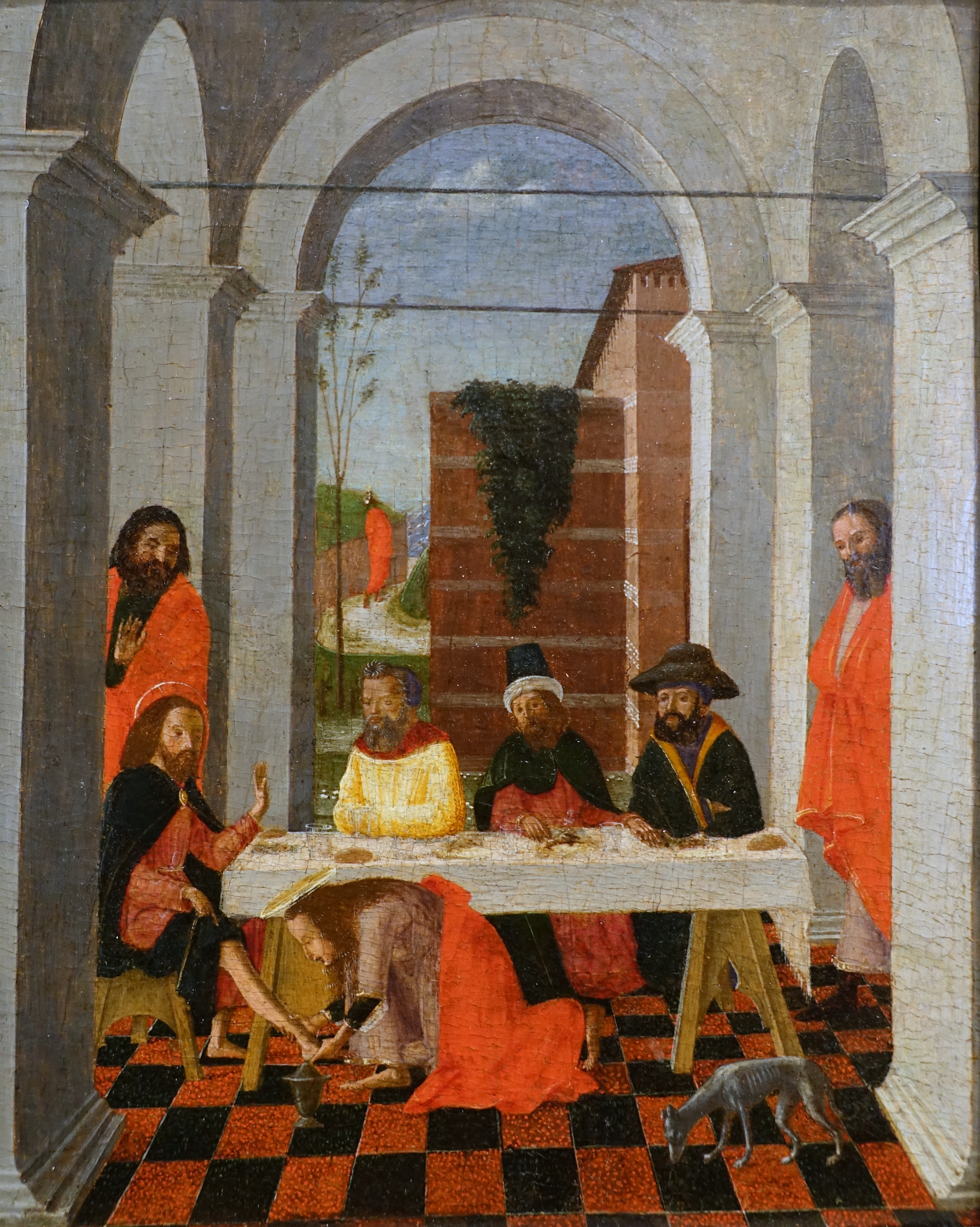
The Supper at Bethany (1490s) by Bernardino Butinone

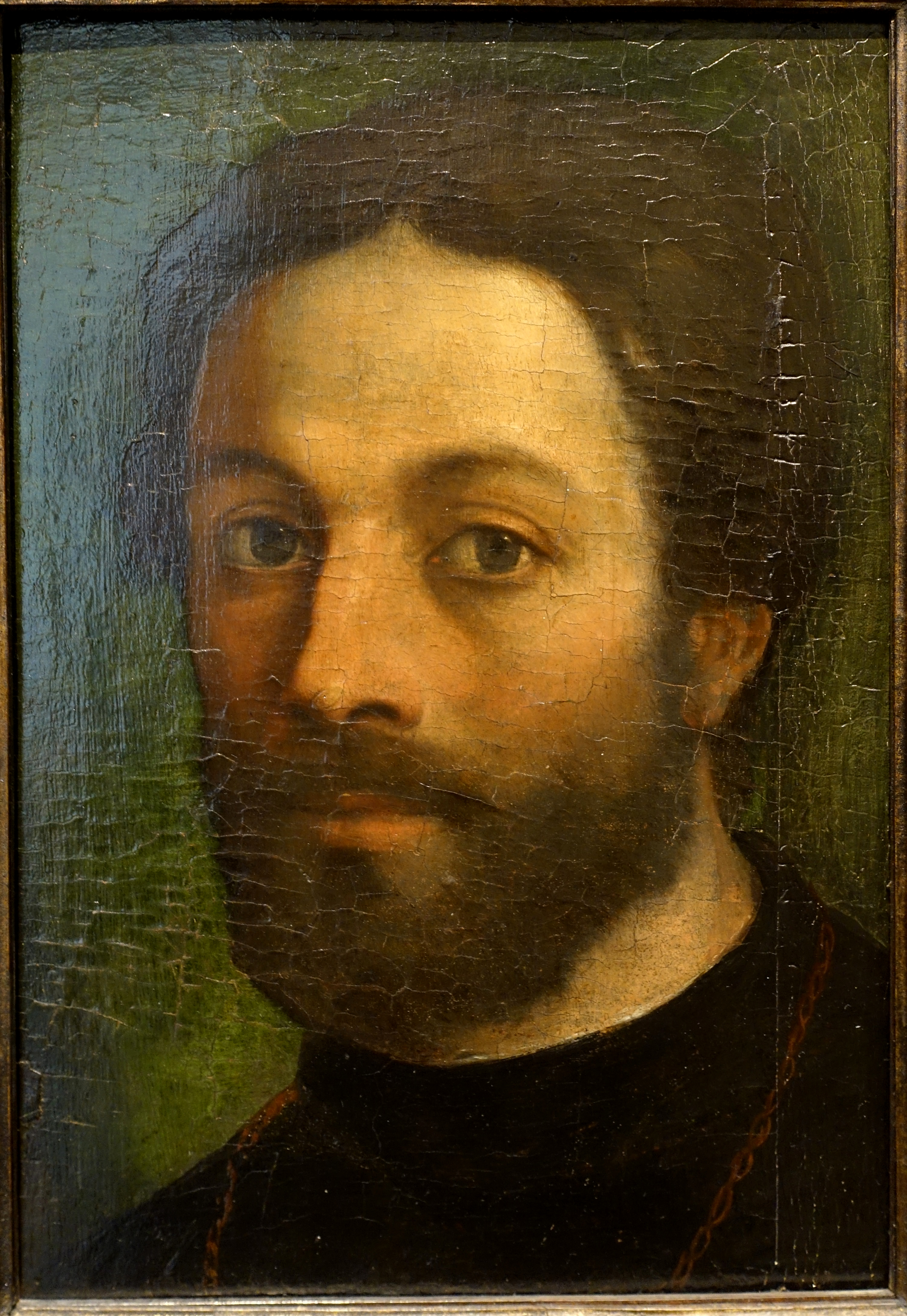
Portrait of a Man (c. 1516) by Sebastiano del Piombo

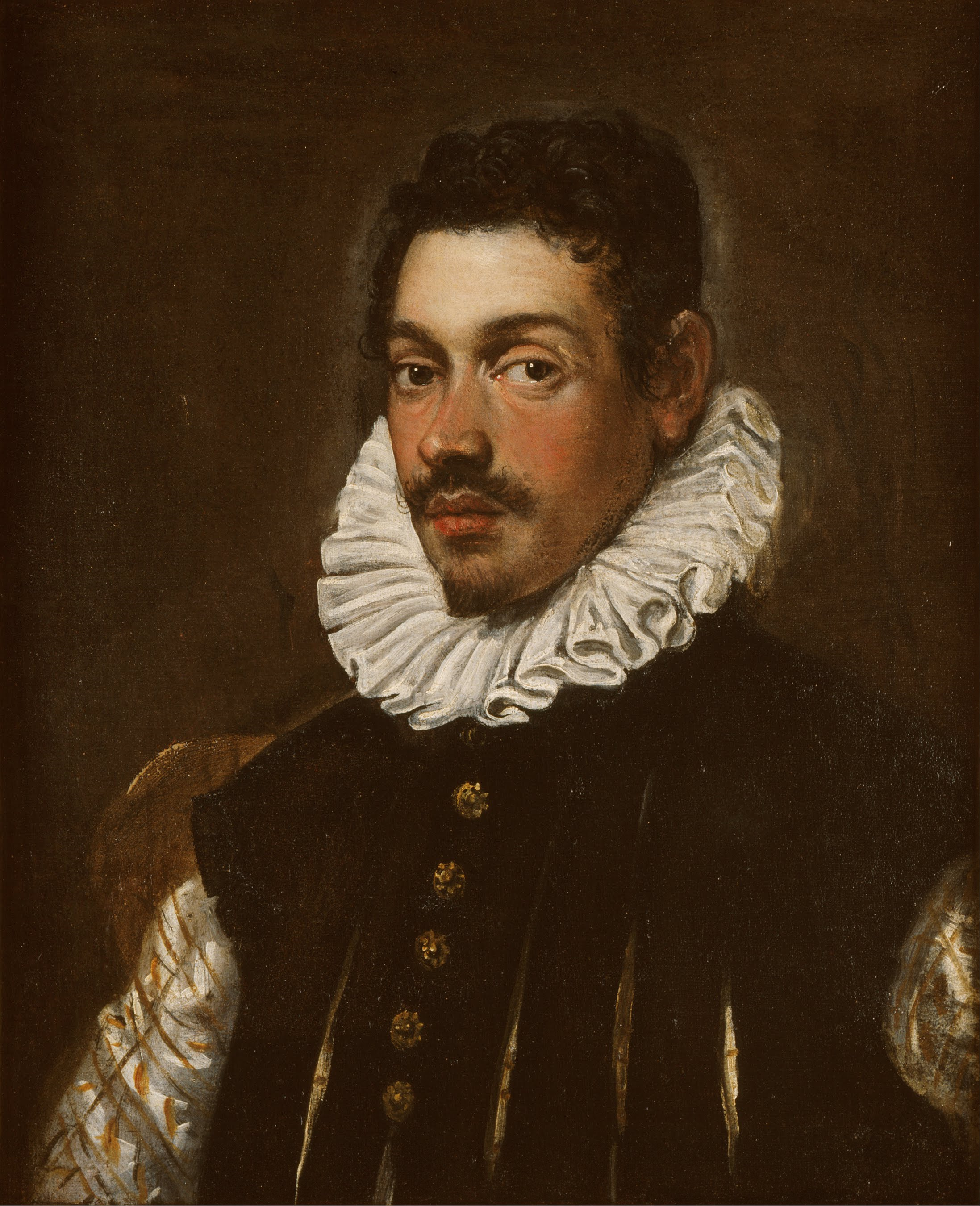
Portrait of a Gentleman (c. 1585-1590) by Tintoretto

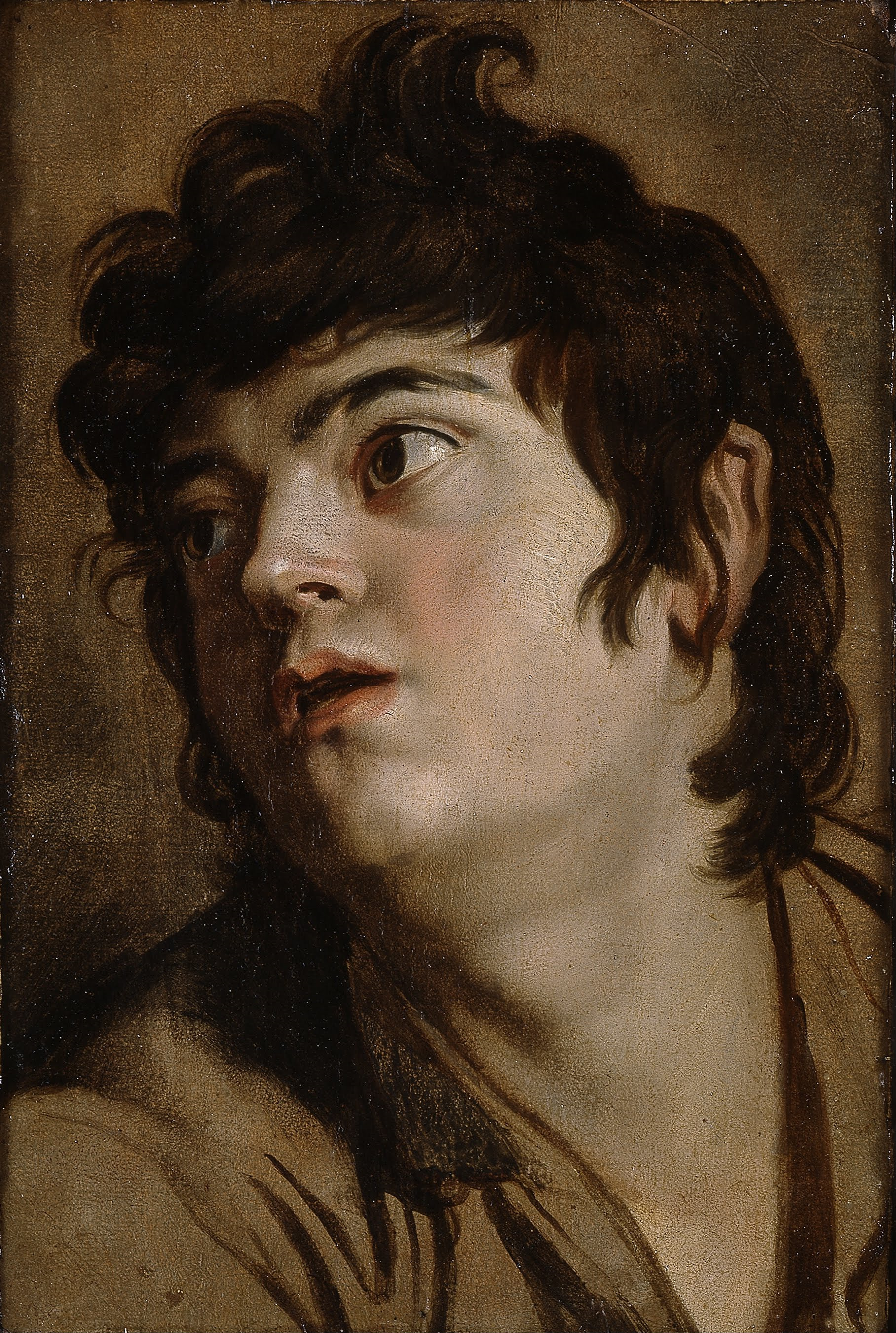
Head of a Young Man (1601-1602) by Peter Paul Rubens

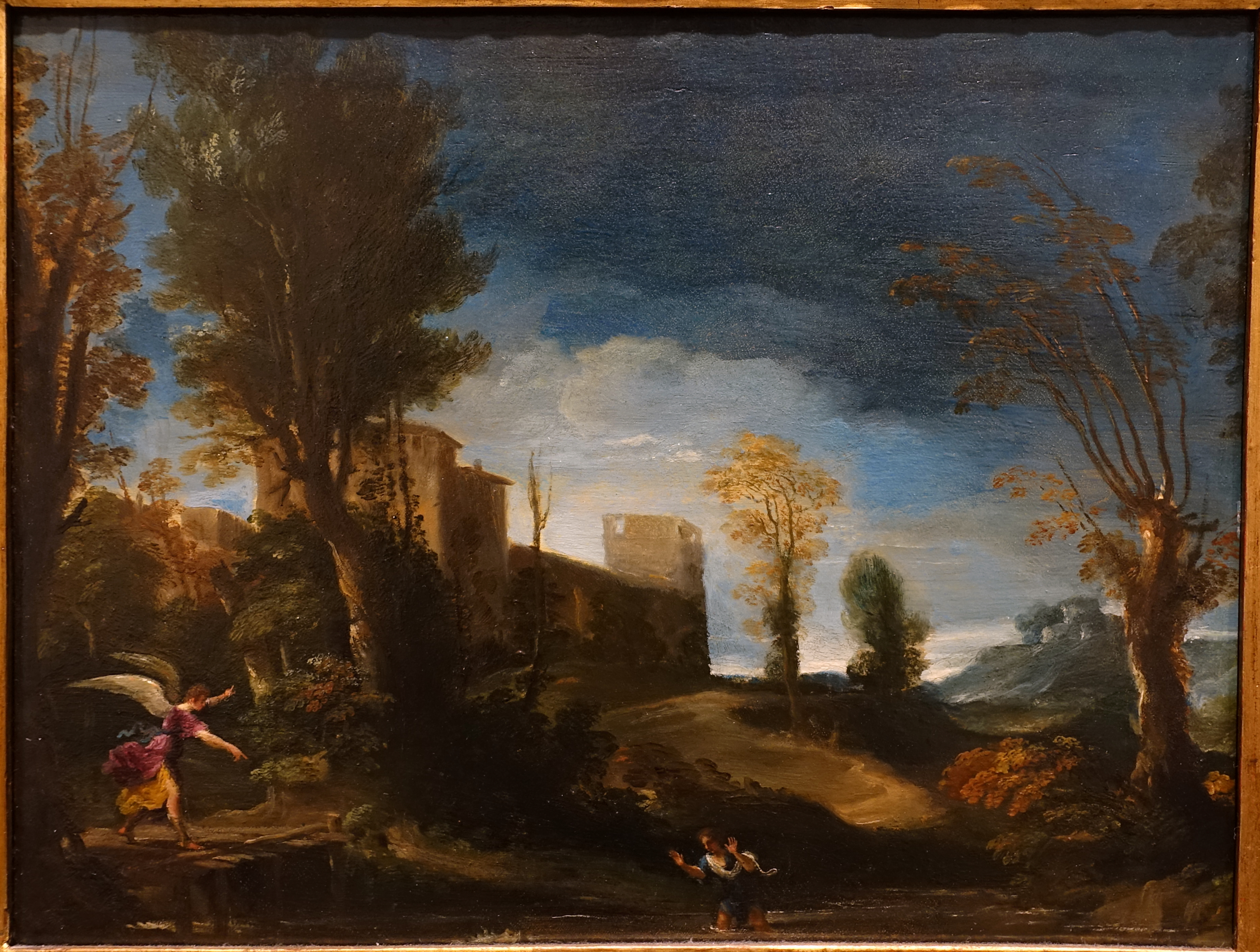
Landscape with Tobias and the Angel (c. 1616–1617) by Guercino

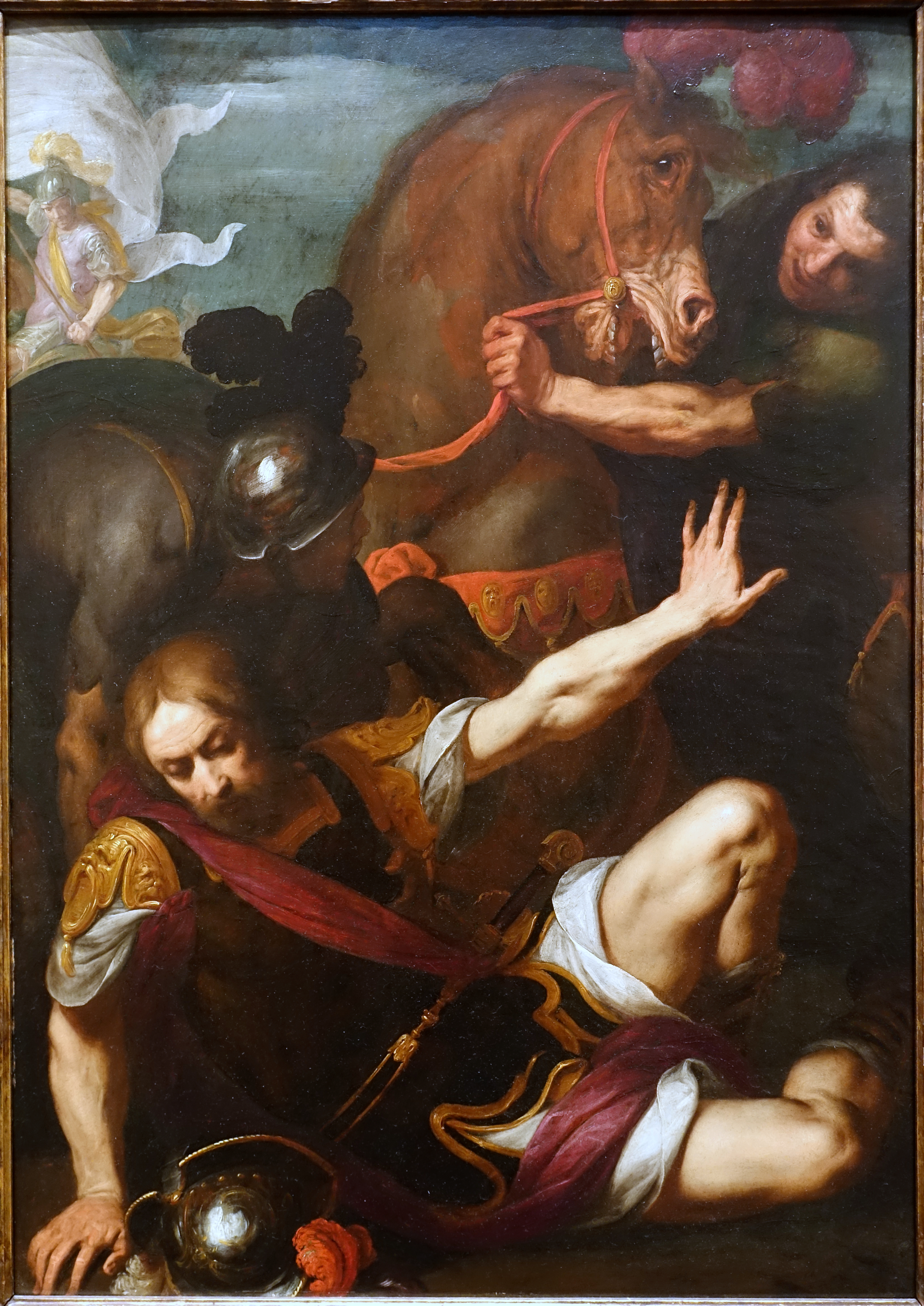
The Conversion of Saint Paul (c. 1621) by Daniele Crespi

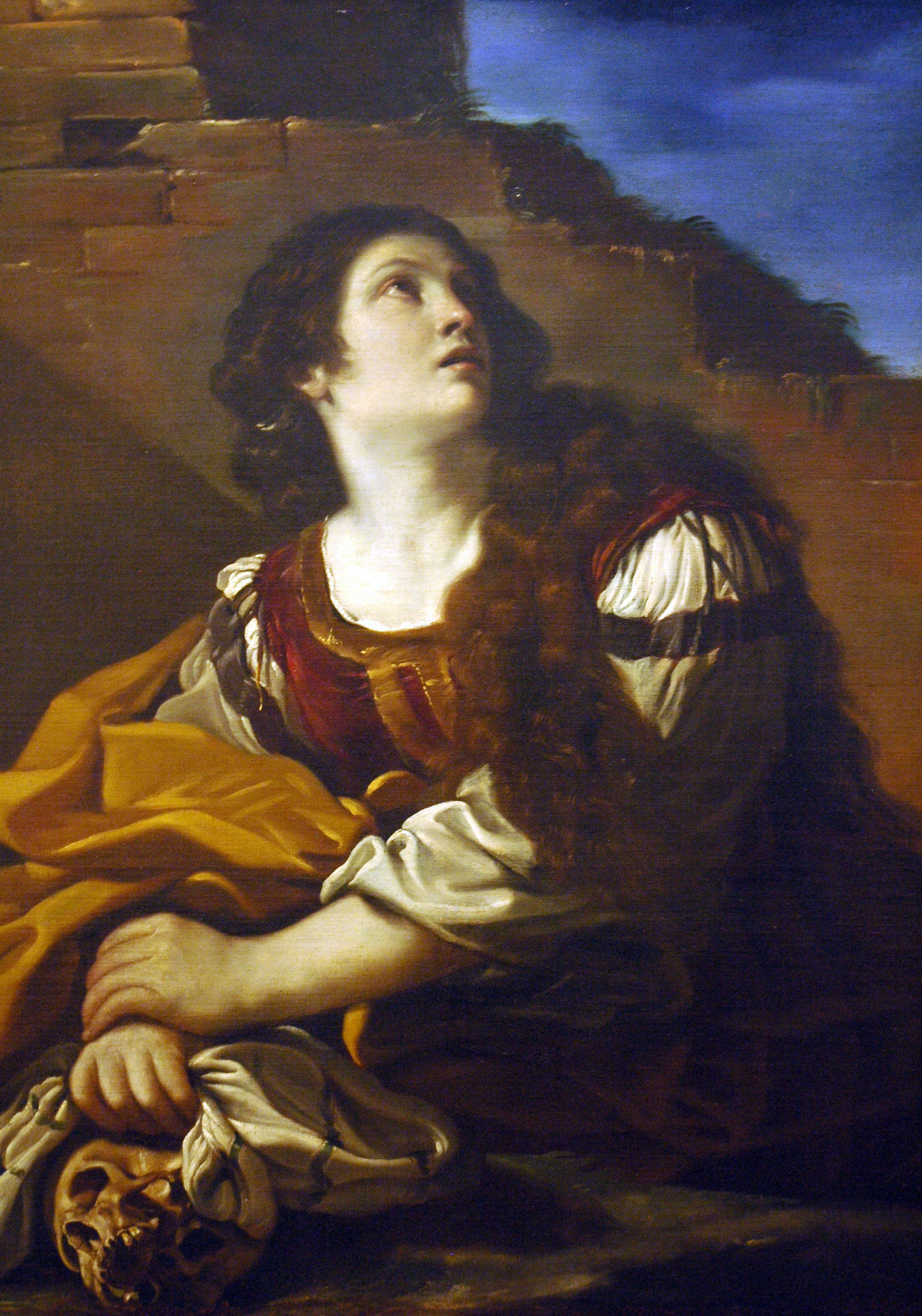
Saint Mary Magdalene (c. 1624–1625) by Guercino

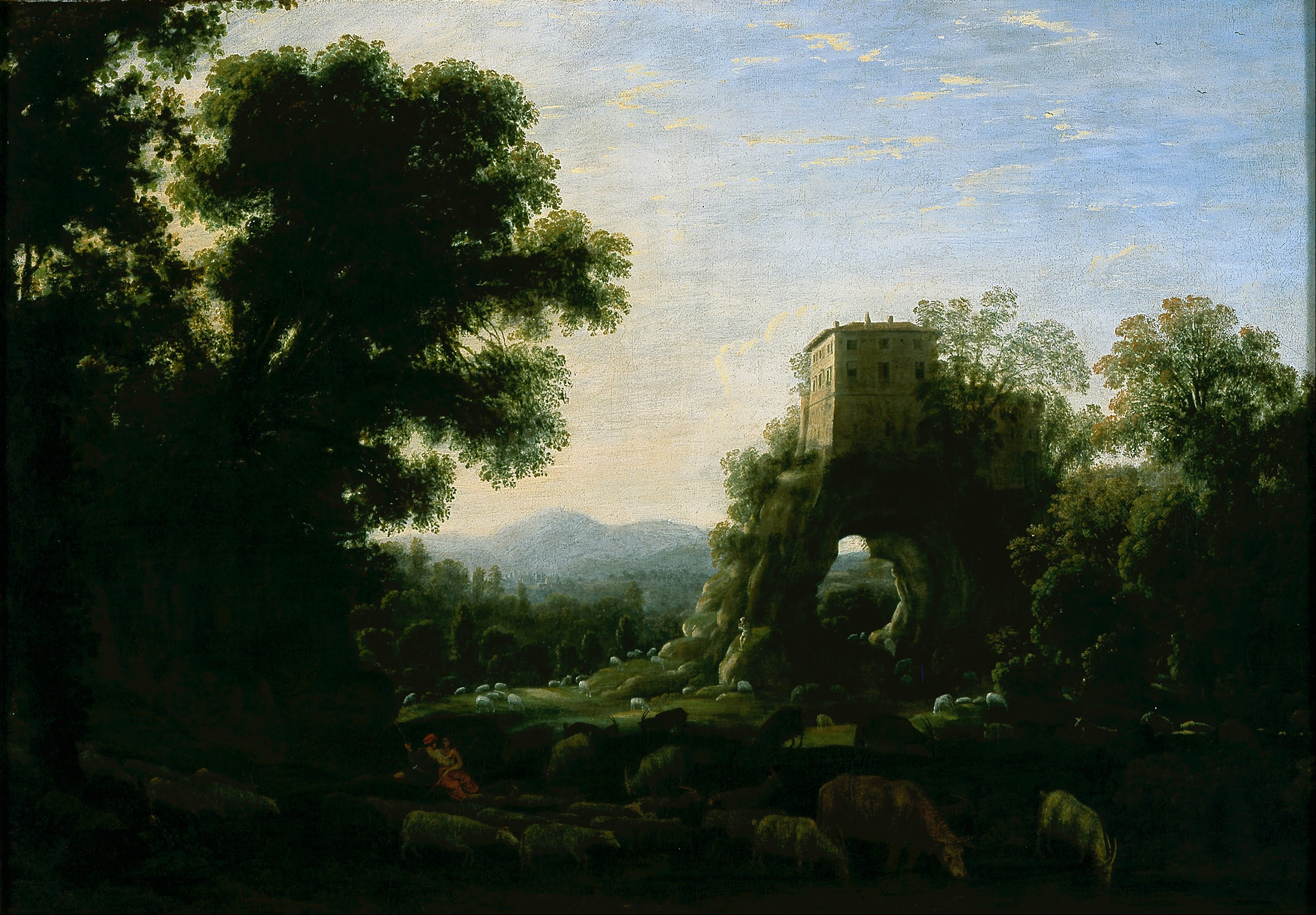
Pastoral Landscape (1628–1630) by Claude Lorrain

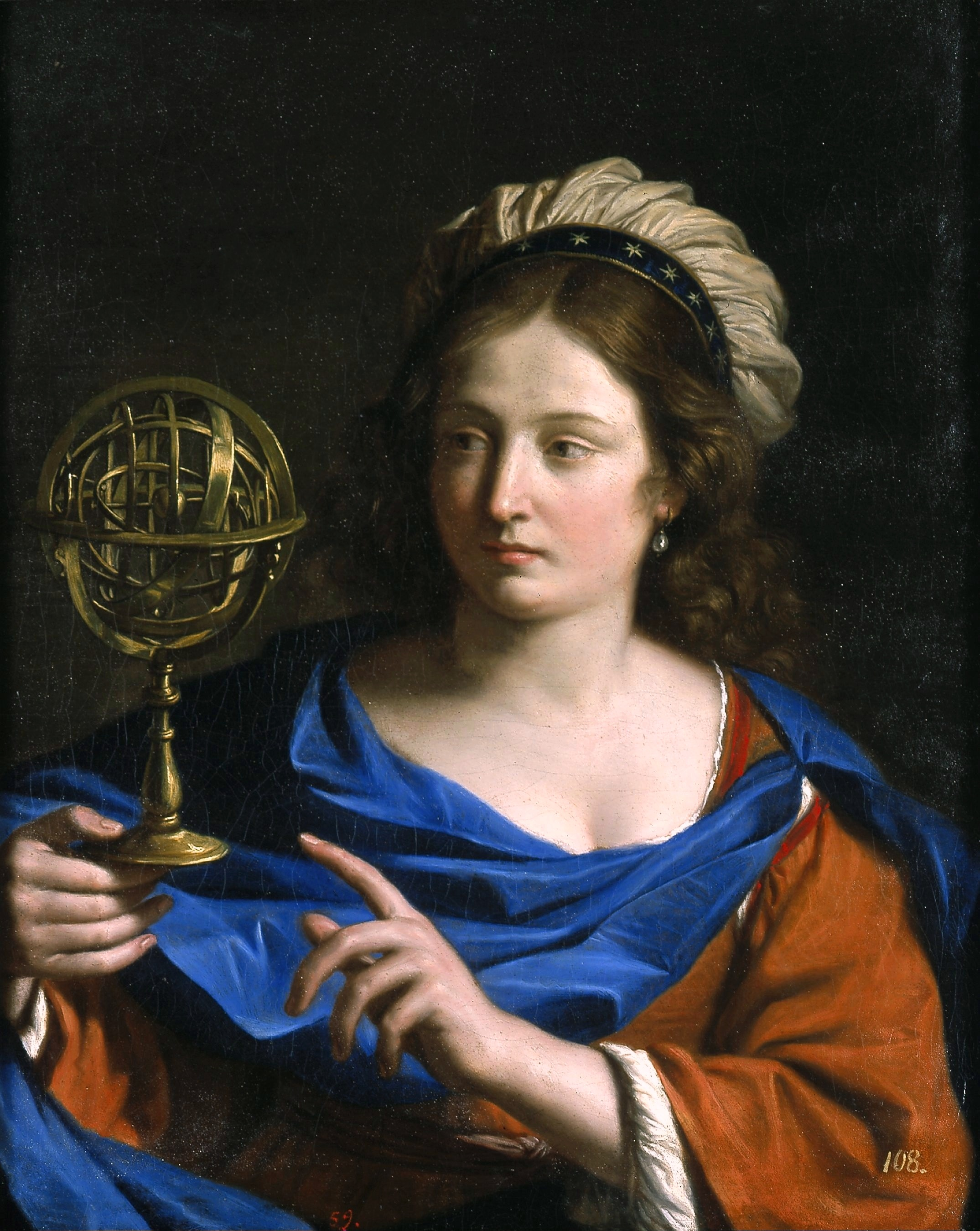
Personification of Astrology (c. 1650–1655) by Guercino

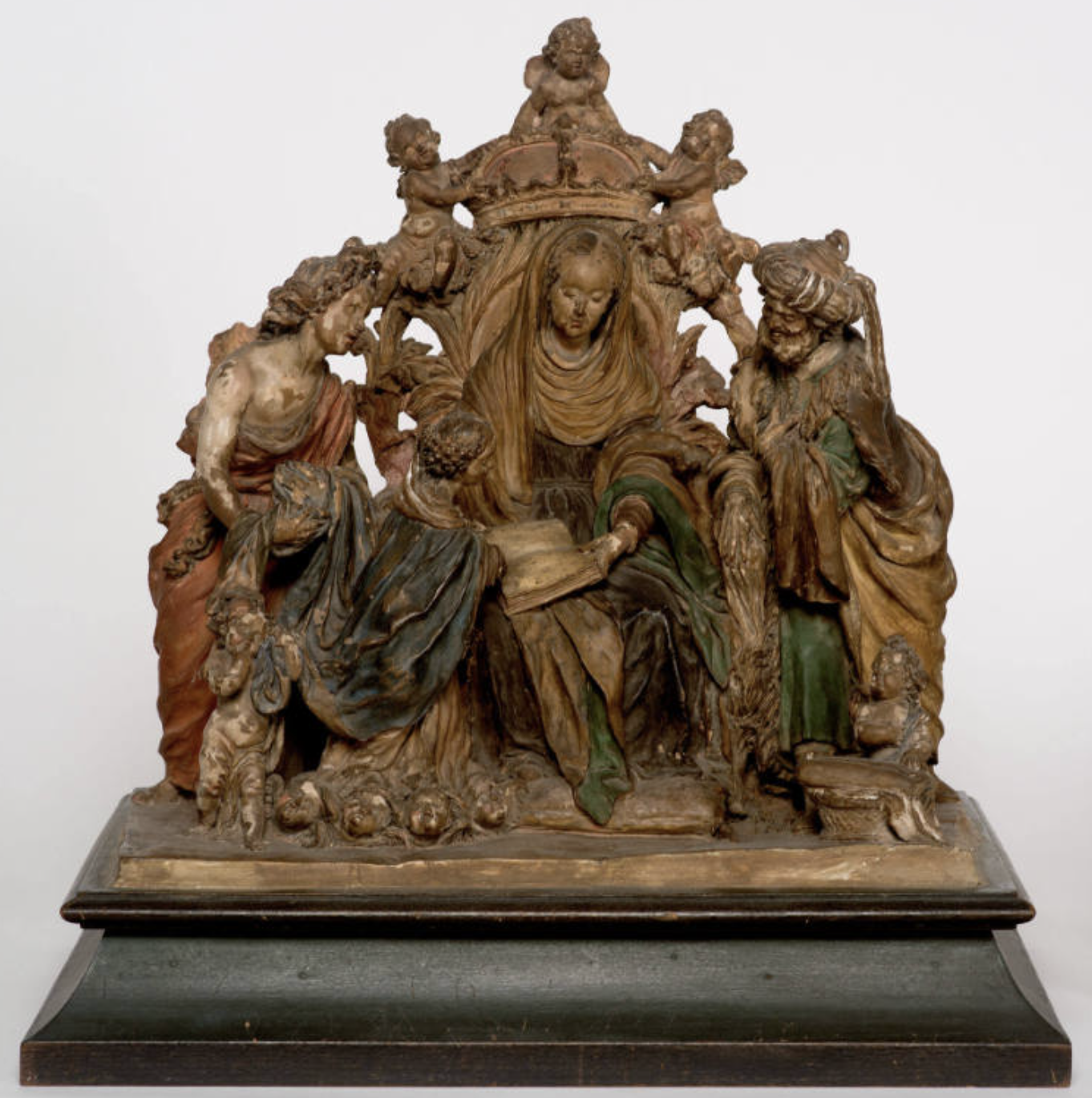
Education of the Virgin (polychrome terracotta, 1689-1706) by Luisa Roldán

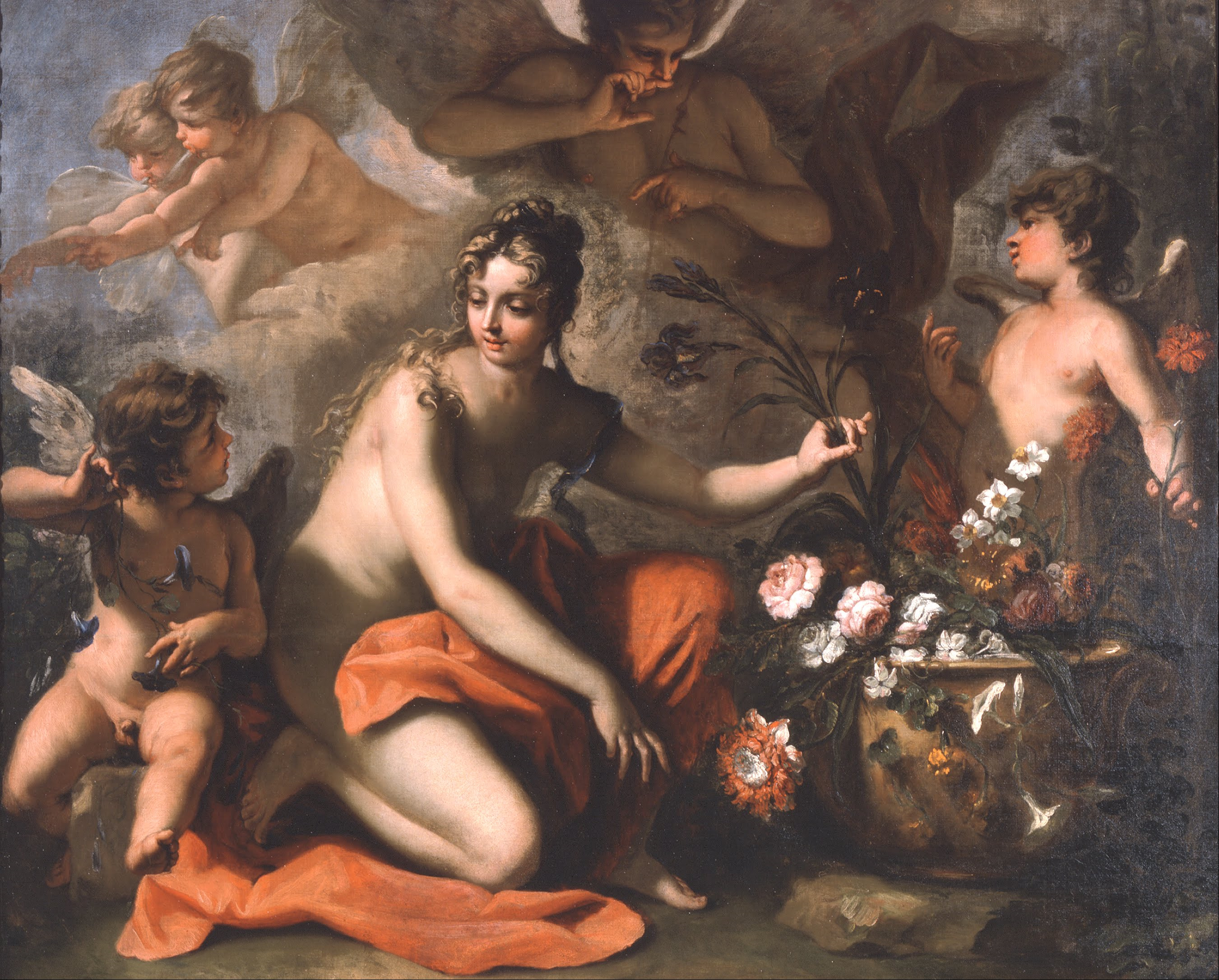
Flora (1712–1716) by Sebastiano Ricci

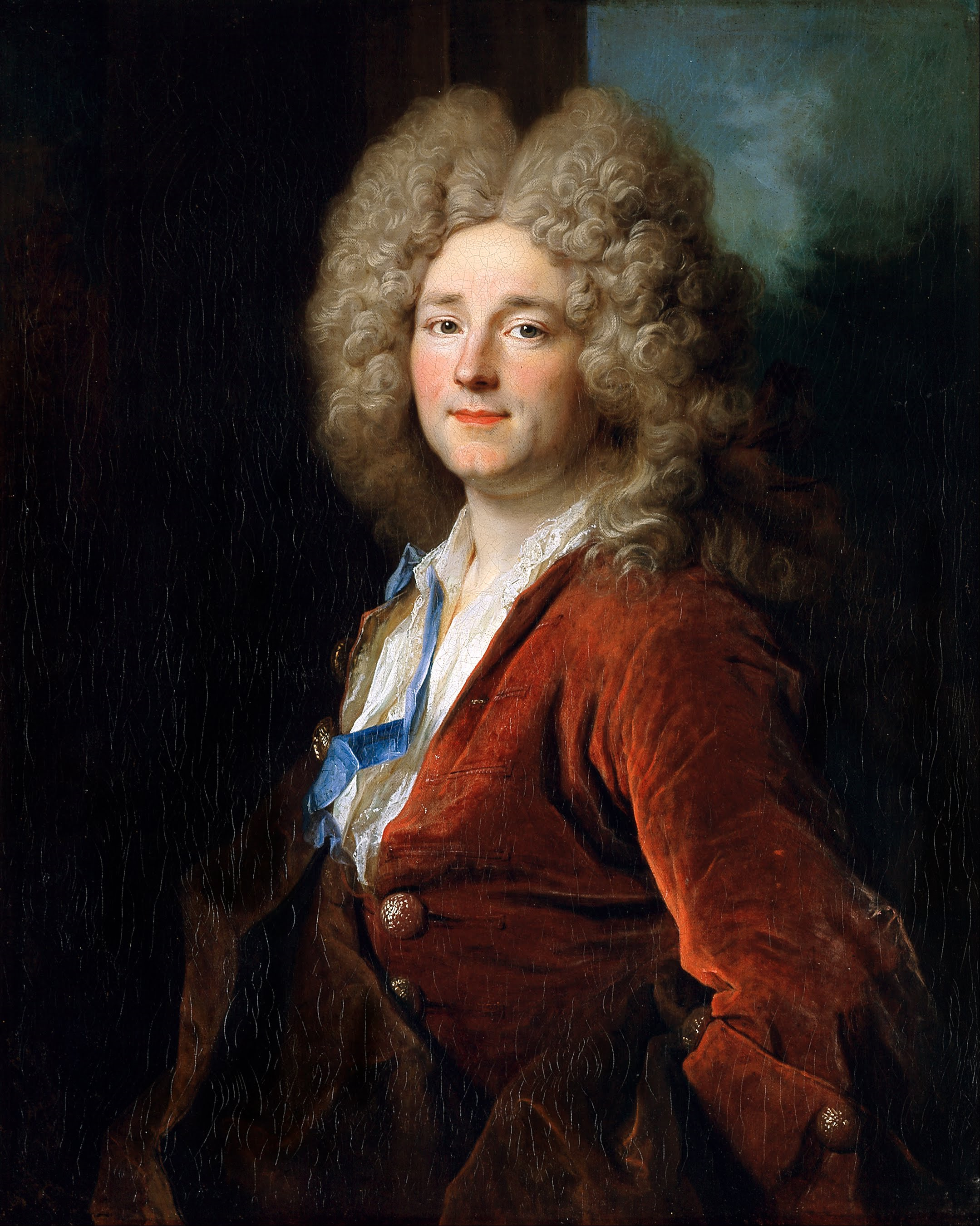
Portrait of a Man (c. 1715) by Nicolas de Largillière

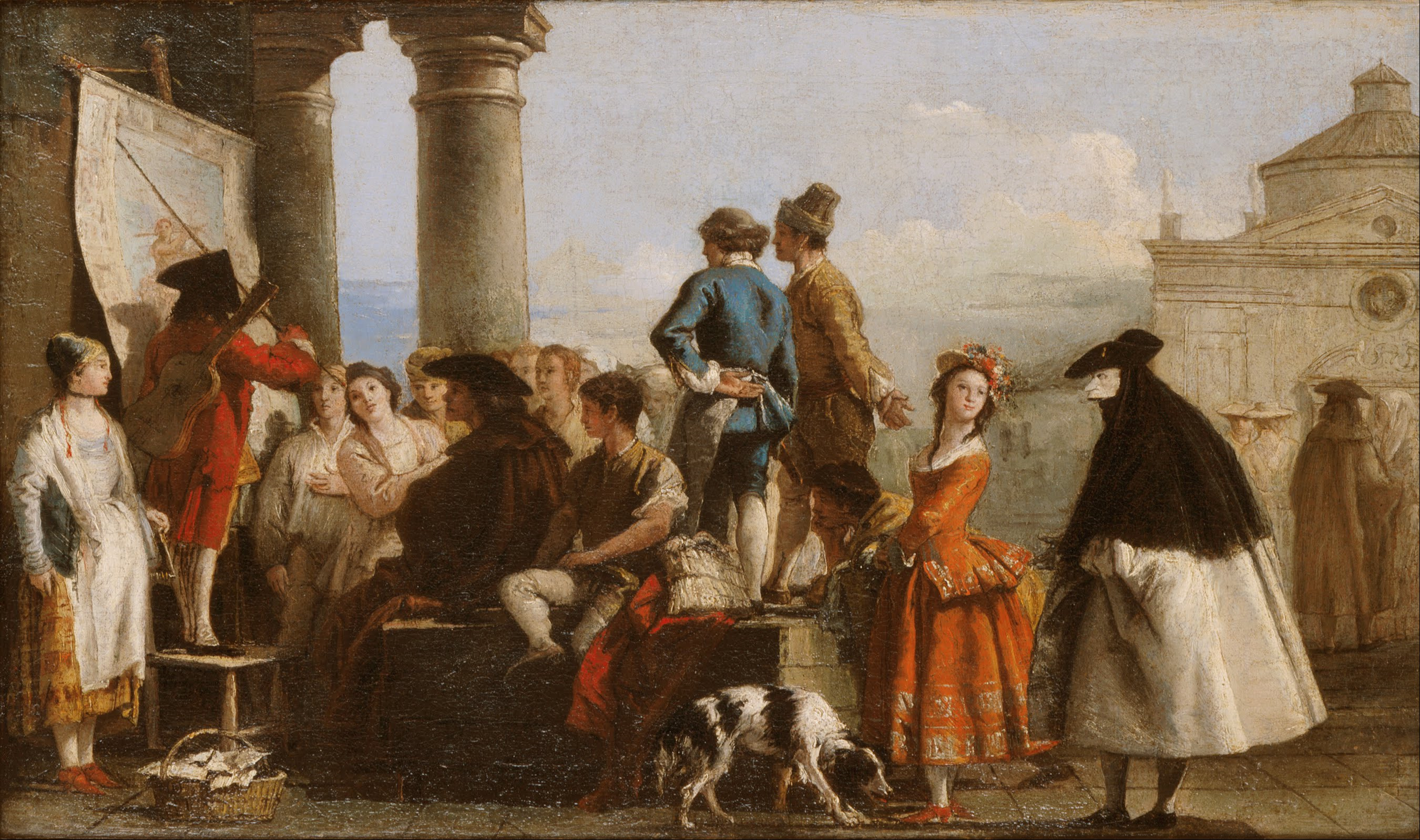
The Storyteller (mid-1770s) by Tiepolo
