= Pietro Toesca =

Italian art historian

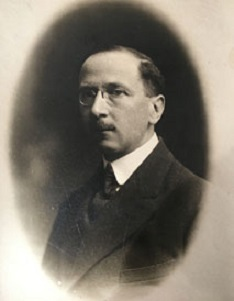
Toesca in the 1920s

Giovanni Pietro Toesca (12 July 1877 - 9 March 1962) was an Italian academic and art historian, notable as one of the most important historians of medieval to 20th century art. His La pittura e la miniatura nella Lombardia fino alla metà del Quattrocento was the first attempt to reconstruct the course of figurative Lombard art from the Middle Ages onwards, defining its importance across Europe.

== Life ==
Born in Pietra Ligure, he studied in Rome under Adolfo Venturi and began his own career as a teacher at Milan's Accademia scientifico-letteraria in 1905. Two years later he was chosen for the newly established chair in art history at the University of Turin. He moved to Florence in 1914, where he established a strong friendship with Bernard Berenson, and then Rome in 1926, remaining in the latter city until the end of his teaching career in 1948 and also dying there in 1962. His most important students included Roberto Longhi, Ernst Kitzinger, Carlo Bertelli, Giovanni Carandente and Federico Zeri.

In 1939 he joined the technical council of Italy's Istituto Centrale per il Restauro, now the Istituto superiore per la conservazione ed il restauro. He was also director of the medieval and modern art sections of the 1929-1937 Enciclopedia Italiana and national member of the Accademia dei Lincei from 1946 onwards. He married the art historian and essayist Elena Berti (1900-1967) and they had one child, Ilaria Toesca, who followed her parents into art history.

== Works ==
- La pittura e la miniatura nella Lombardia fino alla metà del Quattrocento (1912)
- Storia dell'arte italiana, I, Il Medioevo (1913–27)
- Monumenti e studi per la storia della miniatura italiana, I (1929)
- La pittura fiorentina del Trecento (1929)
- Storia dell'arte italiana, II, Il trecento (1951)

== Bibliography ==
- (in Italian) Giulio Carlo Argan, "La creazione dell'Istituto Centrale del restauro", interview edited by Mario Serio, Roma, 1989
- (in Italian) Roberto Longhi, “Pietro Toesca”, in AA.VV., Letteratura italiana. I critici, vol. V, Milano, Marzorati, 1987, pp. 3347–3351.
- "'Toesca, Pietro' on arthistorians.info".
- (in Italian) "'Toesca, Pietro' on Trecanni.it".
- (in Italian) Stefano Baldi - Viola Agata Lanza, Le fotografie Toesca all'Università di Torino, "Culture del testo e del Documento", a. 11, n. 33, settembre-dicembre 2010, pp. 31–50.
