= Roberto Longhi =

Italian art historian (1890–1970)

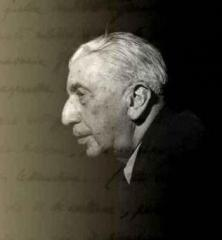
- Longhi in around 1960
- Born: 28 December 1890; Alba, Piedmont, Kingdom of Italy
- Died: 3 June 1970 (aged 79); Florence, Italy
- Education: University of Turin
- Known for: Scholarship on Caravaggio and Piero della Francesca
- Spouse: Lucia Lopresti
- Scientific career
- Fields: Art history
- Patrons: Count Alessandro Contini Bonacossi (1878–1955)
- Thesis: (1911)
- Doctoral advisor: Pietro Toesca
- Notable students: Evelina Borea, Giovanni Previtali, Luciano Bellosi
- Website: Fondazione di Studi di Storia dell'Arte Roberto Longhi

Roberto Longhi (28 December 1890 – 3 June 1970) was an Italian academic, art historian, and curator. The main subjects of his studies were the painters Caravaggio and Piero della Francesca.

== Early life and career ==
Longhi was born in December 1890 in Alba, Piedmont to parents from Emilia. He studied with Pietro Toesca in Turin and Adolfo Venturi in Rome. The latter made him book reviews editor of the journal L'Arte in 1914. Between 1912 and 1917, Longhi, primarily an essayist, published texts in L'Arte and La Voce on Mattia Preti, Piero della Francesca, Orazio Borgianni and Orazio Gentileschi. His writings in L'Arte were academic whereas his writings in La Voce were very radical.

Over the course of his career, Longhi developed a fascination with Caravaggio and his followers. his book Quesiti caravaggeschi [Questions on Caravaggio] (1928–34), was followed by Ultimi studi caravaggeschi [Latest Caravaggio studies] (1943). In 1951, Longhi curated a ground-breaking exhibition on Caravaggio at the Royal Palace in Milan, Mostra di Caravaggio e dei Caravaggeschi. In 1968 he authored a monograph on the artist.

Whilst establishing himself as a notable Caravaggio scholar, Longhi retained a lively interest in Piero della Francesca, editing a monograph in 1928, representing him as the leading painter of the Quattrocento. Longhi believed Piero della Francesca played a decisive role in the development of Venetian painting. This monograph, which Kenneth Clark opined could hardly be improved upon, established itself as a classic of art-historical literature.

Between 1920 and 1922, Longhi made a Grand Tour of Europe. He never visited Russia, nor some American collections, like the Kress Collection of the National Gallery, Washington. However, his first-hand viewing of many works, like those in the Borghese Gallery in Rome, led to the rediscovery of many lost masterpieces, such as two panels of a Giotto altarpiece.

Longhi also rekindled interest in a large number of followers of Caravaggio, such as Hendrick ter Brugghen (he edited a monograph in 1927) and some painters from Ferrara. His book Officina Ferrarese (1934) still stands as an exemplary study. Along with the publication of the Officina, Longhi started his academic career, first as Professor at Bologna University (from 1935), and later in Florence.

== Role in Nazi art looting ==
During the Second World War, Longhi advised Eugenio Ventura, a dealer in Florence, who was investigated for his involvement in an exchange of pictures confiscated by the Nazi looting organisation known as the ERR or Reichsleiter Rosenberg Taskforce. He also advised Count Alessandro Contini-Bonacossi (1878–1955) until 1945.

== Postwar ==
In 1950, Longhi co-founded and edited with his wife Lucia Lopresti (who wrote under the name Anna Banti) Paragone, a bi-monthly magazine on art and literature still running to this day.

Longhi also curated a number of exhibitions, including Mostra della pittura bolognese del Trecento (Pinacoteca Nazionale, Bologna, 1948); I pittori della realtà in Lombardia (Royal Palace, Milan, 1953); and Arte lombarda dai Visconti agli Sforza (Royal Palace, Milan, 1958).

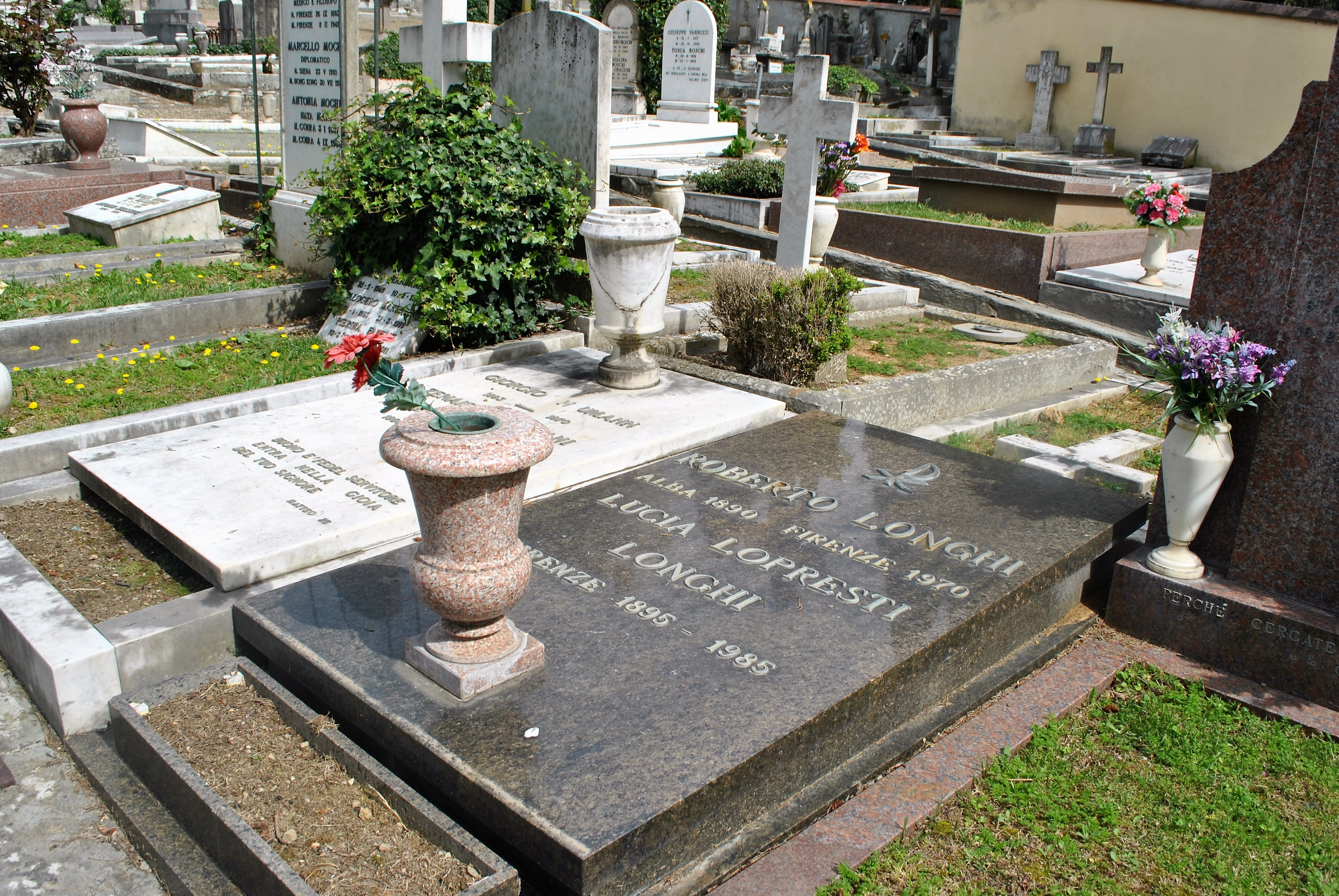
Cimitero degli Allori, Roberto Longhi

Longhi died on 3 June 1970 and is buried at Cimitero degli Allori in Florence.

Longhi created the Fondazione di Studi di Storia dell’Arte Roberto Longhi (also known as Fondazione Roberto Longhi) upon his death. He left the foundation his art collection, books and photographs. The foundation promotes the development of studies in art history by awarding grants to scholars to study in Florence. When his wife Lucia Lopresti died, she left their home, Villa Il Tasso (also known as Villa Il Ficalbo), to the foundation.

== Honours ==
- Knight Grand Cross of the Order of Merit of the Italian Republic (30 December 1969)
- Grand Officer of the Order of Merit of the Italian Republic (2 June 1961)

== Bibliography ==
- Longhi, Roberto (1927). Piero della Francesca. Rome: Valori Plastici.
- Longhi, Roberto (1934). Officina ferrarese. Edizioni d'Italia.
- Longhi, Roberto (1946). Viatico per cinque secoli di pittura veneziana. Florence: Sansoni.
- Longhi, Roberto (1951). Mostra del Caravaggio e dei caravaggeschi Catalogo. Florence: Sansoni.
- Longhi, Roberto (1956–1991). Edizione delle opere complete di Roberto Longhi. 14 vols. Florence: Sansoni.
- Longhi, Roberto; Ghidiglia Quintavalle, Augusta (1964). Correggio: the Frescoes in San Giovanni Evangelista in Parma. New York: H. N. Abrams.
- Longhi, Roberto (1968). Me pinxit e quesiti caravaggeschi, 1928-1934. Florence: Sansoni. OL 18650068M.
