= List of presidents of St John's College, Oxford =

A list of presidents of St John's College, Oxford:

- Rev. Alexander Belsyre (1557–1559)
- Rev. William Eley (1559–1560)
- Rev. William Stock (1560–1564)
- Rev. John Robinson (1564–1572)
- Rev. Tobias Matthew (1572–1577)
- Rev. Francis Willis (1577–1590)
- Rev. Ralph Hutchinson (1590–1606)
- Rev. John Buckeridge, 1606–1611
- Rev. William Laud, 1611–1621
- Rev. William Juxon, 1621–1633
- Rev. Richard Baylie, 1633–1648
- Rev. Francis Cheynell, 1648–1650
- Rev. Thankful Owen, 1650–1660
- Rev. Richard Baylie, 1660–1667
- Rev. Peter Mews, 1667–1673
- Rev. William Levinz, 1673–1698
- Rev. William Delaune, 1698–1728
- Rev. William Holmes, 1728–1748
- Rev. William Derham, 1748–1757
- Rev. William Walker, 1757
- Rev. Thomas Fry, 1757–1772
- Rev. Samuel Dennis, 1772–1795
- Rev. Michael Marlow, 1795–1828
- Rev. Philip Wynter, 1828–1871
- Rev. James Bellamy, 1871–1909
- Rev. Herbert Armitage James, 1909–1931
- Rev. Frederick William Hall, 1931–1933
- Sir Cyril Norwood, 1933–1946
- Austin Lane Poole, 1947–1957
- William Costin, 1957–1963
- John David Mabbott, 1963–1969
- Sir Richard W. Southern, 1969–1981
- Sir John Kendrew, 1981–1987
- William Hayes, 1987–2001
- Sir Michael Scholar, 2001–July 2012
- Margaret Snowling, September 2012–2022
- Dame Sue Black, Baroness Black of Strome, September 2022–

== See also ==
- St John's College, Oxford
- Oxford University
