= Marlow (surname) =

Marlow is a surname of English origin, derived from the town of Marlow in Buckinghamshire.

== People with the surname ==
=== Athletes ===
- Bobby Marlow (c. 1930–1985), American football running back
- Charles Marlow (jockey) (1814–1882), English jockey
- Donny Marlow, ring name of Tanga Loa, Tongan-American wrestler
- Francis Marlow (1867–1952), English cricketer
- Fred Marlow (1928–2013), English (soccer) footballer
- Geoff Marlow (1914–1978), English (soccer) footballer
- Ian Marlow (born 1963), English rugby union and rugby league footballer
- Janet Marlow (born 1958), British middle-distance runner
- Joseph Marlow (1854–1923), English cricketer
- Peter Marlow (athlete) (born 1941), British racewalker
- Thomas Marlow (1878–1954), English cricketer
- William Marlow (cricketer) (1900–1975), played for Leicestershire

=== Arts & letters (actors, impresarios, musicians, producers, writers, journalists, publishers, photographers, painters, etc) ===
- Alex Marlow (born 1986), editor of Breitbart News
- Ellen Marlow (born 1994), American actress
- George Marlow born Joseph Marks (1876–1939) Australian theatre entrepreneur
- Jess Marlow (1929–2014), American journalist
- Jesse Marlow (born 1978), Australian photographer
- Ken Marlow (born 1960), American realist painter
- Louis Marlow, pen-name of Louis Wilkinson (1881–1966), British novelist.
- Lucy Drake Marlow (née Drake 1890–1978), American artist
- Max Marlow, pseudonym of British writing team Christopher Nicole and Diana Bachmann
- Mitch Marlow, sometime guitarist with He Is Legend
- Peter Marlow (photographer) (1952–2016), British news photographer
- Ric Marlow (born Sanford Phillip Schafler 1925–2017), American songwriter and actor
- Richard Marlow (1939–2013), English choral conductor and organist
- Robert Marlow (1961–2022), UK musician also performing as "Marlow"
- Tim Marlow (born 1962), British writer, broadcaster and art historian
- Toby Marlow (born 1994), English writer, composer and actor
- William Marlow (1740–1813), English landscape and marine painter and etcher

=== Other ===
- Frank Marlow (1869–1935), Australian rules football administrator
- John Marlow (1829–1903), police officer in Queensland, Australia
- Michael Marlow (priest) (died 1828), Anglican priest and Oxford University administrator
- Michael Marlow (economist), professor at California Polytechnic
- Simon Marlow, British computer programmer

=== Further disambiguations ===
- Peter Marlow (disambiguation)
- Max Marlow (disambiguation)

== Given name ==
- Marlow Moss (1889–1958), British Constructivist artist

== Fictional characters ==
- Marlow series of books by Antonia Forest
- Charles Marlow, a character created by Joseph Conrad
- Philip Marlow, protagonist of The Singing Detective TV miniseries

== See also ==
- Marlow (disambiguation)
- Marlowe (name)
