= Christopher Nicole bibliography =

This is a list of books by Christopher Nicole. Some of his books have been reedited under different titles or pseudonyms.

== As Christopher Nicole ==
Works published under the name Christopher Nicole.

=== Non-fiction ===
- West Indian Cricket: the Story of Cricket in the West Indies (1957)
- The West Indies: Their People and History (1965)
- Introduction to Chess (1973)

=== Novels ===
==== Single novels ====
- Off White (1959)
- Shadows in the Jungle (1961)
- Ratoon (1962)
- Dark Noon (1963)
- White Boy (1966)
- The Self Lovers (1968)
- Thunder and the Shouting (1969)
- Where the Cavern Ends (1970)
- The Longest Pleasure (1970)
- The Face of Evil (1971)
- Lord of the Golden Fan (1973)
- Heroes (1973)
- The Secret Memoirs of Lord Byron (1979) (a.k.a. Lord of Sin)
- The Ship with No Name (1987)
- China (1999)
- Ransom Island (2001)
- Demon (2003)
- The Falls of Death (2004)
- Cold Country, Hot Sun (2005)
- Deep Gold (2014)
- The Lion Queen (2014)
- Seas of Passion (2015)
- Queen of Destiny (2016)

==== Series ====
===== Amyot Saga =====
1. Amyot's Cay (1964)
2. Blood Amyot (1964)
3. The Amyot Crime (1965)

===== Caribee of the Hiltons Saga =====
1. Caribee (1974)
2. The Devil's Own (1975)
3. Mistress of Darkness (1976)
4. Black Dawn (1977)
5. Sunset (1978)

===== The Haggard Chronicles Saga =====
1. Haggard (1980)
2. Haggard's Inheritance (1981) (a.k.a. The Inheritors)
3. Young Haggards (1982)

===== China =====
1. The Crimson Pagoda (1983)
2. The Scarlet Princess (1984)
3. Red Dawn (1985)

===== The Sun of Japan =====
1. The Sun Rises (1984)
2. The Sun and the Dragon (1985)
3. The Sun on Fire (1987)

===== Black Majesty Saga =====
1. The Seeds of Rebellion (1984)
2. Wild Harvest (1985)

===== McGann Saga =====
1. Old Glory (1986)
2. The Sea and the Sand (1986)
3. Iron Ships, Iron Men (1987)
4. Wind of Destiny (1987)
5. Raging Sea, Searing Sky (1990)
6. The Passion and the Glory (1988)

===== Kenya =====
1. The High Country (1988)
2. The Happy Valley (1989)

===== Murdoch Mackinder Saga =====
1. The Regiment (1988)
2. The Command (1989)
3. The Triumph (1989)

===== Pearl of the Orient =====
1. Pearl of the Orient (1988)
2. Dragon's Blood (1989)
3. Singapura (1990)
4. Dark Sun (1990)

===== Sword of India =====
1. Sword of Fortune (1990)
2. Sword of Empire (1991)

===== Dawson Saga =====
1. Days of Wine and Roses? (1991)
2. The Titans (1992)
3. Resumption (1992)
4. The Last Battle (1993)

===== Bloody Sun =====
1. Bloody Sunrise (1993)
2. Bloody Sunset (1994)

===== Russian Saga =====
1. The Seeds of Power (1994)
2. The Masters (1995)
3. The Red Tide (1995)
4. The Red Gods (1996)
5. The Scarlet Generation (1996)
6. Death of a Tyrant (1997)

===== Arms Trade =====
1. The Trade (1997)
2. Shadows in the Sun (1998)
3. Guns in the Desert (1998)
4. Prelude to War (1999)

===== Berkeley Townsend =====
1. To All Eternity (1999)
2. The Quest (2000)
3. Be Not Afraid (2000)

===== Jessica Jones Saga =====
1. The Search (2001)
2. Poor Darling (2002)
3. The Pursuit (2002)
4. The Voyage (2003)
5. The Followers (2004)
6. A Fearful Thing (2005)

===== Anna Fehrbach Saga =====
1. Angel from Hell (2006)
2. Angel in Red (2006)
3. Angel of Vengeance (2007)
4. Angel in Jeopardy (2007)
5. Angel of Doom (2008)
6. Angel Rising (2008)
7. Angel of Destruction (2009)
8. Angel of Darkness (2009)
9. Angel in Peril (2013)

===== Jane Elizabeth Digby Saga =====
1. Dawn of a Legend (2010)
2. Twilight of a Goddess (2010)

===== Queen of Jhansi =====
Novels featuring the Queen of Jhansi.

1. Manu (2011)
2. Queen of Glory (2012) (a.k.a. Indian Mutiny)

== As Peter Grange ==
=== Single novels ===
- King Creole (1966)
- The Devil's Emissary (1968)
- The Tumult at the Gate (1970)
- The Golden Goddess (1973)

== As Andrew York ==
Works published under the name Andrew York.

=== Single novels ===
- Dark Passage (1976)
- The Combination (1983)

=== Jonas Wilde: Eliminator Saga ===
1. The Eliminator (1966)
2. The Co-ordinator (1968)
3. The Predator (1968)
4. The Deviator (1969)
5. The Dominator (1969)
6. The Infiltrator (1971)
7. The Expurgator (1972)
8. The Captivator (1973)
9. The Fascinator (1975)

=== Operations by Jonathan Anders Saga ===
1. The Doom Fisherman (1969) (a.k.a. Operation Destruct as Christopher Nicole)
2. Manhunt for a General (1970) (a.k.a. Operation Manhunt as Christopher Nicole)
3. Appointment in Kiltone (1972) (a.k.a. Operation Neptune as Christopher Nicole)

=== Tallant for Saga ===
1. Tallant for Trouble (1977)
2. Tallant for Disaster (1978)
3. Tallant for Terror (1995)
4. Tallant for Democracy (1996)

== As Robin Cade ==
=== Single novels ===
- The Fear Dealers (1974)

== As Mark Logan ==
=== Nicholas Minnett Saga ===
1. Tricolour (1976) (a.k.a. The Captain's Woman)
2. Guillotine (1976) (a.k.a. French Kiss)
3. Brumaire (1978) (a.k.a. December Passions)

== As Christina Nicholson ==
Works published under the name Christina Nicholson.

=== Single novels ===
- Power and the Passion (1977)
- The Savage Sands (1978)
- Queen of Paris (1979)

== As Alison York ==
Works published under the name Alison York.

=== Single novels ===
- The Fire and the Rope (1979)
- The Scented Sword (1980)
- No Sad Song (1987)
- A Secret Truth (1987)
- That Dear Perfection (1988)
- The Maxton Bequest (1989)
- A Binding Contract (1990)
- Summer in Eden (1990)
- Love's Double Fool (1991)
- Distant Shadows (1992)
- Tomorrow's Harvest (1992)
- Dear Enemy (1994)
- Free to Love (1995)

== As Leslie Arlen ==
Works published under the name Leslie Arlen.

=== The Borodins Saga ===
1. Love and Honor (1980)
2. War and Passion (1981)
3. Fate and Dreams (1981)
4. Hope and Glory (1982)
5. Rage and Desire (1982)
6. Fortune and Fury (1984)

== As Robin Nicholson or C.R. Nicholson ==
=== Single novels ===
- A Passion for Treason (1981) (a.k.a. The Friday Spy)

== As Daniel Adams ==
=== Grant Saga ===
1. Brothers and Enemies (1982)
2. Defiant Loves (1984)

== As Simon McKay ==
=== Anderson Line Series ===
1. The Seas of Fortune (1983)
2. The Rivals (1985)

== As Caroline Gray ==
Works published under the name Caroline Gray.

=== Single novels ===
- First Class (1984)
- Hotel de Luxe (1985)
- Victoria's Walk (1986)
- White Rani (1986)
- The Third Life (1988)
- The Shadow of Death (1989)
- Blue Water, Black Depths (1990)
- The Daughter (1992)
- Golden Girl (1992)
- Spares (1993)
- Crossbow (1996)
- Masquerade (1997)

=== Helier L'Eree Trilogy ===
1. Spawn of the Devil (1994)
2. Sword of the Devil (1994)
3. Death of the Devil (1994)

=== Mayne Saga ===
1. A Woman of Her Time (1995)
2. A Child of Fortune (1996)

=== Colonial Caribee Saga ===
1. The Promised Land (1997)
2. The Phoenix (1998)
3. The Torrent (1999)
4. The Inheritance (1999)

== As Alan Savage ==
Works published under the name Alan Savage.

=== Single novels ===
- Ottoman (1990)
- Moghul (1991)
- Queen of the Night (1993)
- Queen of Lions (1994)

=== Eight Banners ===
1. The Eight Banners (1992)
2. The Last Bannerman (1993)

=== Eleanor of Aquitaine Saga ===
1. Eleanor of Aquitaine (1995)
2. Queen of Love (1995)

=== The Sword Series ===
1. The Sword and the Scalpel (1996)
2. The Sword and the Jungle (1996)
3. The Sword and the Prison (1997)
4. Stop Rommel! (1998)
5. The Afrika Corps (1998)
6. The Traitor Within (1999)

=== Commando Series ===
1. Commando (1999)
2. The Cause (2000)
3. The Tiger (2000)

=== Balkan Saga ===
1. Partisan (2001)
2. Murder's Art (2002)
3. Battleground (2002)
4. The Killing Ground (2003)

=== French Resistance Saga ===
1. Resistance (2003)
2. The Game of Treachery (2004)
3. Legacy of Hate (2004)
4. The Brightest Day (2005)

=== RAF Saga ===
1. Blue Yonder (2005)
2. Death in the Sky (2006)
3. Spiralling Down (2007)
4. The Whirlwind (2007)

=== A Honourable Duncan Morant Naval Thriller Saga ===
1. Storm Warning (2007)
2. The Flowing Tide (2008)
3. The Calm and the Storm (2008)
4. The Vortex (2009)

== As Nicholas Grant ==
=== Single novels ===
- Khan (1993)
- Siblings (1995)

== As Max Marlow ==
Max Marlow was the pseudonym formed by Christopher Nicole and Diana Bachmann.

=== Single novels ===
- Her Name Will Be Faith (1988)
- The Red Death (1990)
- Meltdown (1991)
- Arctic Peril (1993)
- Growth (1993)
- Where the River Rises (1994)
- Shadow at Evening (1994)
- The Burning Rocks (1995)
- Hell's Children (1996)
- Dry (1997)
- The Trench (1998)
