= Max Marlow (disambiguation) =

Max Marlow may refer to:

- Max Marlow, pseudonym of British writing team Christopher Nicole and Diana Bachmann
- Max Marlow (filmmaker) (born 1995), British filmmaker, writer and producer
- Max Marlow (musician), British musician

== See also ==
- Max (given name)
- Marlow (surname)
