= Marlowe =

Marlowe may refer to:

== Name ==
- Marlowe (name), including list of people and characters with the surname or given name
- Christopher Marlowe (1564–1593), English dramatist, poet and translator
- Pat Marlowe (1933–1962), English socialite
- Philip Marlowe, fictional hardboiled detective created by author Raymond Chandler
- Cade Marlowe (born 1997), American baseball player

== Places ==
- Marlowe Theatre, in Canterbury, England, UK
- Marlowe, West Virginia, an unincorporated community in the United States
  - Marlowe Consolidated School, listed on the U.S. National Register of Historic Places
- Marlowes, a major street in the town of Hemel Hempstead in Hertfordshire, England, UK
- Marlowe, New South Wales, a locality in Australia

== Performing arts ==
- Marlowe (musical), loosely based on the life of Christopher Marlowe
- Marlowe (1969 film), a drama based on a story by Raymond Chandler
- Marlowe (2022 film), an American neo-noir thriller film
- Marlowe Brothers, stage name of pianists Jeffrey and Ronald Marlowe
- Where's Marlowe?, 1998 comedy/mystery film
- Philip Marlowe, Private Eye, television mystery series airing from 1983 to 1986
- Marlowe (rap duo), rap duo composed of L'Orange and Solemn Brigham

== See also ==
- Marlow (disambiguation)
