= Baptist Levinz =

Anglican bishop of Sodor and Man 1684 to 1692

The Right Reverend Baptist Levinz DD
- Bishop of Sodor and Man
- Diocese: Diocese of Sodor and Man
- In office: 1685–1693 (death)
- Predecessor: John Lake
- Successor: Thomas Wilson

Orders
- Consecration: 15 March 1685 by William Sancroft

Personal details
- Born: 1644
- Died: 31 January 1693 (aged 48–49)
- Denomination: Anglican
- Spouse: Mary Levinz (1680-1693)
- Education: Magdalen Hall, Oxford

Baptist Levinz, sometimes Baptiste or Baptist Levinge, (1644 - 31 January 1693) was an Anglican churchman. He is known as a bishop and also for the part he played in the dramatic election at Magdalen College, Oxford.

== Life ==
He was born at Evenley, Northamptonshire, the youngest son of William Levinz, brother of the judge Creswell Levinz and academic William Levinz, and nephew of the Royalist Robert Levinz. He matriculated at Magdalen Hall, Oxford on 11 April 1660, and was elected demy of Magdalen College on 29 July 1663, and probationer fellow on 1 August 1664. He graduated Bachelor of Arts (BA) in 1663, Oxford Master of Arts (MA Oxon) in 1666, Bachelor of Divinity (BD) in 1677, and Doctor of Divinity (DD) in 1683.

In his academic career, he became junior dean in 1675, senior dean of arts in 1676, senior proctor on 5 April 1678, bursar in 1677, founder's chaplain in 1678, and dean of divinity in 1679. He was Whyte's professor of moral philosophy in the university from 27 March 1677 until 1682. As a churchman, he was made prebendary of Wells on 8 December 1675, curate of Horspath, Oxfordshire in 1680, and rector of Christian Malford, Wiltshire in 1682. He was nominated Bishop of Sodor and Man by William Stanley, 9th Earl of Derby on 28 October 1684 and consecrated on 15 March 1685.

In 1687 he was a likely candidate for election as president of Magdalen College, instead of John Hough, at a time when James II was exerting influence on the college's choice. On the advice probably of his brother Creswell Levinz, he withdrew his candidature before the election; the manner of his action was criticised as not honourable. In the account of John Rouse Bloxam, the Vice-President and Fellows of Magdalen wrote on 31 March to Peter Mews, as Bishop of Winchester the college's Visitor; he replied the next day commending Levinz, and advising the fellowship to stick closely to the statutes. Levinz initially accepted and said he would resist the mandamus of 5 April, by which James sought to impose his candidate Anthony Farmer. But Levinz then withdrew, and later in April the college elected Hough.

On 3 August 1691 he was chosen prebendary of Winchester. He died of fever at Winchester on 31 January 1693, and was buried in Winchester Cathedral. By his marriage, on 3 July 1680, to Mary (1663–1730), daughter of James Hyde, principal of Magdalen Hall, he was father of a son and daughter.

== Sources ==
This article incorporates text from a publication now in the public domain: "Levinz, Baptist". Dictionary of National Biography. London: Smith, Elder & Co. 1885–1900.

Church of England titles
Preceded by John Lake	Bishop of Sodor and Man; 1684–1693	Succeeded by Thomas Wilson
