= Mabbott =

Mabbott is a surname. Notable people with the surname include:

- Barrie Mabbott (born 1960), New Zealand rower
- Joe Mabbott, American record producer and audio engineer
- Michael Mabbott, Canadian film and television director and writer
- Thomas Ollive Mabbott (1898–1968), American academic
- John David Mabbott (1898–1988), British academic

== See also ==
- Mabbutt
