= Marlow =

Marlow may refer to:

== Places ==
=== Australia ===
- Marlow, New South Wales, a suburb on the Central Coast

=== Germany ===
- Marlow, Germany

=== United Kingdom ===
- Little Marlow, Buckinghamshire
- Marlow, Buckinghamshire
  - Marlow Bridge, an old suspension bridge over the River Thames
  - Marlow RUFC, a rugby union club in Buckinghamshire
  - Marlow F.C., a football club in Buckinghamshire
  - Marlow United F.C., a football club in Buckinghamshire
  - Marlow Regatta, an international rowing event
  - Marlow Town Regatta and Festival, a local rowing event and festival
- Marlow, Herefordshire

=== United States ===
- Marlow, Missouri
- Marlow, New Hampshire
- Marlow, Oklahoma
- Marlow, Tennessee
- Marlow Heights, Maryland

== Other uses ==
- Marlow (surname), including list of persons and fictional characters with the name
- Marlow Industries, an American electronics manufacturer
- Marlow (TV series)

== See also ==
- Marlowe (disambiguation)
- The Marlow Murder Club, a 2024 British mystery television series
