= William Salkeld =

William Salkeld may refer to:

- William Salkeld (legal writer) (1671–1715), English legal writer
- William Salkeld (politician) (1842–1901), member of the Queensland Legislative Assembly
- Bill Salkeld (1917–1967), American baseball player
