= William Eley =

William Eley is the name of:

- William Eley (academic), English priest and academic
- William Eley (basketball) (born 1975), American former basketball player known as "Bud"
- William Eley (footballer), English footballer
