= John Owen (bishop of St Davids) =

Welsh bishop and professor

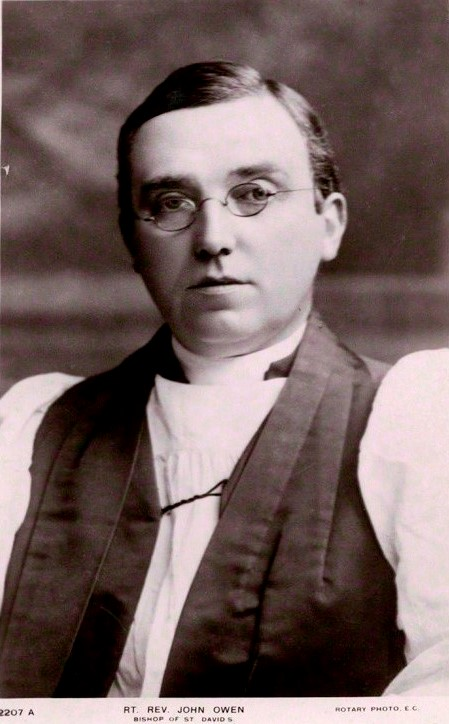
John Owen, Bishop of St David's

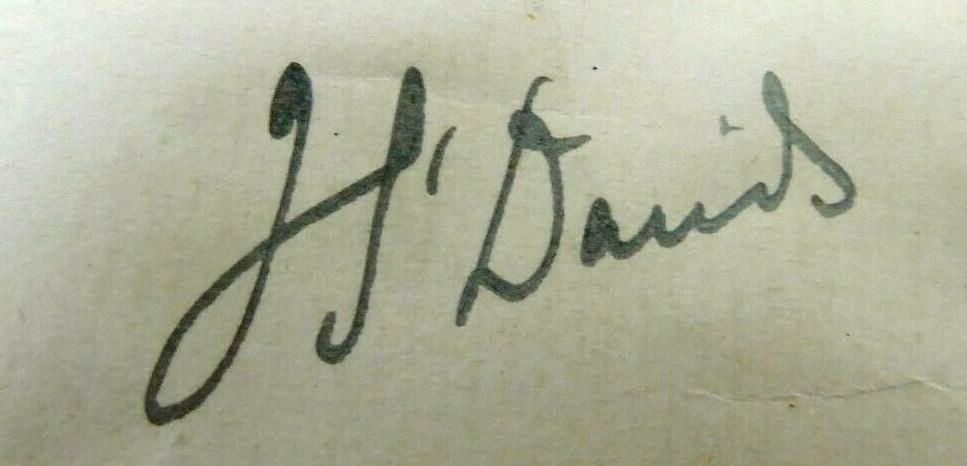
John Owen – signature

John Owen (24 August 1854 – 4 November 1926) was professor of Welsh at St David's College and Dean of St Asaph. He became the Bishop of St David's in 1897.

Born at Ysgubor Wen, Caernarfonshire (Gwynedd), his father Griffith Owen was a Welsh Calvinistic Methodist. Though he never deviated from his own loyalties, he watched his son's career as an Anglican with great pride. Owen's mother, Ann Jones from Aberdaron, could not easily reconcile herself to her son becoming an Anglican, however, nor could she wholly accept the fact that he married an English wife.

In 1872, Owen was awarded a mathematical scholarship at Jesus College, Oxford, where he read classics and mathematics. He graduated B.A. in 1876 (promoted to M.A. in 1879).

As a graduate, he began a teaching career at Botwnnog grammar school. Whilst at Botwnnog, Owen discovered an interest in the Anglicanism and was gradually drawn towards ordination, though he decided to teach for a few years until he was sure of his vocation.

As a respected educator, Owen was appointed Professor of Welsh at St David's College, Lampeter (now the University of Wales Trinity Saint David), in 1879 and committed himself in two respects: he would advance the study of the Welsh language at the college and would aim to be ordained before, or soon after, joining the college. In both respects he was successful and was ordained deacon in 1879 and priest in 1880.

In 1889, A. G. Edwards, newly appointed Bishop of St Asaph, invited Owen to join him as dean. At St Asaph, Owen maintained an interest in education and his colleagues nominated him to serve on the charter committee of the nascent University of Wales, established in 1891, which gave him a new emphasis to his existing interest in higher education.

In 1892, Owen returned to Lampeter as principal, an office he was to hold until he became Bishop of Saint David's in 1897. His time as principal was not an easy one: he fought a sustained battle for Lampeter to be included in the newly formed federal University of Wales, which had already embraced the colleges at Aberystwyth, Bangor and Cardiff universities. Lampeter already conferred its own degrees under Royal Charter and, for Owen, it was unthinkable that it should be excluded from this new university. Those against Lampeter's admission, however, argued that the original plan for Lampeter had been to found a theological college and, as such, it should be excluded like any other denominational college in the nation. Owen was furious, regarding Lampeter as a university institution and theological college. He petitioned the privy council, sparking a debate in the House of Lords. Lampeter's case was upheld, but the Prime Minister, William Ewart Gladstone, refused to be moved and the University of Wales received its royal charter with Lampeter firmly excluded. Too late to effect this outcome, Owen established a supplemental charter for the college, re-affirming in the plainest terms that the college existed to "receive and educate any person whatsoever, whether destined for Holy Orders or not". Lampeter was not to be admitted to the university until 1971.

In January 1897, Basil Jones, Bishop of St David's, died and, within six weeks, Owen had been named as his successor. Much of Owen's episcopate was marked by controversy and he was not afraid of confrontation, even so he led the Church in Wales through the difficult disestablishment and become regarded as spokesman for the Welsh church during this time. In private correspondence there was even a suggestion that he should become Wales' first archbishop, but he refused to consider it. In Easter week 1920, he presided over the election of A. G. Edwards as the first Archbishop of Wales.

Owen died of a short illness on 4 November 1926 and was buried on 9 November at Abergwili, Carmarthenshire.

Owen is extremely well documented not least in the press, both denominational and national (in both senses) due to his combative nature and the controversial positions he took. The two volume Life by his daughter, Eluned Owen, is inevitably partial but most readily available.

== Sources ==
Eluned E. Owen, The Early Life of Bishop Owen, A Son of Lleyn, Gomerian Press, 1958

Eluned E. Owen, The Later Life of Bishop Owen, a Son of Wales, Gomerian Press, 1961

== Notes ==
Academic offices
Preceded by Charles Gresford Edmondes	Principal of St David's College; 1892–1897	Succeeded by George William Gent
Church of England titles
Preceded by Herbert Armitage James	Dean of St Asaph; 1889–1892	Succeeded by Watkin Williams
Preceded by William Basil Jones	Bishop of St Davids; 1897–1926	Succeeded by David Lewis Prosser
