= List of honorary fellows of St John's College, Oxford =

This is a list of Honorary Fellows of St John's College, Oxford. A list of current honorary fellows is published on the college's website at Honorary Fellows.

- Rushanara Ali
- Myles Allen
- Robert Anderson
- Sir Alan Bailey
- Alexander Bird
- Dorothy Bishop
- Sir Tony Blair
- Sarah-Jayne Blakemore
- Elleke Boehmer
- Ian Bostridge
- Anthony Boyce
- Peter Burke
- Sir Keith Burnett
- William Burns
- Sir David Cannadine
- John Carey
- Sir Nigel Carrington
- Sir Richard Catlow
- John Cottingham
- Robert Darnton
- John Darwin
- Brian Davies
- Evan Davis
- Sir Robert Devereux
- Sir Andrew Dilnot
- Dame Angela Eagle
- David Edgerton
- David Flood
- Willam Hayes
- Ioan James
