= Alexander Belsyre =

English priest and academic

Alexander Belsyre, D.D. was an English priest and academic in the mid 16th-century.

A Fellow of New College, Oxford, he was the first President of St John's College, Oxford, although he would be deprived of his office by the college's founder, Sir Thomas White, for financial dishonesty and perjury in c. 1559. He held Livings at Colerne, Osney and Hanborough. He died on 13 July 1567.
