= Creswell Levinz =

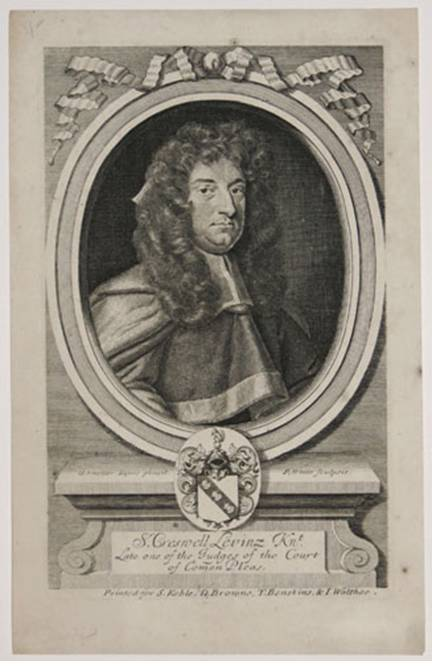
Sir Creswell Levinz by Robert White

Sir Creswell Levinz (1627–1701), judge, was the second son of William Levinz, the elder, of Evenley, Northamptonshire, by Mary, second daughter of Richard Creswell of Purston in the same county. He was the brother of Baptist Levinz and William Levinz, and nephew of the Royalist Robert Levinz.

== Early career ==
He took a sizarship in 1648 at Trinity College, Cambridge, but did not graduate, and in November 1655 entered Gray's Inn, where he was called to the bar in November 1661, was elected a bencher in 1678, and treasurer in 1679. He was knighted at Whitehall on 2 Oct. 1678, and made a King's Counsel about the same time. He represented the crown in the trials of Ireland, Pickering, Grove, Langhorn, Whitebread, and other supposed Popish Plotters in 1678–79. In October 1679 he was made Attorney-General. In December the celebrated proclamation against "tumultuous petitioning" was under discussion in the council, and Levinz was required to draft it. He refused at first, but eventually consented on condition that Chief-Justice North would dictate the substance of it. Levinz was thus able, when examined by the House of Commons of England as to his part in the affair (24 Nov. 1680), to shift the entire responsibility on to North's shoulders.

== Lord Russell's trial and removal from office ==
On 12 Feb. 1680 Levinz was called to the degree of Serjeant-at-Law and raised to the bench of the common pleas. He went the Oxford circuit, and was a member of the commission which tried Stephen College at the Oxford assizes in August 1681. He was also a member of the special commission which sat at the Old Bailey in July 1683 to try Lord Russell for his supposed participation in the Rye House Plot. Lord Russell having challenged one of the jury for not having a freehold estate within the city, the point was elaborately argued. All the judges, however, decided against the challenge. Levinz's judgment is reported at some length in Cobbett's State Trials. In 1684–85 Levinz was consulted by the king on the question whether a contract by the late king letting out part of the excise to farm was determined by his death, and gave the more sound than courtly advice that it was so. His "quietus" was expected to follow as a matter of course. It was deferred, however, for a time, and he was one of Jeffreys' colleagues in the Bloody Assizes, and also helped to try some of the rebels in London. His supersedeas came on 10 Feb. 1685–86. No ground of dismissal was assigned, but probably Levinz was thought to be unsafe on the question of the dispensing power.

== Late cases, death and legacy ==
He at once returned to the bar, and was soon busily engaged in pleading. He was one of the counsel for the Seven Bishops in 1688, defended Major John Bernardi (an alleged conspirator in the Jacobite Assassination Plot), securing the dismissal of the bill of indictment by the grand jury and, in the great habeas corpus case of Rex v. Kendall and Roe, before Lord Chief Justice Holt in 1695, he argued successfully against the legality of a committal to prison under a general warrant by a secretary of state. He died at Serjeants' Inn on 29 Jan. 1700–1, and was buried in Evenley parish church. Part of his monument there survives: a more than life-size marble statue of Levinz wearing his judge's robes and wig. He was succeeded by his son William who was a Nottinghamshire MP.

== Writings ==
From manuscripts left by Levinz was published in 1702 a folio volume of reports in French (with an English translation chiefly by Salkeld); it reappeared under the title, The Reports of Sir Creswell Levinz, Knight, London, 1722, 2 vols. fol. A third edition in English only, revised by Thomas Vickers, was published at Dublin in 1793–7, 3 vols. 8vo. Levinz also compiled A Collection of Select and Modern Entries of Declarations, Pleadings, Issues, Verdicts, Judgments, &c., referring to the Cases in Sir Creswell Levinz's Reports, the judgment of the Court being added to each President (sic), which was published in London in 1702, fol. There has been some division of opinion among English judges as to Levinz's merits as a reporter.
