= John Robinson (archdeacon of Bedford) =

John Robinson (died 1598) was an English priest and academic in the second half of the 16th century.

Robinson was born in Richmondshire and educated at Pembroke College, Cambridge. He was President of St John's College, Oxford, from 1564 to 1572. He held livings at East Treswell, Fulbeck, Thornton, (Note: The citations say Thornton, Yorkshire. There are several places called Thornton in Yorkshire, and it is unclear which this one was.) Great Easton, Brant Broughton, Fishtoft, Caistor, Kingston Bagpuze, Little Gransden (1587–97) and Somersham. Robinson became Precentor of Lincoln Cathedral in 1573; and Archdeacon of Bedford in 1574, holding both positions until his death in 1598.
