= William Juxon =

Archbishop of Canterbury from 1660 to 1663

The Most Reverend and Right Honourable William Juxon
- Archbishop of Canterbury
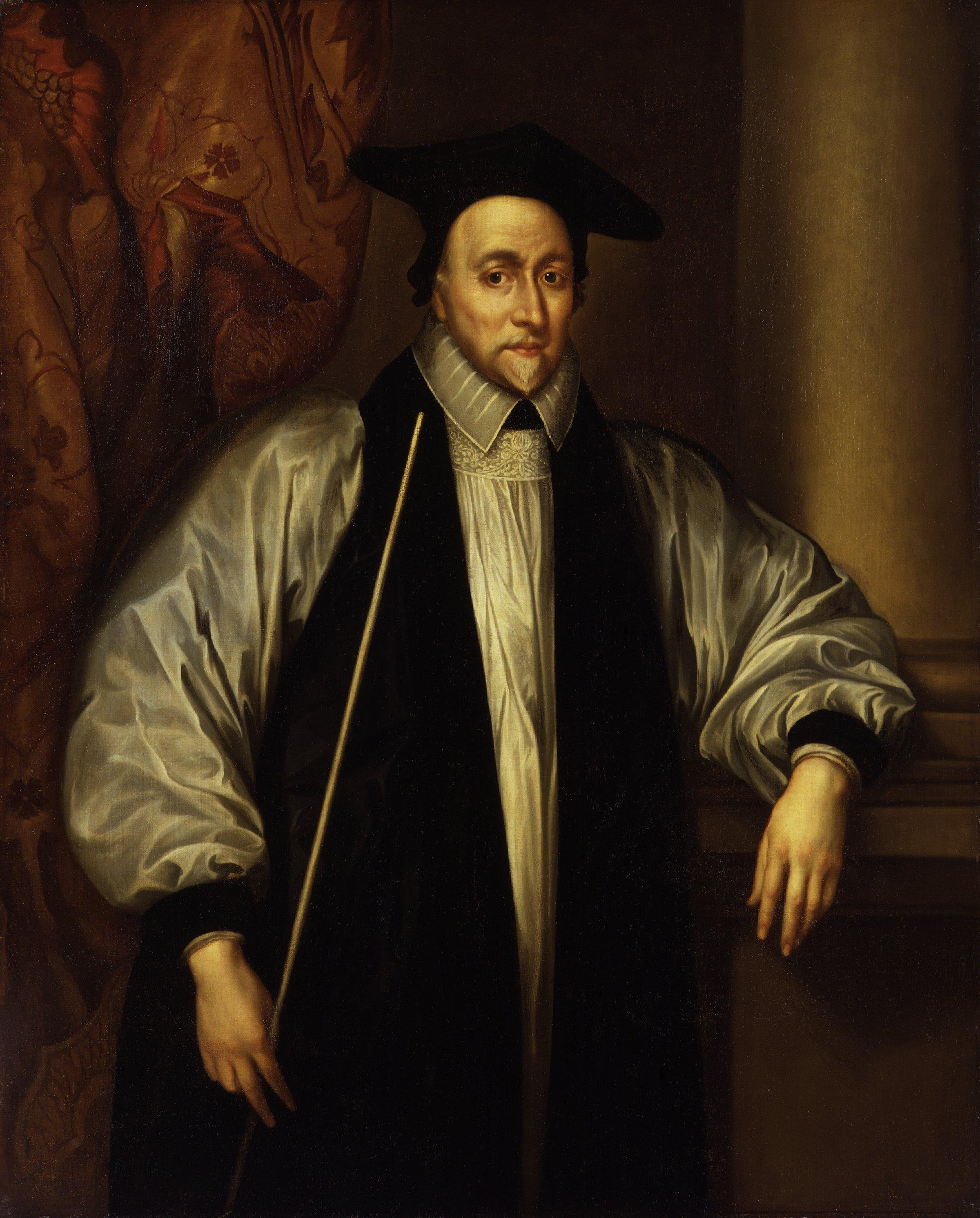
- Church: Church of England
- Province: Province of Canterbury
- Diocese: Diocese of Canterbury
- Elected: 13 September 1660 (elected); 20 September 1660 (election confirmed), Henry VII Chapel, Westminster Abbey
- Installed: 25 September 1660
- Term ended: 4 June 1663 (death)
- Predecessor: William Laud
- Successor: Gilbert Sheldon
- Other posts: President of St John's College, Oxford (1621–1633); Vice-Chancellor of the University of Oxford (1626–1628); Dean of Worcester (1628–1632); Clerk of the Closet (1632–1633); Bishop of Hereford (1633); Bishop of London (1633–1646 and 1660); Lord High Treasurer (1636–1641); First Lord of the Admiralty (1636–1638)

Personal details
- Born: 1582 Chichester, Sussex, England
- Died: 4 June 1663 (aged approximately 81) Lambeth, Surrey, England
- Buried: 9 July 1663, Chapel of St John's College, Oxford
- Denomination: Anglican
- Parents: Richard Juxon
- Occupation: also a minister of the Crown
- Profession: Lawyer; academic
- Education: Merchant Taylors' School
- Alma mater: St John's College, Oxford
- Signature: William Juxon's signature

Ordination history of William Juxon
History
Diaconal ordination
- Date: September 1606
Priestly ordination
- Date: September 1607
Episcopal consecration
- Principal consecrator: William Laud (Cantuar)
- Co-consecrators: Richard Neile (York); Francis White (Ely); William Murray (Llandaff); John Bowle (Rochester); John Bancroft (Oxford)
- Date: 27 October 1633

William Juxon (1582 – 4 June 1663) was an English churchman, Bishop of London from 1633 to 1646 and Archbishop of Canterbury from 1660 until his death.

== Life ==
=== Education ===
Juxon was the son of Richard Juxon and was born probably in Chichester, and was educated at the local grammar school, The Prebendal School. He then went on to Merchant Taylors' School, London, and St John's College, Oxford, where he was elected to a scholarship in 1598.

=== Ecclesiastical offices ===
Juxon studied law at Oxford, but afterwards took holy orders, and in 1609 became vicar of St Giles' Church, Oxford, where he stayed until he became rector of Somerton, Oxfordshire in 1615. In December 1621, he succeeded his friend, William Laud, as President of St John's College, and in 1626 and 1627 he was Vice-Chancellor of the University of Oxford. Juxon soon obtained other important positions, including that in 1632 of Clerk of the Closet to King Charles I.

In 1627, he was made Dean of Worcester and in 1632 he was nominated to the See of Hereford and resigned the presidency of St John's in January 1633. Though he legally became Bishop of Hereford by the confirmation of his election in late July 1633, he never took up duties at Hereford, as in October 1633 he was consecrated Bishop of London in succession to Laud.

=== Secular offices ===
In March 1636 Charles I entrusted Juxon with important secular duties by making him Lord High Treasurer of England as well as First Lord of the Admiralty; for the next five years he had to deal with many financial and other difficulties. He resigned the treasurership in May 1641. During the Civil War, the bishop, against whom no charges were brought in parliament, lived undisturbed at Fulham Palace. His advice was often sought by the king, who had a very high opinion of him. The king selected Juxon to be with him on the scaffold and to offer him the last rites before his execution.

=== Retirement and archbishopric ===
Juxon was deprived of the See of London by Parliament on 9 October 1646, when the Long Parliament suppressed episcopacy. He retired to Little Compton in Gloucestershire (now in Warwickshire), where he had bought an estate, and became famous as the owner of a pack of hounds.

At the restoration of Charles II, letters missive were issued (on 2 September 1660) naming Juxon (restored Bishop of London) Archbishop of Canterbury. The congé d'élire was issued the next day and the chapter of Canterbury duly elected him on 13 September. The king's assent to the election was given on 15 September and the confirmation of Juxon's election (the legal ceremony by which he took office) was held in the Henry VII Chapel of Westminster Abbey on 20 September 1660. (Note: The bishops present to confirm Juxon's election were: Accepted Frewen, Archbishop-designate of York and Bishop of Lichfield and Coventry; Brian Duppa, Bishop-elect of Winchester and Bishop of Salisbury; William Piers, Bishop of Bath and Wells; Matthew Wren, Bishop of Ely; Robert Skinner, Bishop of Oxford; William Roberts, Bishop of Bangor; John Warner, Bishop of Rochester; and Henry King, Bishop of Chichester.) He received the temporalities on 22 September and was enthroned at Canterbury on 25 September. Juxon, as Archbishop of Canterbury, then took part in the new king's coronation, but his health soon began to fail and he died at Lambeth in 1663. By his will the archbishop was a benefactor to St John's College, where he was buried; he also aided the work of restoring St Paul's Cathedral and rebuilt the great hall at Lambeth Palace.

== Memorials ==
Juxon House, which stands north-west of St Paul's Cathedral at the top of Ludgate Hill in London and forms part of the Paternoster Square development, is named after him. Juxon Street on land at Walton Manor formerly owned by St John's College in the inner-city suburb of Jericho, Oxford, is also named after him as is another Juxon Street at Lambeth Walk, close to Juxon's former residence at Lambeth Palace.

== Arms ==
Coat of arms of William Juxon

Notes
While serving as a bishop Juxon's arms would be displayed impaled with the arms of the diocese and topped by a mitre.
Escutcheon
Or a cross Gules between four blackamoors’ heads affrontee couped at the shoulders Proper wreathed about the temples Gules.

== Notes ==
Political offices
Preceded by Robert Bertie, 1st Earl of Lindsey	First Lord of the Admiralty; 1636–1638	Succeeded by Algernon Percy, 10th Earl of Northumberland as Lord High Admiral
In commission William Laud; First Lord of the Treasury	Lord High Treasurer; 1636–1641	In commission Edward Littleton, 1st Baron Lyttleton of Mounslow; First Lord of the Treasury
Church of England titles
Preceded by Francis Godwin	Bishop of Hereford; 1633	Succeeded by Godfrey Goodman
Preceded by William Laud	Bishop of London; 1633–1646 & 1660	Vacant Title next held by Gilbert Sheldon
Vacant Title last held by William Laud	Archbishop of Canterbury; 1660–1663	Succeeded by Gilbert Sheldon
Academic offices
Preceded by William Laud	President of St John's College, Oxford; 1621–1633	Succeeded by Richard Baylie
