= Robert Levinz =

Robert Levinz, Levens or Levinge (1615 – 18 July 1650) was an English Royalist during the English Civil War.

== Life and career ==
Levinz was a son of William Levinz of Senkworth, near Abingdon, who carried on the business of a brewer at Oxford. His grandfather, William Levinz, was an alderman of Oxford, and five times mayor at the close of the sixteenth century; he was buried in All Saints Church, where there is a fine recumbent effigy to his memory. Robert was uncle of Sir Creswell Levinz, Baptist Levinz, and William Levinz. He matriculated at Lincoln College, and graduated B.A. on 4 February 1634, and D.C.L. in 1642. He was commissary in 1640 to the Bishop of Norwich, Richard Montagu (Cal. State Papers, Dom. 1640–1, pp. 394, 397).

On the outbreak of the Civil War, Levinz took up arms for the king at Oxford, and obtained the rank of captain, but on the capitulation of the city to the parliament (after the Siege of Oxford) in 1646 appears to have resumed his studies. After Charles I's execution, he was employed by Charles II in various negotiations, and finally received a commission to raise troops in England for the new king at the time of Charles's Scottish expedition in 1650. The plot was discovered, and he was arrested in London. His papers were seized, and many blank commissions signed by the king were discovered among them. Levinz was taken before the Council of State, and was handed over as a spy to the council of war. He was tried by court-martial and sentenced to be hanged. Offers were made to spare his life if he would betray his accomplices: this he refused to do, but acknowledged the truth of the accusations against himself, while protesting the justice of his cause. He was taken to Cornhill in a coach guarded by a troop of horse, and hanged against the Exchange on 18 July 1650.

David Lloyd speaks of his numerous friends, his prudence, and integrity. His wife was a daughter of Sir Peregrine Bertie, and granddaughter of Robert, Earl of Lindsey. A portrait appears in William Winstanley's Loyal Martyrology, 1665.
