= Richard Baylie =

Richard Baylie (1585 – 27 July 1667) was twice President of St John's College, Oxford, twice Vice-Chancellor of Oxford University, Archdeacon of Nottingham and Dean of the Salisbury Cathedral.

Baylie was President of St John's College, Oxford from 1633 to 1648 and 1660 to 1667. He built the Baylie Chapel at the college in 1662. In 1635, he became Dean of Salisbury and tightened discipline there, but spent most of his time in Oxford. However, it is said that, when in Salisbury, he was — 'like a cardinal' — lavishly hospitable. In 1650, he bought Honingham Hall in Norfolk from the Richardson family. Baylie married Elizabeth, the daughter of William Robinson, the Archdeacon of Nottinghamshire, who was half-brother of the Archbishop of Canterbury, William Laud. He died on 27 July 1667.

Academic offices
Preceded by William Juxon	President of St John's College, Oxford; 1633–1648	Succeeded by Francis Cheynell
Preceded by Robert Pincke	Vice-Chancellor of Oxford University; 1636–1638	Succeeded by Accepted Frewen
Preceded by Thankful Owen	President of St John's College, Oxford; 1660–1667	Succeeded by Peter Mews
Preceded by Paul Hood	Vice-Chancellor of Oxford University; 1661–1662	Succeeded by Walter Blandford
