= Harmony Cemetery (Marlowe, West Virginia) =

- U.S. National Register of Historic Places
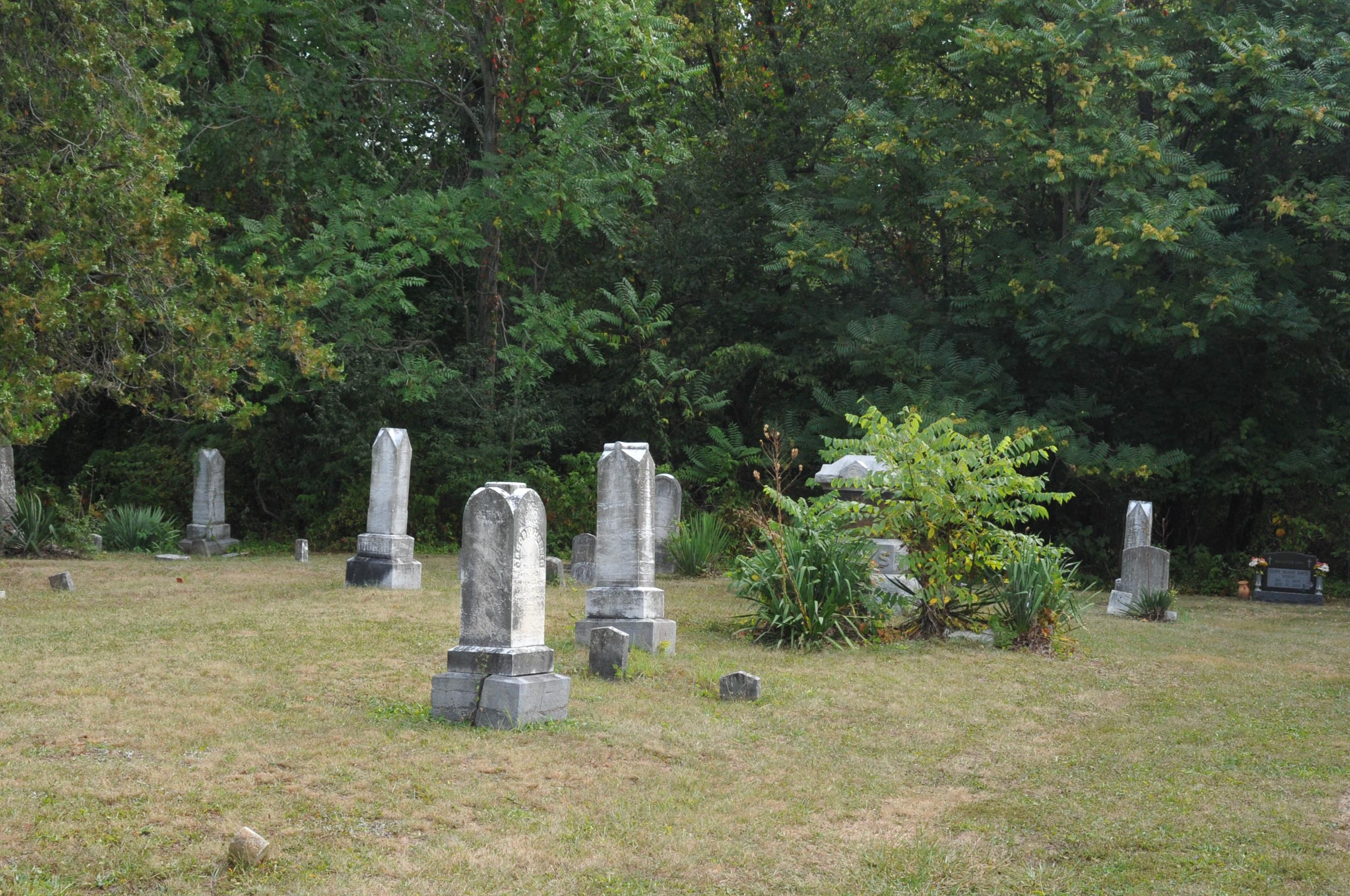

- Location within West Virginia Location within the United States
- Location: Route 1/1, near Marlowe, West Virginia
- Coordinates: 39°35′13″N 77°52′54″W
- Area: 3 acres (1.2 ha)
- Built: 1830
- MPS: Berkeley County MRA
- NRHP reference No.: 80004436
- Added to NRHP: December 10, 1980

Harmony Cemetery is a historic cemetery located near Marlowe, Berkeley County, West Virginia. It is an interdenominational burial ground established about 1830. It includes a number of notable grave markers and is the site of the old Harmony Meeting House.

It was listed on the National Register of Historic Places in 1991.
