= Evenley =

Village in Northamptonshire, England

Coordinates: 52.006°N 1.149°W

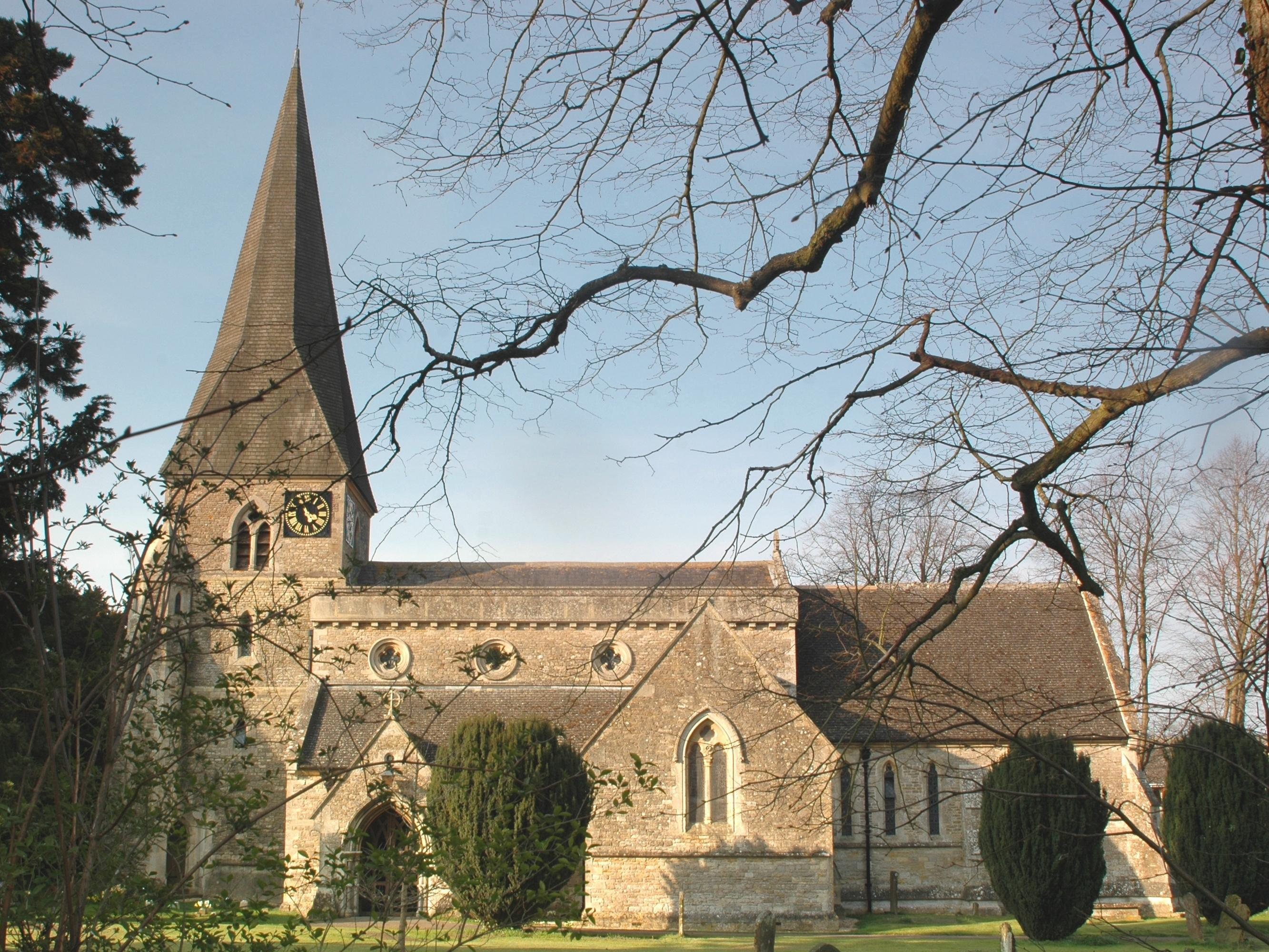
- St George's parish church

- Flag

- Location within Northamptonshire
- Population: 571 (2011 Census)
- OS grid reference: SP5834
  - London: 61 miles (98 km)
- Civil parish: Evenley
- Unitary authority: West Northamptonshire
- Ceremonial county: Northamptonshire
- Region: East Midlands
- Country: England
- Sovereign state: United Kingdom
- Post town: Brackley
- Postcode district: NN13
- Dialling code: 01280
- Police: Northamptonshire
- Fire: Northamptonshire
- Ambulance: East Midlands
- UK Parliament: South Northamptonshire
- Website: www.evenleyparishcouncil.gov.uk

Evenley is a village and civil parish just over 1 mile (1.6 km) south of Brackley in West Northamptonshire, England. The 2011 Census recorded the parish's population as 571.

The villages name means 'Level wood/clearing'.

== Geography ==
The parish is bounded by the River Great Ouse to the northeast, one of its tributaries to the northwest and on other sides by field boundaries. The parish's northeastern boundary is also part of the county boundary with Buckinghamshire. Its southeastern boundary is also part of the county boundary with Oxfordshire. The parish includes the site of the deserted medieval village of Astwick, about 1 mile (1.6 km) southwest of Evenley village.

The A43 road passes through the western part of the parish and links the village with junction 10 of the M40 motorway 5 miles (8 km) to the south-west.

== Manor ==
Evenley Manor House is a mid-17th-century building of three bays, built of ironstone and limestone.

== Evenley Hall ==
Evenley Hall is a Georgian building of five bays with Ionic columns. It was built in about 1740 for Francis Bassett. It was much altered after being damaged by a fire in 1897. It was a children's home run by the National Children's Home charity from 1941 until 2001.

== Parish church ==
Evenley had a parish church by 1535, when the Augustinian Huntingdon Priory held the rectory. Rowland Searchfield was rector in 1601.

The mediaeval building was replaced in 1864–65 by the present Church of England parish church of Saint George, designed by the Gothic Revival architect Henry Woodyer. Monuments salvaged from the old church were re-set in the present building, including a more than life-size marble statue of the barrister and judge Sir Creswell Levinz (1627–1701). It has lost its original setting, which was an architectural background with cherubs at his feet. The churchyard includes a large monument to the Pearne family that was erected before 1757.

Three bells from the old building were also re-used. Henry I Bagley of Chacombe cast the treble and fourth bells in 1632 and William Bagley cast the second bell in 1708. George Mears and Company of the Whitechapel Bell Foundry cast the third and tenor bells in 1865, completing the present ring of five. St George's also has a Sanctus bell cast by an unidentified founder in about 1699.

St George's parish is a member of the Benefice of Aynho and Croughton with Evenley and Farthinghoe and Hinton-in-the-Hedges with Steane.

== Amenities ==
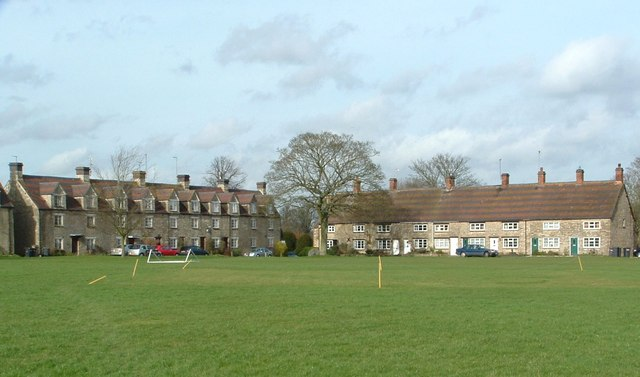
Part of Evenley village green

The village has the 18th-century Red Lion public house, a village shop with post office, a village hall and a cricket club.

The village green is roughly square and is in the centre of the village. Evenley Cricket Club plays its home games here and claims it is one of the best wickets in South Northamptonshire. The parish war memorial is on the edge of the south side of the green.

== Notable people ==
The brothers Professor William Levinz, (1625–98), Creswell Levinz (1627–1701) and Right Reverend Baptist Levinz (died 1693) were all born at Evenley. William became a doctor of medicine and Regius Professor of Greek at the University of Oxford. Creswell became Attorney General. Baptist became Bishop of Sodor and Man.
