= William Walker (principal) =

Reverend Dr William Walker
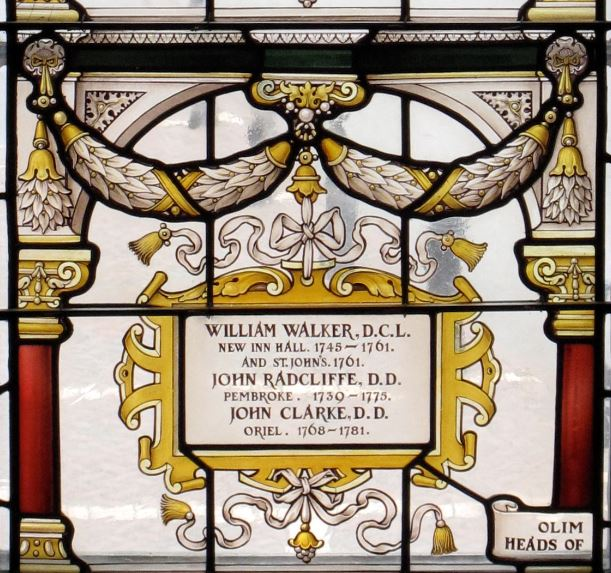
- Stained glass by C.E Kempe in the Grundy Library, Abingdon School containing the name William Walker
- Born: 1704
- Died: 18 June 1761 (aged 56–57)

William Walker (1704 – 1761) was the principal of New Inn Hall and the president of St John's College, Oxford.

== Education ==
He was educated at John Roysse's Free School in Abingdon, (now Abingdon School) until c.1719.

Matriculation at St John's College, Oxford (3 July 1719), Bachelor of Civil Law (1726), Doctor of Canon Law (1736).

== Career ==
He was the Principal of New Inn Hall from 1745 until 1761 and the President of St. John's College, Oxford from 26 July 1757 until 30 November 1757 when he resigned and returned to New Inn Hall. Both positions (Principal and President) were the positions of Head of the College.

He was rector of Barnsley, Gloucestershire (1744-1761) and Tackley (1743-1761). Walker was a Steward of the Old Abingdonian Club in 1749.

== See also ==
- List of Old Abingdonians
- List of presidents of St John's College, Oxford
