= Power Plant and Dam No. 5 (Potomac River) =

- U.S. National Register of Historic Places
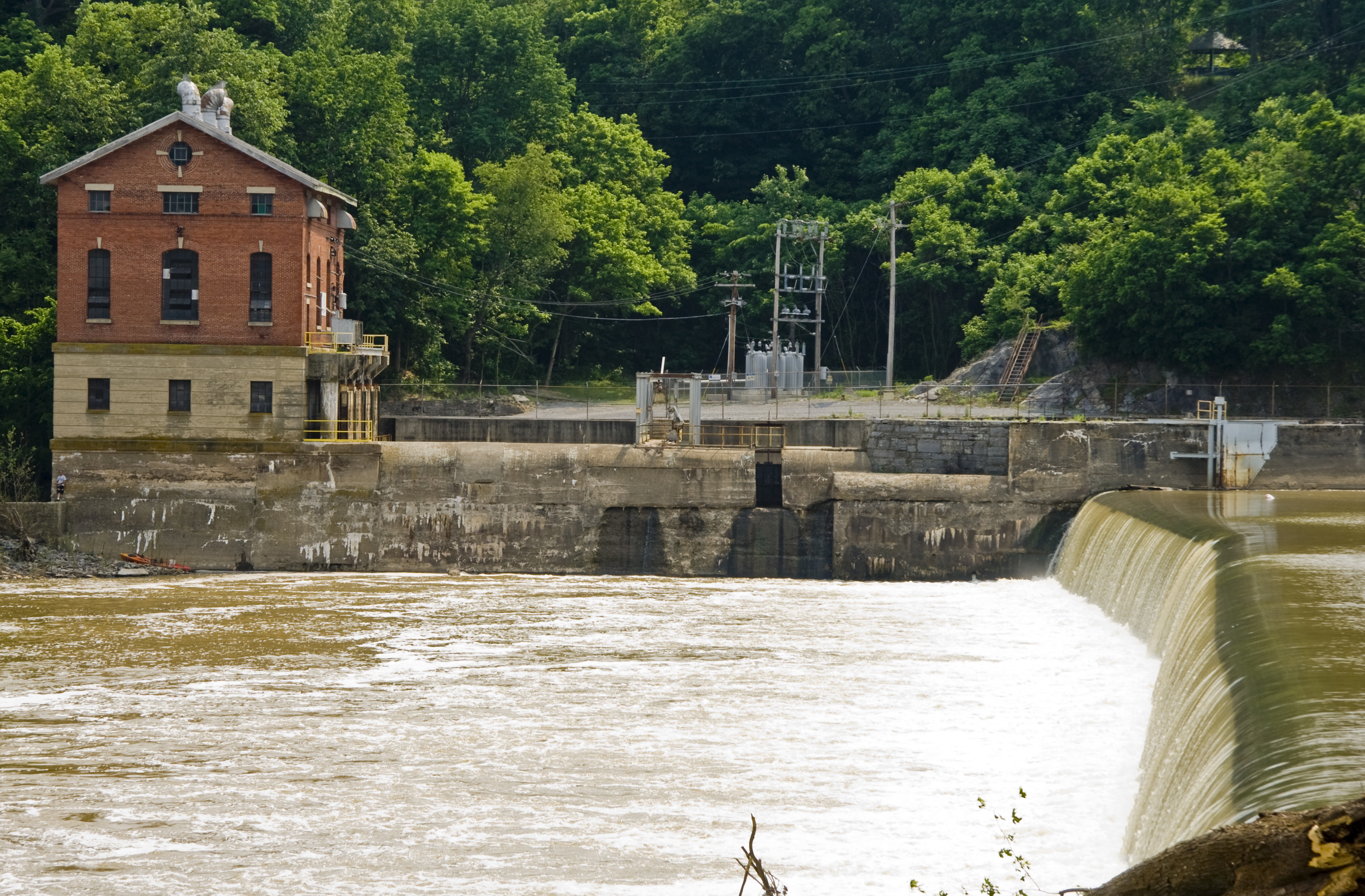

- Location within West Virginia Location within the United States
- Location: Berkeley County, West Virginia / Washington County, Maryland, USA
- Nearest city: Marlowe, West Virginia
- Coordinates: 39°36′22″N 77°55′23″W
- MPS: Berkeley County MRA
- NRHP reference No.: 80004438
- Added to NRHP: December 10, 1980

Power Plant and Dam No. 5, also known as Honeywood Dam, comprises a dam on the Potomac River, originally built for the Chesapeake and Ohio Canal, and a power plant built to take advantage of the river's flow to generate hydroelectric power. The dam is included in Chesapeake and Ohio Canal National Historical Park.

The dam was originally built to retain water for the C&O Canal in 1835. It was modified in 1993, and is 20 feet (6.1 m) tall, retaining 490 acres (200 ha) of reservoir. The 1835 dam was constructed of wood cribbing, and was attacked by Confederate forces under General Stonewall Jackson in December 1861 with the aim of destroying the dam, depriving the upper C&O Canal of water and consequently cutting off coal shipments to Washington, D.C. Two assaults by Jackson's forces failed to cause significant damage to the dam. The dam was later replaced with a stone structure, which has been upgraded with concrete.

The power plant is a two-story brick building on the West Virginia side of the river. It was built circa 1900 as the Honeywood paper mill. The first Honeywood Mill was built at the same time as the dam, in 1835 by Edward Colston. It burned a few years later and was replaced, then burned in the Civil War. The power plant is operated by FirstEnergy with a total installed capacity of 1210 kilowatts.

The dam and power plant were placed on the National Register of Historic Places in 1980.

== Little Slackwater ==
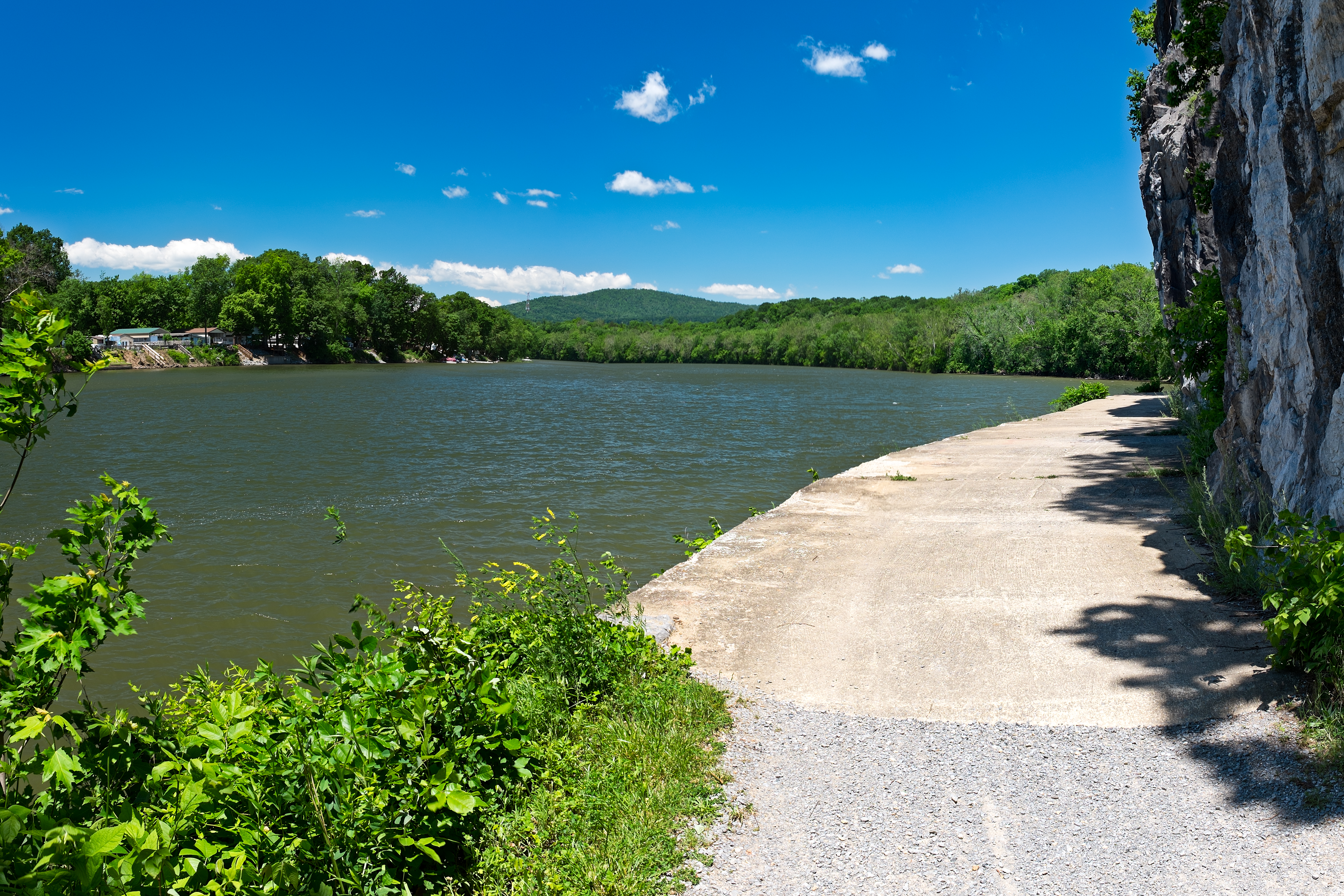
Little Slackwater. Note canal towpath on right side of photo.

The water impounded by the dam made an area that the Canallers called "Little Slackwater". At Guard Lock #5, the canal entered the river, and the boats navigated in the slackwater for about a half a mile, returning to the canal at Lock 45. For the boatmen, this was a tricky place to steer, particularly if the current was fast. On 1 May 1903, a towline broke and the boat (with people aboard) went over the dam, causing injuries and loss of life.

== See also ==
- Power Plant and Dam No. 4
