= James Bellamy (British academic) =

British academic and administrator

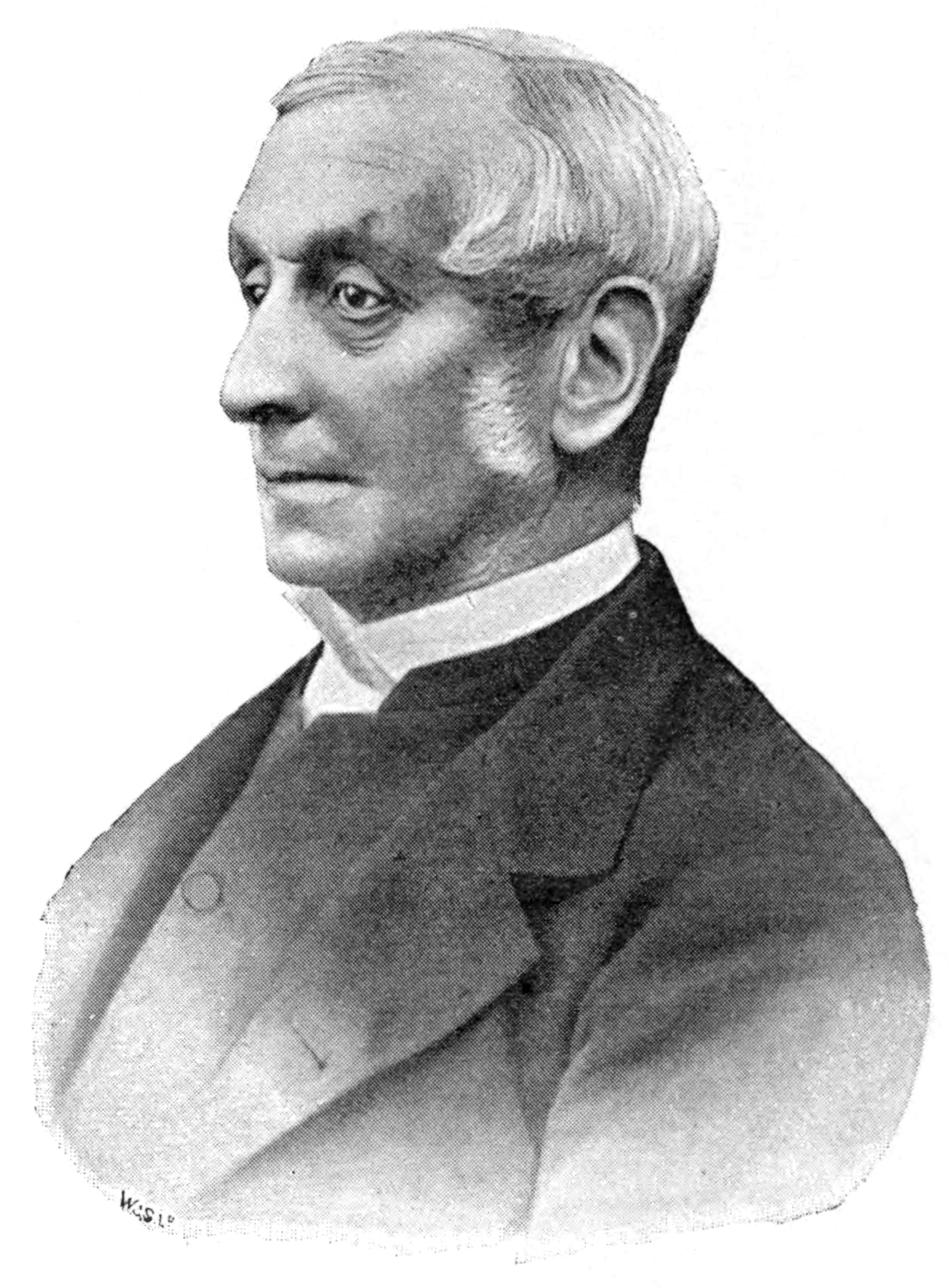
James Bellamy

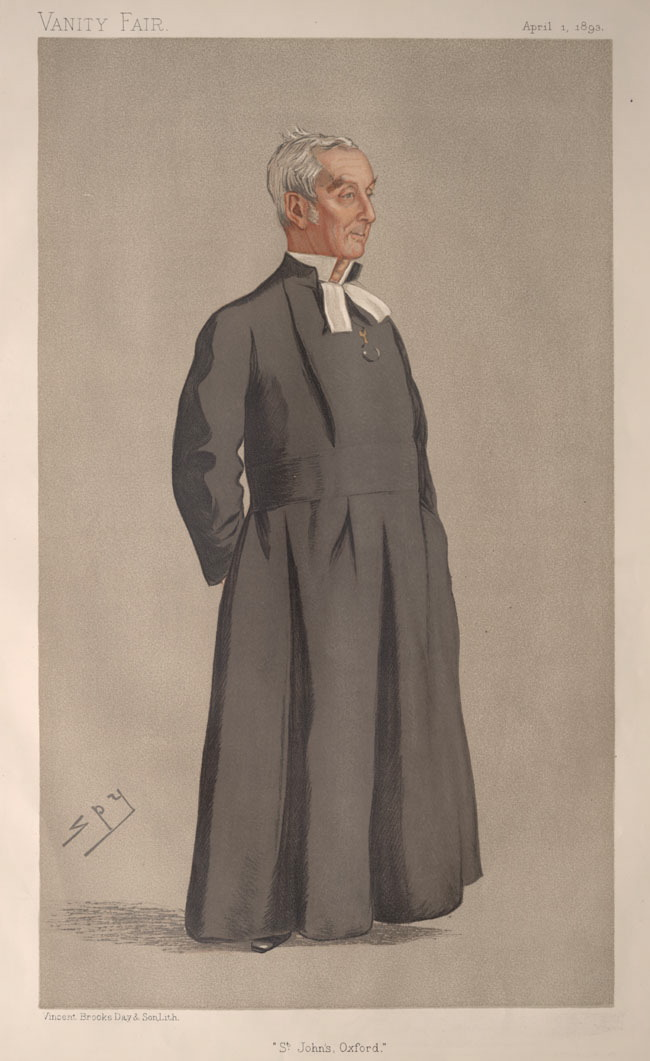
James Bellamy by "Spy" in Vanity Fair, 1 April 1893.

James Bellamy (1819–1909) was a British academic and administrator at the University of Oxford.

Bellamy was educated at Merchant Taylors' School and St John's College, Oxford, where he graduated BA in 1841 and MA in 1845. He was ordained in 1843 and was awarded a Bachelor of Divinity in 1850 followed by a Doctor of Divinity in 1872. He was President of St John's College from 1871 to 1909.

At Oxford University, Bellamy was a member of the University Commission from 1877 to 1879 and Vice-Chancellor from 1886 to 1890. He was also a conservative and musician.

== See also ==
- List of Vanity Fair (British magazine) caricatures

Academic offices
Preceded by Philip Wynter	President of St John's College, Oxford; 1871–1909	Succeeded by Herbert Armitage James
Preceded by Benjamin Jowett	Vice-Chancellor of Oxford University; 1886–1890	Succeeded by Henry Boyd
