= William Costin (academic) =

William Conrad Costin, MC (19 May 1893 – 6 October 1970) was President of St John's College, Oxford, from 1957 to 1963.

Costin was educated at Reading School and St John's College, Oxford. He served in the Great War with the Gloucestershire Regiment. He was Proctor of Oxford University in 1935. He wrote: Great Britain and China, 1833–1860, 1937; The Law and Working of the Constitution: Documents, 1660–1914, 1952; and History of St John’s College, 1598–1860, 1958.

Academic offices
Preceded by Austin Lane Poole	President of St John's College, Oxford; 1957-1963	Succeeded by John David Mabbott
