= Charles Downs II House =

Historic house in West Virginia, United States

- U.S. National Register of Historic Places
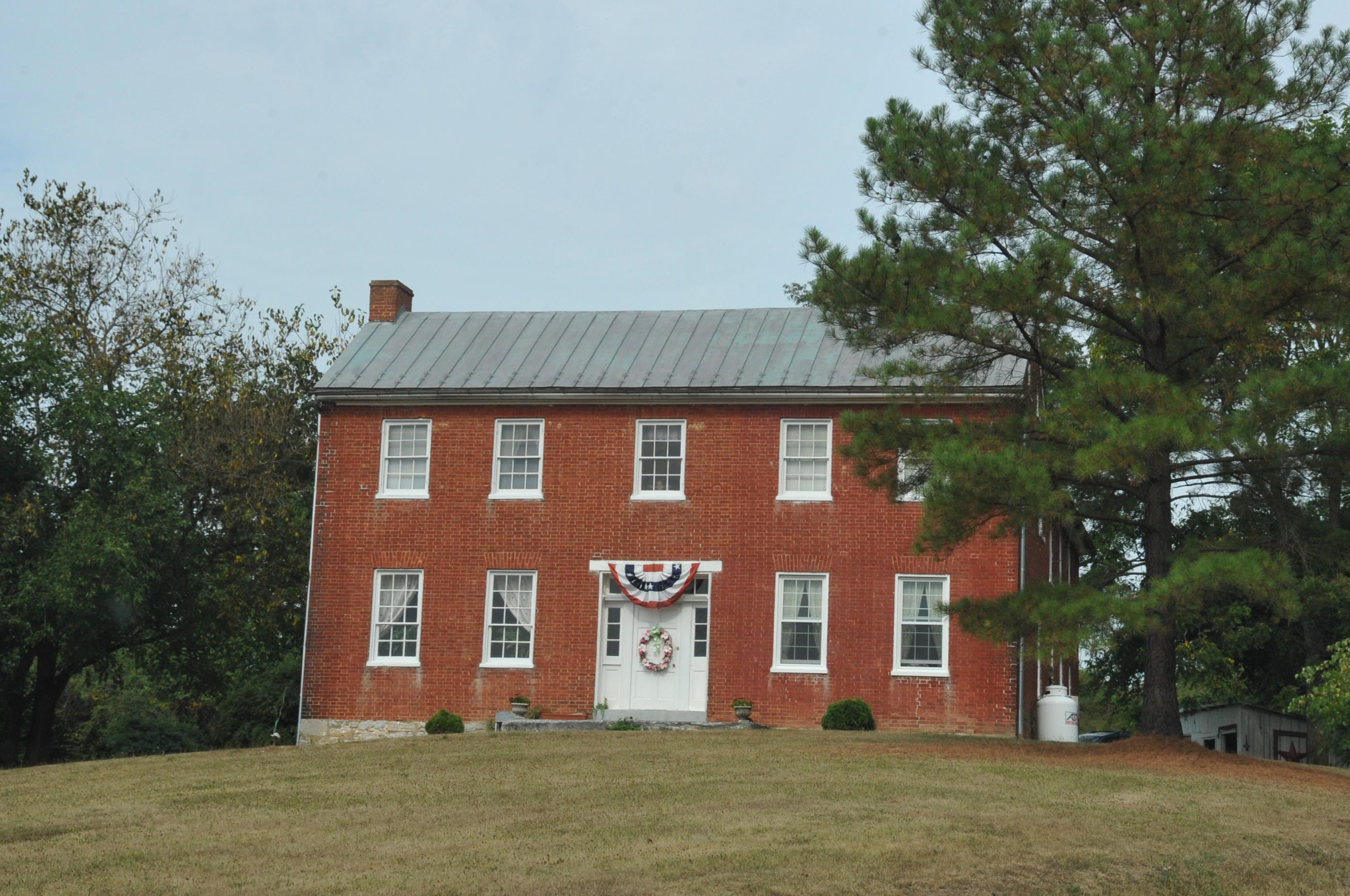

- Location within West Virginia Location within the United States
- Nearest city: West Virginia Secondary Route 1, west of U.S. Route 11, near Marlowe, West Virginia
- Coordinates: 39°34′19″N 77°53′36″W
- Area: 2 acres (0.81 ha)
- Built: 1835
- Architectural style: Federal
- NRHP reference No.: 91000554
- Added to NRHP: May 17, 1991

Charles Downs II House is a historic home located near Marlowe, Berkeley County, West Virginia. It was built in 1835 and is a two-story, L-shaped, brick dwelling measuring 53 feet wide and 50 feet deep. It is five bays wide and three bays deep. Also on the property are a cement block garage and wood-frame shed dating to the 1920s.

It was listed on the National Register of Historic Places in 1991.
