= Peregrine Bertie (MP for Lincolnshire) =

Jacobean soldier and landowner

Sir Peregrine Bertie KB (c. 1584–1639) was a Jacobean soldier and landowner from Lincolnshire. He represented that county in Parliament in 1614, attended to local land improvements, and took part in several wars on the continent. He and his elder brother Lord Willoughby were frequently at odds with Lord Norreys.

Peregrine was the second son of the famous Elizabethan soldier Peregrine Bertie, 13th Baron Willoughby de Eresby. He was admitted to Corpus Christi College, Cambridge in 1594. He travelled to France in 1599. When his father died in 1601, Peregrine inherited a manor in Norfolk and the reversion of Willoughby House in London. He was admitted to the Middle Temple in 1605.

In 1610, Bertie obtained a place as a gentleman of the privy chamber to Prince Henry, and was created a Knight of the Bath on 2 June, when Henry was invested as Prince of Wales. Later that year, he fought a duel with Lord Norreys, an inveterate enemy of Peregrine's brother Lord Willoughby, and in consequence was seriously wounded in the shoulder. By 1611, both brothers had become officers in the Dutch Army.

In 1612, Peregrine had become a member of the Virginia Company, and went abroad to Spa that year for his health. Prince Henry died at the end of the year, and in the fall of 1613, Peregrine went abroad again and fought another duel with Lord Norreys, much to the displeasure of King James. In 1614, he contested Lincolnshire with the courtier Sir Thomas Monson and was returned as its junior knight of the shire to the Addled Parliament. No record of his activity there has been preserved. By the end of the year, he was suffering from a dangerous illness and his death was rumored, providing Lord Norreys with an opportunity for reconciliation. However, they were not long composed, as they were quarreling again by the autumn of 1615.

Peregine wrote to his brother Robert from court in 1615 mentioning George Villiers in Ben Jonson's play or masque, Mercury Vindicated from the Alchemists at Court, where three women appeared in curious attires, who caught the attention of all, including the king. Pergrine said the married women at court were dressed in black.

By this time, Peregrine had married Margaret (d. 1642), the daughter of Sir Nicholas Saunderson, 1st Baronet, by whom he had three sons, Robert, Peregrine, and Nicholas, and three daughters, Mildred (married Robert Levinz (d. 1650)), Sophia, and Elizabeth (married Francis Barnard). In 1619, he became a member of the Amazon Company (an attempt to colonize Guyana), and was appointed a gamekeeper of Ancaster heath. He volunteered to join the relief of the Palatinate led by Sir Horace Vere in 1620, but did not actually go abroad; in the following year, he was made a justice of the peace for the Parts of Lindsey.

Bertie was appointed a commissioner for recusants in Lincolnshire in 1624. He and Lord Willoughby again went abroad that year to fight the Spanish in the Netherlands. In the following year, he was commissioned a major of foot, and was appointed to various commissions for land improvement in Lincolnshire (Deeping Fen and the River Glen) while abroad. He was subsequently recalled and appointed a colonel of foot, commanding a regiment in the disastrous Île de Ré expedition. This was his last campaign; he afterwards returned to work on fen drainage, which would bring him into conflict with the Bishop of Ely. Made a freeman of Boston, Lincolnshire in 1634, he was appointed a commissioner of swans in 1635, and died of gout in 1639. He was buried on 13 November at St Giles in the Fields.

Parliament of England
Preceded by John Sheffield; Sir Valentine Browne	Member of Parliament for Lincolnshire; 1614; With: Sir George Manners	Succeeded by Sir George Manners; Thomas Grantham
