= Frederick William Hall (academic) =

British academic administrator

Frederick William Hall (3 December 1867 – 11 October 1933) was an English classical scholar and academic who served as President of St John's College, Oxford, from 18 December 1931 until his death in 1933.

Hall was born in Stoke Newington, the only son of banker William Hall of the London and County Bank. He was educated at St Paul's School, London and read classics at Trinity College, Oxford. He earned his B.A.in 1890 and took first-class honours in Classical Moderations (1888) and Literae Humaniores (1890). In 1893, Westminster School headmaster William Gunion Rutherford appointed him to a mastership. In 1897, he was elected a Fellow of St John's, Oxford and appointed a Lecturer in Classics. He published the important book Companion to Classical Texts (1913) and was a contributor to an updated edition of Liddell and Scott, and to periodicals Classical Review and Classical Quarterly, and was editor of the latter from 1911–30. He was recognised as an authority on Plautus.

In 1932, he earned a D.Litt. from St John's. He died unmarried in a London nursing home following complications from surgery, at age 65.

Academic offices
Preceded by Herbert Armitage James	President of St John's College, Oxford; 1931–1933	Succeeded by Cyril Norwood
