= Henry Boyd (academic) =

English painter

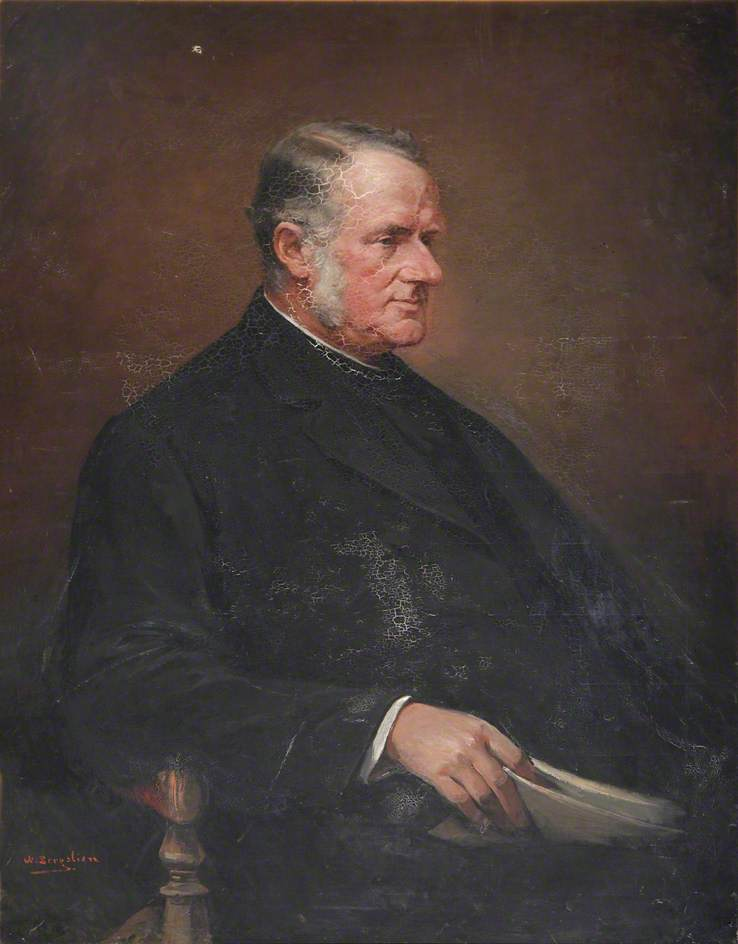

Henry Boyd (1831 – 4 March 1922) was a British clergyman, academic, and administrator at the University of Oxford.

Boyd attained a BA degree from Hertford College, Oxford. He was ordained in 1854 and was perpetual curate at St Mark's, Victoria Docks in Silvertown, London, from 1862 to 1874. He became a Fellow at Hertford College in 1872 and Principal from 1877 to 1922. He was a friend of James Duncan (Sugar refiner, art collector), together they helped to improve the working conditions in London's East End during the 1870s. He commissioned the architect Sir Thomas Jackson to enlarge and improve the college, including a new hall and chapel, completed in 1907.

At Oxford University, Boyd was Vice-Chancellor from 1890 to 1894. He was Master of the Worshipful Company of Drapers (1896–97). He was also a watercolour painter.

Henry Boyd died on 4 March 1922.

Academic offices
Preceded by Richard Michell	Principal of Hertford College, Oxford; 1877–1922	Succeeded by Sir Walter Riddell
Preceded by James Bellamy	Vice-Chancellor of Oxford University; 1890–1894	Succeeded by John Richard Magrath
