= William Levinz =

William Levinz (25 July 1625 – 3 March 1698), doctor of medicine and Regius Professor of Greek at Oxford University, was President of St John's College, Oxford, from 1673 until 1698.

== Life ==
He was the son of William Levinz of Evenley, near Brackley, Northamptonshire; and brother of Creswell Levinz and Baptist Levinz. Robert Levinz was his uncle. He was educated at Merchant Taylors' School, proceeded as probationary fellow to St. John's College, Oxford, in 1641, and became a fellow in 1644, taking the degree of B.A. in 1645, and M.A. in 1649. He refused to submit to the authority of the parliamentary visitors of the university in 1648; but his name occurs continuously in the college register. He was Terræ filius in 1651.

At the reception of the chancellor Edward Hyde on 9 September 1661 Levinz, though ill, made a speech. He took holy orders, and proceeded to the degree of M.D. in 1666. On 10 October 1673 he was elected President of his college. In 1678 he was made sub-dean of Wells Cathedral, and canon residentiary in 1682, Peter Mews, then Bishop of Bath and Wells, being a former President of St John's. Levinz was Greek reader from about July 1661, and regius professor of Greek from 24 November 1665 to 1698. He died suddenly, while addressing a college meeting, on 3 March 1698. He was buried in St. John's College chapel, with monument, describing him as optime literatus, mansuetus, modestus, justus, pius. He was unmarried.

== Works ==
According to a manuscript note in the Bodleian Library copy, Levinz was the author of a history of the year 1660, Appendicula de Rebus Britannicis, which was printed anonymously in the third (1663) and subsequent editions of the Flosculi Historici Delibati nunc Delibatiores redditi sive Historia Universalis of the Jesuit Jean de Bussières.

Academic offices
Preceded by Peter Mews	President of St John's College, Oxford; 1673–1698	Succeeded by William Delaune
