= Mabbutt =

Mabbutt is a surname. Notable people with the surname include:

- Gary Mabbutt (born 1961), English footballer, son of Ray and brother of Kevin
- Kevin Mabbutt (born 1958), English footballer
- Ray Mabbutt (1936–2016), English footballer

== See also ==
- Mabbott
