= Samuel Dennis (academic) =

English academic administrator

Samuel Dennis, D.D., was an English academic administrator at the University of Oxford.

Dennis was elected President (head) of St John's College, Oxford in 1772, a post he held until 1795. During his time at St John's College, more rooms were added on the north side of the college. Dennis was also Vice-Chancellor of Oxford University from 1780 until 1784.

A monument was erected in the college to his memory in 1795, sculpted by Richard Westmacott (the elder).

Academic offices
Preceded by Thomas Fry	President of St John's College, Oxford; 1772–1795	Succeeded by Michael Marlow
Preceded by George Horne	Vice-Chancellor of Oxford University; 1780–1784	Succeeded by Joseph Chapman
