= George Gent =

Anglican priest (1852–1898)

George William Gent (14 October 1852 – 8 May 1898) was a nineteenth century Anglican priest and teacher.

Gent was educated at Rossall and then at University College, Oxford, where he took a first in Greats. He taught classics at Llandovery College for four years; during that time he was ordained by Basil Jones in 1877. After curacies in Llandovery and Westminster he was a Tutor at Keble College, Oxford, from 1882 to 1887. He was Principal of St Mark's College, Chelsea from 1887 to 1897; and then of St David's College, Lampeter from then until his death.
