= Marlowe (name) =

Marlowe is both a surname and a given name. Notable people with the name include:

== Surname ==
- Andrew W. Marlowe, American screenwriter
- Ann Marlowe, American critic, journalist and writer
- Anthony Marlowe, multiple people
- Charley Marlowe (born 2000), English media personality
- Chris Marlowe (born 1951), American sportscaster
- Christopher Marlowe (1564–1593), English dramatist, poet and translator
- Deb Marlowe, American author
- Derek Marlowe (1938–1996), English writer
- Evan Marlowe, American film director, writer, and editor
- Fernanda Marlowe (born 1942), British actress
- Frank Marlowe (1904–1964), American character actor
- Gary Marlowe (born 1967), German musician
- Hugh Marlowe (1911–1982), American actor
- Julia Marlowe (1866–1950), actress
- June Marlowe (Gisela Valaria Goetten) (1903–1984), American silent-film actress best known for the Our Gang series
- June Marlowe (Martha Jane Black) (born 1918–1919), American actress and singer best known for her roles in Argentine classical cinema
- Lara Marlowe, journalist
- Marion Marlowe (1929–2012), American singer and actress
- Mary Marlowe (1884–1962), Australian actress, writer and journalist
- Missy Marlowe (born 1971), American Olympic gymnast
- Paul Marlowe, Canadian author
- Scott Marlowe (1932–2001), American actor
- Stephen Marlowe (1928–2008), American author
- Sylvia Marlowe (1908–1981), American harpsichordist
- William Marlowe (1932–2004), British actor

== Given name ==
- Marlowe Morris (1915–1977 or 1978), American jazz musician
- Marlowe Parker, American artist
- Marlowe Peyton (born 2004), American singer and actor
- Marlowe Sturridge (born 2012), daughter of Sienna Miller and Tom Sturridge
- Marlowe Wax (born 2002), American football player

== Fictional characters ==
- Marlowe Viccellio, from the TV series Psych
- Jennifer Marlowe, character in WKRP in Cincinnati
- Natalie Marlowe, from the daytime soap opera All My Children
- Philip Marlowe, a fictional detective created by author Raymond Chandler
- Preston Marlowe, from the Battlefield Bad Company games
- Marlowe, from the TV series 6teen
- Katherine Marlowe, from the videogame Uncharted 3: Drake's Deception

== See also ==
- Marlow (disambiguation)
- Marlo
