= Peter Marlow =

Peter Marlow may refer to:

- Peter Marlow (athlete) (born 1941), British racewalker
- Peter Marlow (photographer) (1952–2016), British photographer and photojournalist.
