= Philip Wynter =

English clergyman and academic

Philip Wynter D.D. (1793–1871) was an English clergyman and academic.

== Career ==
Wynter was the President of St John's College, Oxford, from 1828 to 1871, and the editor of the works of Joseph Hall. While President at St John's College, he was also Vice-Chancellor of Oxford University from 1840 until 1844.

== Family ==
Wynter married twice: firstly to Harriette Ann, the daughter of Capt. Henry Boyle Deane of Hurst Grove in Berkshire; secondly, to Diana Ann Taylor. He had a large family and his daughter by his second marriage, Harriette Ann, was the mother of the Liberal politician, Philip Morrell.

Academic offices
Preceded by Michael Marlow	President of St John's College, Oxford; 1828–1871	Succeeded by James Bellamy
Preceded by Ashhurst Turner Gilbert	Vice-Chancellor of Oxford University; 1840–1844	Succeeded by Benjamin Parsons Symons
