= Marlow Town Regatta and Festival =

Rowing event

Marlow Town Regatta and Festival (MTRF) is a rowing regatta and festival held in Marlow on the River Thames in southern England.

Marlow's annual rowing regatta was founded in 1855. The first MTRF in its current form was held on 16 June 2001 and was opened by the joint MTRF presidents, Sir Steve and Lady Redgrave (the five-time gold medal-winning Olympic rower and his wife). The regatta is held three weeks before the more famous Henley Royal Regatta, upriver from Marlow at Henley-on-Thames. The MTRF remains a major event in the town and surrounding areas social calendars. The Saturday Regatta is a ticket event run on a not for profit basis by a volunteer organising committee. The Sunday of the weekend hosts a family festival named the Marlow Festival which is free entry and also hosts the Marlow Dragon Boat festival during the day.

== See also ==
- The Marlow Regatta, at Dorney Lake
- Henley Festival at Henley-on-Thames
- Rowing on the River Thames
