= John David Mabbott =

British academic (1898–1988)

John David Mabbott (Duns, 18 November 1898 – Islip, Oxfordshire, 26 January 1988) was a British classicist who worked as the president of St John's College, Oxford, from 1963 to 1969.

== Education ==
Mabbott was educated at Berwickshire High School, the University of Edinburgh, and St John's.

== Career ==
Mabbott was a lecturer in classics at the University of Reading from 1922 to 1923; and then a Lecturer at the University College of North Wales from 1923 to 1924. He was fellow of St John's from 1924 to 1963; tutor from 1930 to 1956; and senior tutor from 1956 to 1963. He wrote: 'The State and the Citizen', 1948; 'An Introduction to Ethics', 1966; 'John Locke', 1973; and 'Oxford Memories', 1986.

During World War II, Mabbott was commissioned by the Foreign Office to produce reports on popular transfers after the war, in particular the feasibility of forcible expulsion of ethnic Germans from Poland and Czechoslovakia.

Academic offices
Preceded by William Conrad Costin	President of St John's College, Oxford; 1963–1969	Succeeded by Richard William Southern
