= Marlowe, West Virginia =

Marlowe
- Unincorporated community
- U.S. Route 11 northbound in Marlowe

- Location within the state of West Virginia Marlowe (the United States)
- Coordinates: 39°35′18″N 77°51′34″W
- Country: United States
- State: West Virginia
- County: Berkeley
- Elevation: 515 ft (157 m)
- Time zone: UTC-5 (Eastern (EST))
  - Summer (DST): UTC-4 (EDT)
- GNIS feature ID: 1542770

Marlowe is an unincorporated community on U.S. Route 11 in Berkeley County, West Virginia, United States.

Sites on the National Register of Historic Places located near Marlowe are: the Charles Downs II House, Harmony Cemetery, Marlowe Consolidated School, and Power Plant and Dam No. 5.

== Schools ==
- Marlowe Elementary School

== See also ==
- Falling Waters, West Virginia
