= Marlow Regatta =

Rowing event

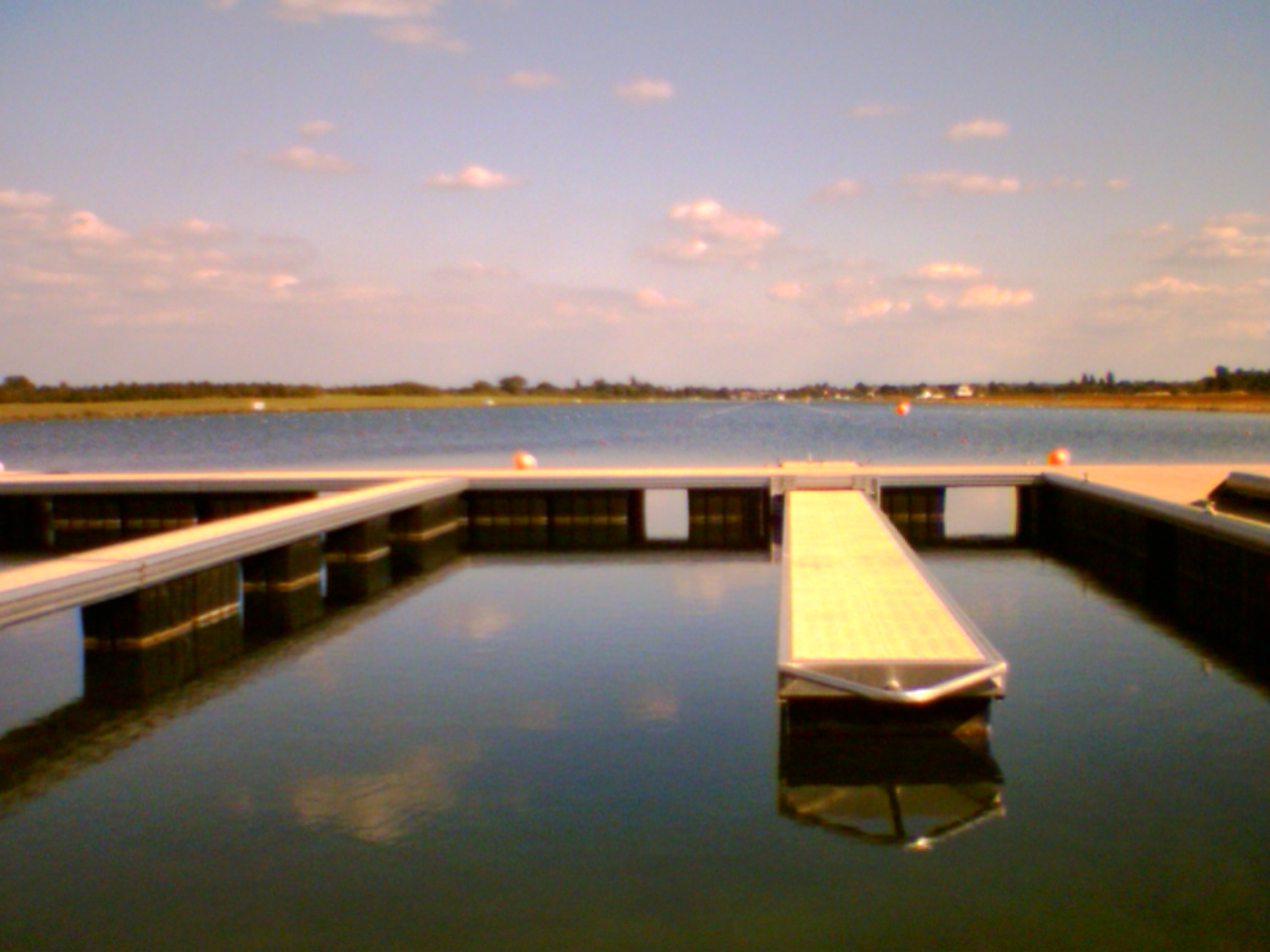
Dorney Lake, location of the Marlow Regatta since 2001.

The Marlow Regatta is an international rowing regatta, that takes place annually at Dorney Lake, Buckinghamshire near Eton next to the River Thames in southern England. It attracts crews from schools, clubs and universities from around the United Kingdom, Europe and the United States. The regatta takes place on the same weekend as Henley Women's Regatta and two weeks before Henley Royal Regatta.

== History ==
In 2001, after 145 years on the River Thames in Marlow, the regatta moved to the multi-lane rowing course at Dorney Lake, Eton (near Windsor). This move has allowed the regatta to expand and to attract a larger number of international competitors.

Marlow Regatta is one of the top events in the British rowing calendar and attracts top crews from schools, clubs and universities from around the UK, Europe and the USA.

The regatta takes place two weeks prior to Henley Royal Regatta and for some competitors this will be the last chance to pre-qualify for Henley Royal. Racing takes place on Saturday between 08:30 and 19:00, with heats, repechages and finals, and for some years in the past also took place on the Sunday. Races use 6–7 lanes of the 10 lane 2000m lake.

2007 saw the first two-day Marlow Regatta at Dorney, with over 11 hours of racing on the Saturday and racing on the Sunday for the first time.

== See also ==
- Marlow Town Regatta, held in Marlow
- Rowing on the River Thames
