= Herbert Armitage James =

Welsh cleric and educator

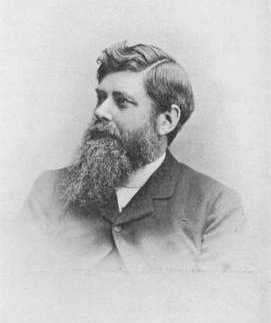
- Dr James in 1905, when Headmaster of Rugby School
- Born: 3 August 1844; Kirkdale, Liverpool, England
- Died: 15 November 1931 (aged 87); St John's College, Oxford, England
- Resting place: Wolvercote Cemetery
- Occupations: Headmaster and college principal

Herbert Armitage James, CH (3 August 1844 – 15 November 1931) was a Welsh cleric and headmaster of three leading public schools, who ended his "remarkable scholastic career", as it was later described by Austen Chamberlain, by becoming President of St John's College, Oxford. After an Oxford education and early teaching career at Marlborough College, he was headmaster of Rossall School from 1875 to 1886. It was said that he raised the school "to a pitch of all-round excellence which it had not known before". After suffering from health problems at Rossall, he served as Dean of St Asaph from 1886 to 1889. He returned to teaching in 1889, becoming headmaster of Cheltenham College and remaining in this post until 1895, despite being offered the position of headmaster of Clifton College. He then became headmaster of Rugby School and served there to great acclaim. His Rugby School nickname of "The Bodger" is still in use at the school. He left Rugby School in 1909 to become President of St John's College, Oxford, a position he held until his death 22 years later.

He was a highly respected teacher and preacher, being described as one of the best preachers of his day. He was widely praised for his work at Rossall, Cheltenham, Rugby and St John's. He was made a member of the Order of the Companions of Honour by King George V in 1926. At a dinner in his honour held to mark this award, attended by over 200 friends and former students, he was described by Austen Chamberlain (the Secretary of State for Foreign Affairs) as "one of the greatest and most forceful characters who had ever devoted himself to education". The Lord Chancellor, Viscount Cave, also spoke at the dinner to praise James's directness in his opinions and decisions, his weighty judgment, his high character and his kindly nature.

== Early life and education ==
He was born in Kirkdale, Liverpool, on 3 August 1844, the son of the Rev. Dr. David James, rector of Panteg, Monmouthshire. He was educated at King Henry VIII Grammar School, Abergavenny, and then studied at two Oxford colleges. He matriculated at Jesus College in 1863, before winning a scholarship and moving to Lincoln College in 1864, obtaining a first-class degree in Literae Humaniores in 1867. He was appointed a Fellow of St John's College in 1869 and was President of the Oxford Union Society in 1871 (where he nominated H. H. Asquith to the Standing Committee). He was then ordained, and received his Bachelor of Divinity degree in 1874. Later, on 31 May 1895, he was awarded the degree of Doctor of Divinity, having previously been excused by the university from satisfying the requirements normally set for the award of the degree.

== Teaching career ==
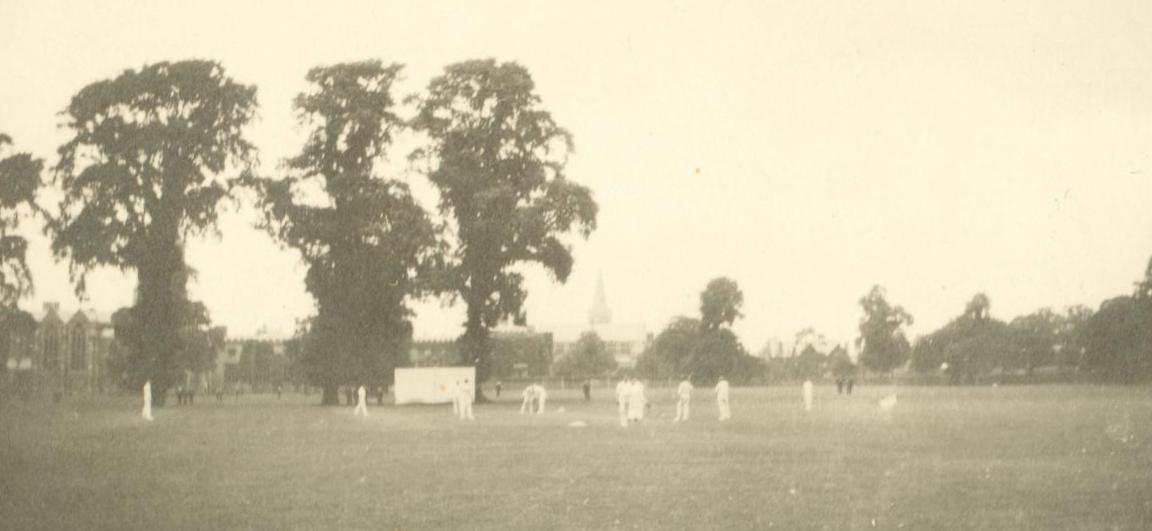
The University of Pennsylvania cricket team competing in a match against Rugby School in 1907, during James's time as headmaster.

He was Assistant Master at Marlborough College from 1872 to 1875 before being appointed Headmaster of Rossall School in 1875. On the last day of his first year as headmaster, the whole school (with the exception of a couple of students) gathered outside the school to hiss and boo at James. Despite this, he held this position until 1886 and was regarded as having been "brilliantly successful, raising the school in the 11 years of his reign to a pitch of all-round excellence which it had not known before". His students at Rossall included Henry Stuart-Jones, who became a distinguished classical scholar. One of Stuart-Jones's contemporaries later gave James the credit for making Stuart-Jones an "accurate and industrious scholar".

The strain of his position at Rossall School having affected his health, he was appointed Dean of St Asaph in 1886. In 1889, his health restored, he left St Asaph to become Principal of Cheltenham College (1889–95). He was again successful in this post, and was offered the position of Headmaster of Clifton College, but was prevailed upon to stay. He made participation in games a compulsory part of the boys' education in 1889. He also started the building of a new chapel to mark the college's centenary in 1891. When Dr Percival was appointed Bishop of Hereford, James succeeded him in 1895 as Headmaster of Rugby School. He was headmaster for 14 years and was very well regarded: it was said that the school had "seldom stood higher since Arnold's day" than under his leadership (in reference to Thomas Arnold, who was headmaster from 1828 to 1841). He was also described in his obituary in The Times as having "once more showed himself a complete master of his profession, equally effective and esteemed in the class-room and the pulpit, in the School House of Dr. Arnold, and on the playing fields." He was nicknamed "The Bodger", and this term is still part of Rugby School slang. King Edward VII visited Rugby School towards the end of James's time as headmaster on 3 July 1909, the first royal visit to the School.

== St John's College ==
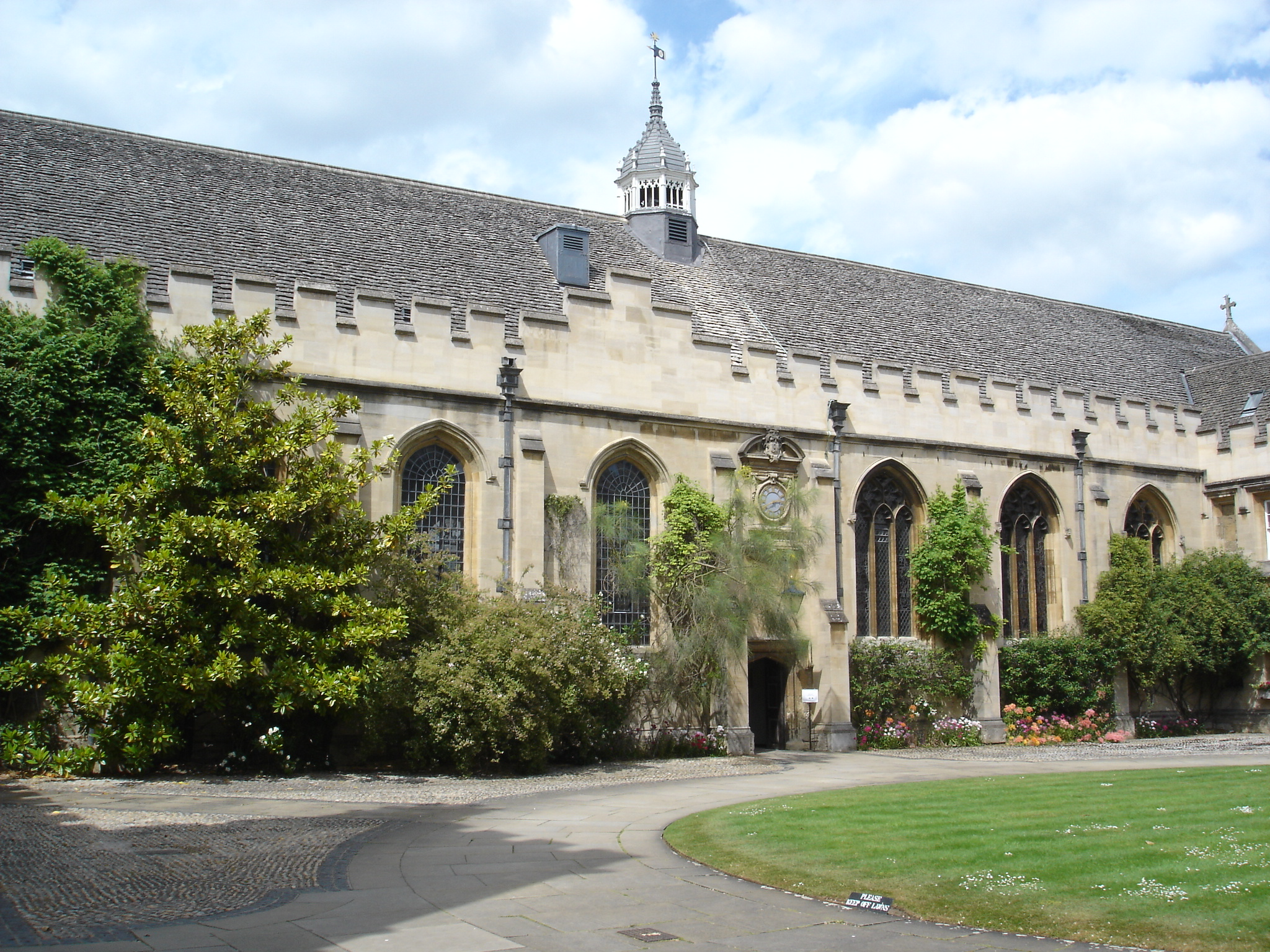
St John's College, Oxford

He returned to Oxford in 1909 as President of St John's College (having been made an honorary fellow in 1895) and held this position until his death in 1931. He was regarded during this time as a leader for the causes of the church and the Conservative Party, and was described as "winning all hearts with his geniality, his good sense, and his readiness to help all with whom he was brought into contact." In 1918, during his time as college President, his photograph was taken for inclusion in the collection of the National Portrait Gallery.

He was made a Member of the Order of the Companions of Honour by King George V in the 1926 Birthday Honours. On 15 October 1926, over two hundred friends and former students attended a dinner held in his honour at the Hotel Victoria to celebrate the award, with Viscount Cave (who was Lord Chancellor and also Chancellor of Oxford University) presiding. Other guests included Viscount Lee, Sir Maurice Hankey (the Cabinet Secretary), the sculptor Sir George Frampton, the civil servant Ernest Gowers (who had been educated at Rugby when James was headmaster) and the MP Sir James Agg-Gardner. Austen Chamberlain (the Secretary of State for Foreign Affairs and a governor of Rugby School) spoke, along with representatives of the other schools with which he had been associated. Lord Cave praised James's directness in his opinions and decisions, his weighty judgment, his high character and his kindly nature. He said that membership of the Companionship of Honour had been given only to a few who had rendered "special social service" to the country, and he rejoiced that James had been "enrolled" in this "select band". He added that St John's College and Oxford University owed James a "debt of gratitude" for his "wise advice and guidance". James, he said, "had never dealt in the fine shades, or in the analysis of tendencies, or the exploration of avenues. Whatever was right had to be done. Whatever was wrong he fought with all his might."

Marlborough School paid tribute to James through a poem by Charles Larcom Graves. One stanza was later quoted in the obituary of James published by The Times:

Unversed in any of the arts
That aim at winning mass approval,
He found his way into our hearts
From which he still defies removal.
He played our games; he gained our trust;
He was both honoured and respected,
For he was vigorously just,
And absolutely unaffected.

Chamberlain said that James had had a "remarkable scholastic career" and had exercised a "great and powerful influence" in the schools that he had served, leaving behind "a memory dear to all who had known him". He said that James was regarded as "one of the greatest and most forceful characters who had ever devoted himself to education." The dinner itself was reported as a news item in The Times on the following day, with a list of the principal attendees and summaries of the main speeches, and of James's response, in which he said that he regarded the honour he had received as one bestowed on teaching.

== Works and interests ==
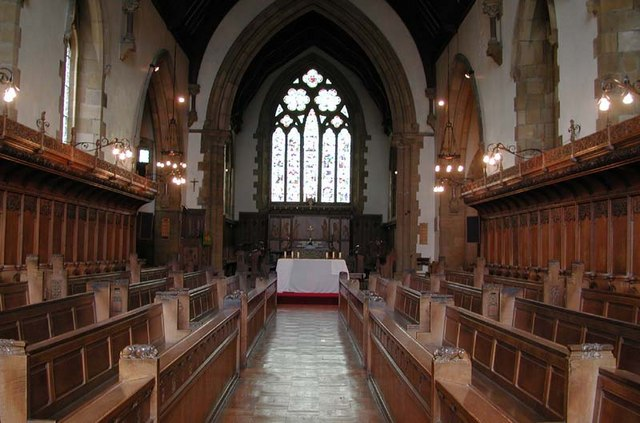
Rossall School chapel, where a memorial tablet to James was erected in 1933.

His publications included an edition with English notes of Cicero's Pro Plancio (1871) and a collection of sermons from his time at Rossall School, published as School Ideals (1887). He was very highly regarded as a preacher, being appointed as Select Preacher for Oxford University in 1894, 1897 and 1900; he was said to be "undoubtedly one of the best preachers of his day, at school and elsewhere". He was a keen cricketer and golfer, and had been captain of the Lincoln College XI when a student there. He was also said to have been a useful member of the St John's College XI, both for his batting and his slow bowling. The story was told at the 1926 dinner in his honour that he had taught A G Steel how to bowl a "twister", and that Steel had gone on to take many wickets in test matches against the Australians as a result. He was devoted to philately and had what was regarded as one of the best stamp collections in England. On his death, it was estimated as being worth between £5,000 and £6,000 (approximately £290,000 to £350,000 as of 2025), despite the fact that he had dispersed much of his collection before his death.

== Death and memorials ==
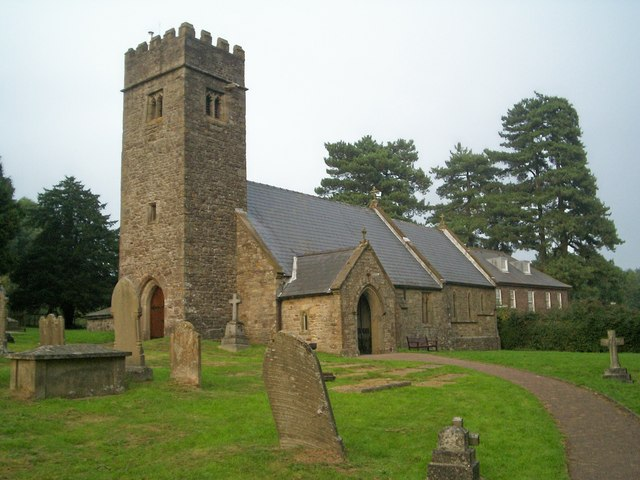
St Mary's Church, Panteg

James died at St John's College on 15 November 1931 at the age of 87. After a funeral service at St Giles's Church, Oxford, he was buried in Wolvercote Cemetery. In his will, he left £2,000 to the Church in Wales and £200 to the Rector of St Mary's Church, Panteg, to maintain the graves of his parents and for church work in the parish. He also left money to his old school in Abergavenny, Lincoln College, St John's College and the schools at which he had been headmaster. He also left a sum to the Royal Philatelic Society. After other various bequests, he left the residue of his estate to his brother for life – as James had never married, his brother was his next of kin. After his brother's death, his estate was to pass to St John's College to assist undergraduates and to support the work of the choir.

James had been presented with a gold watch and chain when leaving his position as headmaster of Rossall School in 1886. These were sold after his death, and were donated back to Rossall School by the purchaser (a former student of the school) for the use of future headmasters. A memorial tablet to James was erected in 1933 in the chapel of Rossall School; it was unveiled by Lord Derby, president of the Rossall School Corporation. A oak chancel screen was also erected as a memorial to James in St Mary's Church, Panteg, with the unveiling in 1935 being carried out by Lord Trevethin, a friend of James since childhood. Rugby School erected the James Pavilion in his memory, which was opened in 1937 with Sir Pelham Warner, an Old Rugbeian, paying tribute to James's love of cricket.

Church of England titles
Preceded by Richard Bonnor	Dean of St Asaph; 1886–1889	Succeeded by John Owen
Academic offices
Preceded by John Percival	Head Master of Rugby School; 1895–1910	Succeeded by Albert David
Preceded by James Bellamy	President of St John's College, Oxford; 1909–1931	Succeeded by Frederick William Hall
