= Marlowe Elementary School =

- Marlowe Consolidated School
- U.S. National Register of Historic Places
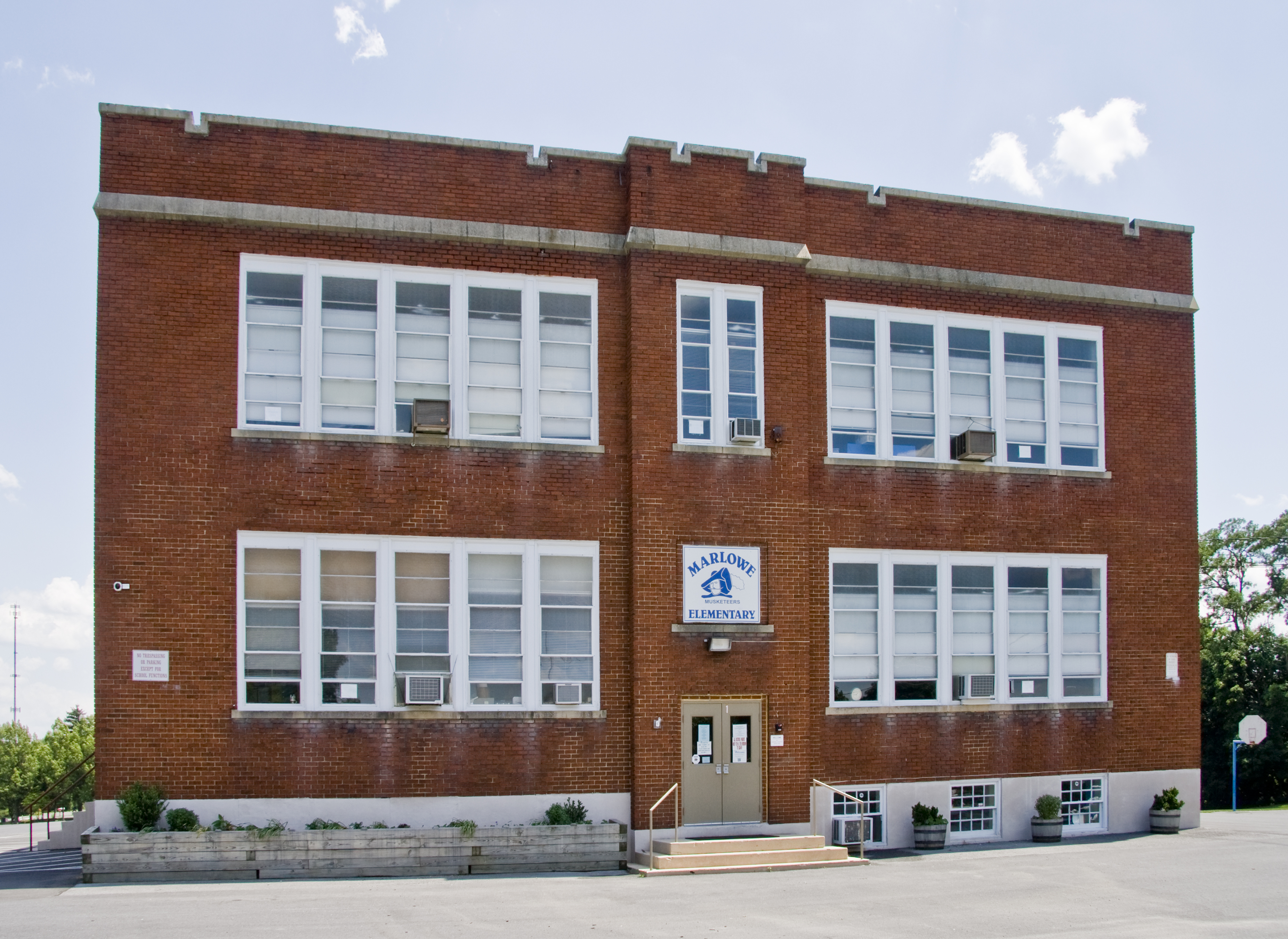
- Marlowe Elementary School in 2009

- Location within West Virginia Location within the United States
- Location: 9580 Williamsport Pike, Falling Waters, West Virginia
- Coordinates: 39°35′14″N 77°51′36″W
- Built: 1922
- Architect: Drake, George
- Architectural style: Gothic
- NRHP reference No.: 06000169
- Added to NRHP: March 22, 2006

Marlowe Elementary School was built in 1922 as an eight-room school to serve grades 1 through 8 in Marlowe, West Virginia. The new school allowed a number of one-room schools in the area to be closed.

The Marlowe School is a two-story brick building on a concrete base. As originally built there were four rooms on each of the two main levels, with a cafeteria and mechanical rooms in the basement. Each classroom was provided with a coatroom. Windows were concentrated on the front and rear of the building with sparsely fenestrated ends. A central stairway serves all levels. The classrooms retain their original wood wainscoting and much of their original character. One story additions have been added to the rear from the 1970s on. The building presently serves grades K through 2 as a primary school.

The school was listed on the National Register of Historic Places in 2006 as the Marlowe Consolidated School.
