= William Eley (academic) =

English priest and academic

William Eley, D.D. was an English priest and academic.

A graduate of Brasenose College, Oxford, he was the second President of St John's College, Oxford. He held the living at Crick, Northamptonshire and died in prison at Hereford in 1609.
