= Francis Cheynell =

English religious controversialist

Francis Cheynell (1608–1665) was a prominent English religious controversialist, of Presbyterian views, and President of St John's College, Oxford 1648 to 1650, imposed by the Parliamentary regime.

His Aulicus of 1644 is accounted the first work of speculative fiction to be set in a hypothetical future, in this case the return of Charles I of England.

== Life ==
He became a fellow of Merton College, Oxford, in 1629, and took an M.A. in 1633. He was a vicar in Hertfordshire and then at Marston St Lawrence, Northamptonshire from 1637; he lost his position in Oxford, as an opponent of William Laud, in 1638. Pushed out by Royalist forces, he became a chaplain to the New Model Army, and a member of the Westminster Assembly.

He became Rector of Petworth, Sussex, imposed by Parliament in 1643, in place of Henry King, the bishop of Chichester, and ‘in practice though not in name bishop of the diocese,’ until the Restoration.

He acted as Visitor to the University of Oxford, from 1647. He was also Lady Margaret Professor of Divinity at Oxford University until deposed at the Restoration.

== Heresy hunter ==
He has been characterized as ‘One of the foremost heresiographers of the 1640s’. He attacked, under the name of Socinianism, early non-Trinitarian thinkers, tending to Unitarianism. He was very much an alarmist in tone, and at times perhaps afflicted by mental illness.

He assailed Lucius Cary, 2nd Viscount Falkland, his failed convert William Chillingworth, Henry Hammond, John Webberley, William Erbery, Gilbert Sheldon, Jasper Mayne, John Bidle and John Fry.

== Works ==
- Sions Memento and Gods Alarum (1643)
- The Rise, Growth, and Danger of Socinianisme (1643)
- Aulicus his Dream, of the King's Sudden Coming to London (1644)
- Chillingworthi Novissima (1644)
- The Man of Honor described. Sermon to the House of Lords, 1645
- Truth triumphing over errour and heresie. Or, A relation of a publike disputation at Oxford in S. Maries Church on Munday last, Jan. 11. 1646: between Master Cheynell, a member of the Assembly and Master Erbury, the Seeker and Socinian (1646)
- An account given to the Parliament by the ministers sent by them to Oxford (1647)
- The sworne confederacy between the convocation at Oxford, and the tower of London (1647)
- The Divine Trinunity of the Father, Son, and Holy Spirit (1650)
- A Plot for the good of Posterity.
- Divers Letters to Dr. Jasp. Mayne, concerning false Prophets.
- A copy of some Letters which passed at Oxford between him and Dr. Hammond
- A Discussion of Mr. Fry's Tenets lately condemned in Parliament, and Socinianism proved to be an Unchristian Doctrine.

== Notes ==
Academic offices
Preceded by Richard Baylie	President of St John's College, Oxford; 1648-1650	Succeeded by Unknown
