= William Hayes (academic) =

Irish-born physicist and academic administrator (1930–2025)

William Hayes (12 November 1930 – 16 March 2025) was an Irish-born physicist and academic administrator, active in the United Kingdom.

== Early life and career ==
Hayes was born in Killorglin on 12 November 1930. He was educated at Synge Street CBS; University College, Dublin; and the University of Oxford. Hayes came to St John's College, Oxford as an Overseas Scholar in 1955. At St John's, he was Fellow and Tutor from 1960 to 1987; and Principal Bursar from 1977 to 1987. Hayes was a University Lecturer from 1962 to 1985, and Professor from 1985 to 1987. Hayes was President of St John's College, Oxford from 1987 to 2001. He was Pro-Vice-Chancellor of the University of Oxford from 1990 to 2001.

Hayes specialised in crystals, and studied imperfections in crystals and defects in solids. He investigated the spectroscopic signatures of imperfections in alkali halides and semiconductors, using varied research techniques that included inelastic light scattering (Raman and Brillouin spectroscopy), magneto-optics (Zeeman effect), nuclear magnetic resonance (NMR), electron paramagnetic resonance (EPR) and muon spin resonance (mu-SR).

== Personal life and death ==
Hayes married Joan Ferris in 1962. Their marriage produced three children, and lasted until her death in 1996.

Hayes died on 16 March 2025, at the age of 94.

== Works ==
His publications included the books:

- Scattering of Light by Crystals (co-written with Rodney Loudon)
- Defects and Defect Processes in Nonmetallic Solids (co-written with A.M. Stoneham)

== Awards ==
In 1990 he was elected a Fellow of the American Physical Society for "creative applications of spectroscopy and laser techniques to the understanding of defects in solids. phase transitions, and semi-conductor physics"

Academic offices
Preceded by John Kendrew	President of St John's College, Oxford; 1987–2001	Succeeded by Michael Scholar
