= William Salkeld (legal writer) =

William Salkeld (1671–1715), legal writer, was the son of Samuel Salkeld of Fallowden, Northumberland, who died in 1699, and came of an ancient Cumberland family. He matriculated at St. Edmund Hall, Oxford, on 22 April 1687, at the age of fifteen. He entered himself as a student of the Middle Temple, 2 May 1692, and was called to the bar on 3 June 1698.

He settled in Dorset on his marriage, in 1700, with Mary, only daughter and heiress of John Ryves of Fifehide Nevill in that county. He acquired a portion of that manor, disposing in 1707 of his paternal estate of Fallowden. Having in the meanwhile attained to a fair practice at the bar, Salkeld was in 1713 appointed Chief Justice of the Great Sessions for the counties of Carmarthen, Cardigan, and Pembroke. On 24 Jan. 1715 he became Serjeant-at-Law, and, in spite of the change of dynasty, he presided over the Carmarthen circuit until his death on 14 Sept. following. He was buried in the church of Fifehide Nevill, where a monument was erected to his memory. His widow died in 1723, aged 42, leaving three sons and three daughters.

Serjeant Salkeld is best remembered as a diligent and painstaking law reporter, his Reports of Cases in the King's Bench, 1689–1712, published posthumously in 1717 and 1718, being the standing authority for that period. With others he translated into English the Reports of Sir Creswell Levinz in the King's Bench, 1660–1697, which appeared in 1722.
