= Thankful Owen =

English academic

Thankful Owen (1620–1681) was an English academic in the mid-17th century.

Owen was born in London and educated at Exeter College, Oxford. He was a fellow at Lincoln College, Oxford, from 1642 to 1650; and president of St John's College, Oxford, from 1650 to 1660. He died on 1 April (Good Friday) 1681 and was buried in Bunhill Fields.
