= Michael Marlow (priest) =

Michael Marlow (died 1828) was an academic administrator at the University of Oxford and an Anglican priest.

Michael Marlow was the only son of Rev. Michael Marlow and his wife Sarah. He was educated at Merchant Taylors' School, from where he gained a scholarship to St John's College, Oxford.

Marlow subsequently became a Fellow of St John's College. In 1795, after gaining his Doctor of Divinity, he was elected President of the College. While President at St John's College, Marlow was also Vice-Chancellor of Oxford University from 1798 until 1802.

Marlow was also Rector at the village of Hanborough in Oxfordshire, near Oxford. He was married but did not have any children.

Academic offices
Preceded by Samuel Dennis	President of St John's College, Oxford; 1795–1828	Succeeded by Philip Wynter
Preceded by Edmund Isham	Vice-Chancellor of Oxford University; 1798–1802	Succeeded by Whittington Landon
