= Peter Mews =

Theologian and bishop

The Right Reverend Peter Mews
- Bishop of Winchester
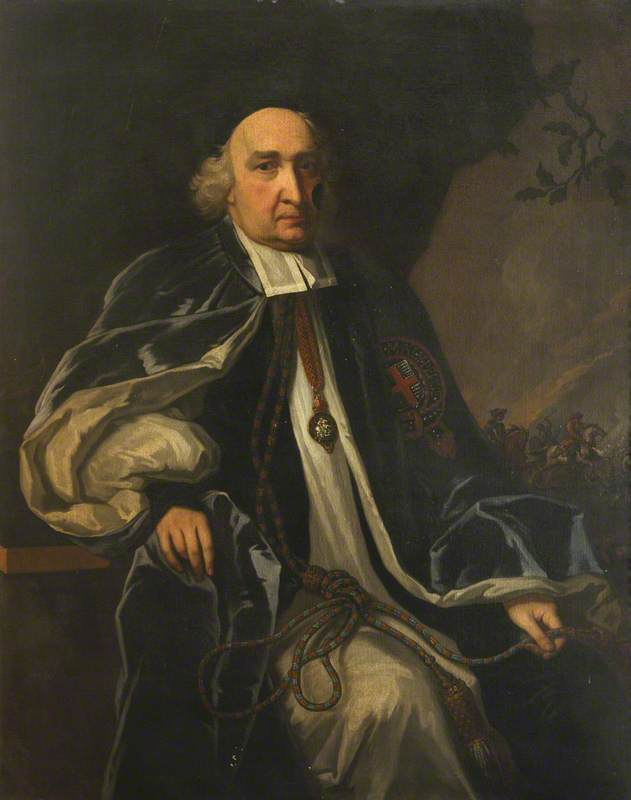
- Portrait by Michael Dahl
- Church: Church of England
- Diocese: Winchester
- Elected: 1684
- Term ended: 1706
- Predecessor: George Morley
- Successor: Jonathan Trelawny
- Previous posts: Archdeacon of Huntingdon (1649–1666) canon of Windsor (1662–1673); Archdeacon of Berkshire (1665–1673); President of St John's College, Oxford (5 August 1667 – 1673); Vice-Chancellor of Oxford University (1669–1673); Dean of Rochester (1670–1673); Bishop of Bath and Wells (19 December 1672 {elected

Orders
- Consecration: 9 February 1673 by Gilbert Sheldon

Personal details
- Born: 25 March 1619 Caundle Purse, Dorset, England
- Died: 9 November 1706 (aged 87) Farnham Castle, Surrey, England
- Buried: Winchester Cathedral
- Denomination: Anglican
- Residence: Farnham Castle (as Bishop of Winchester)
- Parents: Elisha Mews & Elizabeth Winniffe
- Spouse: Mary Baylie
- Profession: academic theologian; former Royalist army officer
- Education: St John's College, Oxford

Ordination history of Peter Mews
History
Diaconal ordination
- Ordained by: Robert Skinner (Oxford)
- Date: 14 January 1645
- Place: Chapel, Trinity College, Oxford
Priestly ordination
- Date: c. 1646
Episcopal consecration
- Principal consecrator: Gilbert Sheldon
- Co-consecrators: Humphrey Henchman; John Dolben; Anthony Sparrow; Isaac Barrow; Peter Gunning; Nathaniel Crew; John Pritchett
- Date: 9 February 1673

Peter Mews (25 March 1619 – 9 November 1706) was an English Royalist theologian and bishop. He was a captain captured at Naseby and he later had discussions in Scotland for the Royalist cause. Later made a bishop he would report on non-conformist families.

== Life ==
Mews was born at Caundle Purse in Dorset, and was educated at the Merchant Taylors' School, London, and at St John's College, Oxford, of which he was scholar and fellow.

When the Civil War broke out in 1642, Mews joined the Royalist army, and, having been made a captain, was taken prisoner at Naseby; but he was soon released and in 1648 sought refuge in Holland. He became friendly with King Charles I's secretary, Sir Edward Nicholas, and being skilful at disguising himself was very useful to the Royalists during the rule of Oliver Cromwell, undertaking two journeys to Scotland in 1653. In August of that year, his friend Nicholas applied to Mary, Princess Royal and Princess of Orange, to use her influence to get Mews a post as reader in philosophy at the Orange College of Breda, but had a reply from Hyde that the place called for a man "that hath not bene a truant from his bookes".

Before this Mews had been ordained. Taking the degree of DCL and regaining his fellowship at Oxford after the Restoration, he became Archdeacon of Huntingdon, vicar of St Mary's, Reading, and chaplain to the King; then, having obtained two other livings, he was made canon of Windsor, canon of St David's, and Archdeacon of Berkshire (1665–1672).

In 1667, when at Breda arranging peace between England and the Dutch Republic, he was chosen President of St John's College, Oxford, in succession to his father-in-law, Richard Baylie, afterwards becoming Vice-Chancellor of the University of Oxford and dean of Rochester. He was appointed Bishop of Bath and Wells in 1672. He used his position to report on well-to-do non-conformist families. He gave Mary Speke and her family particular attention.

Mews resigned his presidency at Oxford University in 1673, and in 1684 he was elected Bishop of Winchester, a position which this "old, honest cavalier," as Thomas Hearne calls him, filled until his death. The bishop is buried in Winchester Cathedral.

Mews lent his carriage horses to pull the cannon at a critical moment during the Battle of Sedgemoor, where he was wounded whilst accompanying the royal army. He was, however, in sympathy with the Seven Bishops, and was only prevented by illness from attending their meeting; and as visitor of Magdalen College, Oxford, he supported the fellows in their resistance to James II, admitted their nominee, John Hough, to the presidency, and restored the ejected fellows in October 1688.

He took the oaths to William III and Mary II in 1689. In the absence of Henry Compton, Bishop of London, Mews took the chief part at the consecration of John Tillotson as Archbishop of Canterbury in 1691.

A portrait is displayed in the Great Hall of the 15th-century manor house, Athelhampton Hall, known as Athelhampton House, just a few miles outside Dorchester in Dorset. His portrait also hangs in the Long Gallery of the Bishop's Palace in Wells and there is another in the hall of Dunster Castle in Somerset.

== Sources ==
- "Mews, Peter". Oxford Dictionary of National Biography (online ed.). Oxford University Press. doi:10.1093/ref:odnb/18633. (Subscription, Wikipedia Library access or UK public library membership required.)
- "Mews, Peter (1645–1699)". The Clergy of the Church of England Database 1540–1835. CCEd Person ID 7205.

Academic offices
Preceded by Richard Baylie	President of St John's College, Oxford; 1667–1673	Succeeded by William Levinz
Preceded by John Fell	Vice-Chancellor of Oxford University; 1669–1673	Succeeded by Ralph Bathurst
Church of England titles
Preceded by Nathaniel Hardy	Dean of Rochester; 1670–1673	Succeeded by Thomas Lamplugh
Preceded by Robert Creighton	Bishop of Bath and Wells; 1673–1684	Succeeded by Thomas Ken
Preceded by George Morley	Bishop of Winchester; 1684–1706	Succeeded by Jonathan Trelawny
