= Christopher Nicole =

British writer

Christopher Robin Nicole
- Born: Christopher Robin Nicole; 7 December 1930; Georgetown, British Guiana (now Guyana)
- Died: 2 September 2017 (aged 86); Guernsey, Channel Islands
- Education: Queen's College, Guyana, Harrison College (Barbados)
- Occupation: novelist
- Spouse(s): Jean Regina Amelia Barnett (1951–?; divorced); Diana Bachmann (1982–his death)
- Children: 5
- Writing career
- Pen name: Peter Grange, Andrew York, Robin Cade, Mark Logan, Christina Nicholson, Alison York, Leslie Arlen, Robin Nicholson, C.R. Nicholson, Daniel Adams, Simon McKay, Caroline Gray, Alan Savage, Nicholas Grant, Max Marlow (with Diana Bachmann)
- Language: English
- Period: 1957–2017
- Genres: historical, war, spy, romance

Christopher Robin Nicole (7 December 1930 – 2 September 2017) was a prolific British writer of over 200 novels and non-fiction books since 1957. He wrote as Christopher Nicole and also under several pseudonyms including Peter Grange, Andrew York, Robin Cade, Mark Logan, Christina Nicholson, Alison York, Leslie Arlen, Robin Nicholson, C.R. Nicholson, Daniel Adams, Simon McKay, Caroline Gray and Alan Savage. He also wrote under the pen name Max Marlow when co-authoring with his wife, fellow author Diana Bachmann.

== Biography ==
=== Personal life ===
Christopher Robin Nicole was born on 7 December 1930 in Georgetown, in British Guiana (now Guyana), where he was raised. He was the son of Jean Dorothy (Logan) and Jack Nicole, a police officer. Both his parents were Scottish. He studied at Queen's College in Guyana and at Harrison College in Barbados. He was a fellow at the Canadian Bankers Association and a clerk for the Royal Bank of Canada in Georgetown and Nassau from 1947 to 1956. In 1957, he moved to Guernsey, Channel Islands, where lived until his death, but he also had a domicile in Spain.

On 31 March 1951, Nicole married his first wife, Jean Regina Amelia Barnett, with whom he had two sons, Bruce and Jack, and two daughters, Julie and Ursula, before they divorced. On 8 May 1982 Nicole married for the second time with fellow writer Diana Bachmann.

=== Writing career ===
Nicole was first published in 1957, when he wrote a book about West Indian Cricket. He published his first novel in 1959, his first stories being set in his native Caribbean. Later he wrote many historical novels, set in tumultuous periods such as World War I, World War II and the Cold War, and depicting places in Europe, Asia and Africa. He also wrote classic romance novels.

He signed most of his books as Christopher Nicole, but also used several pseudonyms, some of them female. Pseudonyms used include: Peter Grange, Andrew York, Robin Cade, Mark Logan, Christina Nicholson, Alison York, Leslie Arlen, Robin Nicholson, C.R. Nicholson, Daniel Adams, Simon McKay, Caroline Gray, Alan Savage and Nicholas Grant. He wrote disaster thrillers in collaboration with his wife, Diana Bachmann, under the pen name Max Marlow. Under his different pseudonyms he has worked with many publishing houses: Jarrolds, Hutchinson, Simon & Schuster, Coward-McCann & Geoghegan, Jove, Michael Joseph, Mills & Boon, and Severn House.

He specialized in series and sagas, and continued to write in the 21st century.
