= Thomas Fry (priest, born 1718) =

Thomas Fry, D.D. (1718–1772) was an English priest and academic. He was president of St John's College, Oxford, from 1757.

Fry was born in Bristol and entered St John's in 1730. He graduated BA in 1736, and MA in 1740. He was ordained in 1744. At St John's he was logic reader from 1737 to 1740; dean of arts from 1740 to 1744; natural philosophy reader from 1745 to 1746; college preacher from 1746 to 1747; bursar from 1748 to 1749; dean of divinity from 1750 to 1754; and vice-president from 1755 to 1757.

He died intestate in Bristol on 22 November 1772. He was buried in the churchyard at Clifton.
