= Diana Bachmann =

British novelist

Diana Mary Bachmann Nicole
- Born: Diana Mary Bachmann
- Occupation: novelist
- Spouse: Christopher Nicole (m. 1982)
- Writing career
- Pen name: Diana Bachmann, Max Marlow (with Christopher Nicole)
- Language: English
- Period: 1985-Present
- Genres: historical, war, thriller, romance

Diana Bachmann is a British writer of 6 historical novels from 1985 to 1998. She also wrote 11 thriller novels under the pen name Max Marlow in collaboration with her husband, prolific writer Christopher Nicole (1930-2017). They lived in Guernsey, Channel Islands

== Bibliography ==
=== Single novels ===
- Beyond the Sunset (1985)
- Janthina (1987)
- Tides of the Heart (1987)

=== Guernsey Saga ===
1. A Sound Like Thunder (1996)
2. An Elusive Freedom (1997)
3. Winds of Change (1998)

=== As Max Marlow ===
==== Novels ====
- Her Name Will Be Faith (1988)
- The Red Death (1990)
- Meltdown (1991)
- Arctic Peril (1993)
- Growth (1993)
- Where the River Rises (1994)
- Shadow at Evening (1994)
- The Burning Rocks (1995)
- Hell's Children (1996)
- Dry (1997)
- The Trench (1998)

== References and sources ==
1. Diana Bachmann at Fantastic Fiction
2. Max Marlow at Fantastic Fiction
