= Max Marlow =

Christopher Nicole & Diana Bachmann
- Occupation: Novelist
- Writing career
- Pen name: Max Marlow
- Language: English
- Period: 1988–1998
- Genre: Thriller

Max Marlow is the pen name of married British writing team Christopher Nicole and Diana Bachmann. They wrote 11 thriller novels from 1988 to 1998. They live in Guernsey, Channel Islands.

== Bibliography ==
=== Novels ===
- Her Name Will Be Faith (1988)
- The Red Death (1990)
- Meltdown (1991)
- Arctic Peril (1993)
- Growth (1993)
- Where the River Rises (1994)
- Shadow at Evening (1994)
- The Burning Rocks (1995)
- Hell's Children (1996)
- Dry (1997)
- The Trench (1998)

== References and sources ==
Max Marlow at Fantastic Fiction
