= Kendrew (surname) =

Kendrew is a surname. Notable people with the surname include:

- Douglas Kendrew (1910–1989), British Army officer, rugby player and politician
- John Kendrew (1917–1997), English biochemist, crystallographer, and science administrator
- John Kendrew (inventor) (1748–1800), British inventor
- Norman Kendrew (1908–1966), British cricketer
- Peter Kendrew (born 1940), British competition swimmer
- Wilfrid George Kendrew (1884–1962), British climatologist

== See also ==
- Kendrew Lascelles, South African actor
