= Tempestarii =

Weather-making magicians in medieval lore

In medieval lore, Tempestarii (or Tempestarius (singular)) were weather-making magicians who dwelt among the common people and possessed the power to raise or prevent storms at will. For this reason, anyone reputed as a weather-maker was the subject of respect, fear, and hatred in rural areas.

== Agobard of Lyon ==
Perhaps the best known work on tempestarii was an 815 AD piece called "On Hail and Thunder" by a bishop, Agobard of Lyon.

Some describe it as a complaint of the irreligious beliefs of his flock, as villagers resented paying tithes to the church, but freely paid a form of insurance against storms to village tempestarii; but, it was also noted, whenever a supposed weathermaker failed to prevent a storm, he or she would generally suffer the wrath of the populace, being victimised or killed.

A closer examination of Agobard's writing shows that he actually argued against the existence of weather-witches, but acquiesced that the saints of God are able to cause these things by praying with faith. He is more concerned with his flock's misunderstanding that these "witches" are obtaining power from the devil, and subsequent eagerness to kill or curse anyone able to work miracles. His key argument is that anyone capable of "raising a gale" would be one who has faith in God, a Christian, not a witch, because witches are not able to do such things.

"Perhaps the ones who attribute the making of hail to men would say that Moses reached his staff up to heaven and in this sense the storm was sent by human agency. Certainly Moses, the servant of God, was good and righteous, but these people do not dare to say that the so-called ‘storm-makers’ are good and righteous, but rather evil and unrighteous, deserving of both temporal and eternal condemnation, nor are they servants of God, except perhaps by circumstance rather than willing service. For if there were men who could cause hail, in imitation of Moses, they would surely be servants of God, not servants of the devil; although the passages cited above show that neither servants of God nor those of the devil cause of hail, but only omnipotent God...

Therefore no human assistant should be sought in such events, because none will be found, except perhaps the saints of God, who have brought about, and are yet to bring about, many things. Some of them have the power to close up the heavens, lest it rain on days when they are prophesying, like Elijah; and to change water into blood and torment the earth with every plague as many times as they wish, as Moses and Aaron did to Egypt. Truly no other person sends hail in the summer, other than the one who sends snow in the winter. For there is a single reason for both these occurrences, when clouds are at either time raised higher than usual.

...not like these half-faithful of ours, who, as soon as they hear thunder, or when there is a breath of light wind, say ‘a gale is raised’ and curse, saying, ‘Cursed be the tongue that did these things, and may it be dried up and now be cut off.’ Pray tell, whom are you cursing? A righteous man or a sinner? For a sinner, partly unbelieving like you, cannot raise a gale, as you put it, because he is not able to by his own strength, nor can he command evil angels (nor do evil angels even have power in these matters)."

Agobard of Lyons also referenced a related belief among his parishioners—a belief that tempestarii were in league with a mythical race of cloud-dwellers who came from a land named 'Magonia' ("Land of Magic", "Land of Thieves"). The Magonians were supposed to sail the skies in storm clouds; they would then pay Frankish tempestarii to summon up storms over farmlands, during which the Magonians could swoop down and steal the corn from the fields. On the particular occasion which prompted Agobard to write, several supposed Magonians had been taken prisoner by irate villagers shortly after a bad storm; the Bishop had been forced to intervene and debate with the villagers in order to save the prisoners' lives.

== Storm raising ==
During the witch hunts the belief in witches who could raise storms was not limited to the Tempestarii. Depending on a witch's preference, they were believed to cause tempests, hailstorms, and lightning. Witches struck homes and crops alike, sank ships, killed men and animals, and it was believed they took great delight in the process. Church authorities gave credence to the belief by stating that God permitted the Devil and witches to perform these acts as punishment for the wickedness of the world.

Since ancient times around the world, the ability to control elements—including the raising of storms and causing rain—has been attributed to magicians, shamans, sorcerers, and witches. As early as 700 A.D., the Catholic Church prosecuted sorcerers for causing storms.

The most famous storm believed to be caused by witches was recorded in 1591 during the North Berwick Witch Trials. John Fian and his alleged coven of witches were accused of raising a sea storm to drown James VI and Queen Anne on their way from Denmark. Shakespeare's final play "The Tempest" also contains a magician named Prospero who is capable of causing tempests.

== Remedies against tempestarii ==
The Catholic Church prohibited superstitious remedies against witchcraft such as storm raising because the remedies themselves were of pagan origin. Prayer, sacraments, and the invocation of the name of God were prescribed instead with the belief that a person who had strong faith in God, kept the commandments, and revered the rites of the Church would be immune from storms and tempests raised by malicious witches.

Because many peasants were reluctant to give up their superstitions as being false, the church also sanctioned remedies like the ringing of church bells, believed to drive storm devils away, and placing charms made from flowers consecrated on Palm Sunday in the crop fields. It was believed that if a storm did strike after the charm was placed, the owner's crops would be protected even if the surrounding land and crops were destroyed.

== See also ==
- Solomonari
- Witch-hunt
- Paganism
- Witchcraft
- Weather lore
- Cailleach

== Sources ==
- Flint, Valerie I. J. (1991), The Rise of Magic in Early Medieval Europe, Princeton University Press
