= Journal of Medieval History =

- Discipline: History
- Language: English; French; German
- Edited by: C.M. Woolgar

Publication details
- History: 1975–present
- Publisher: Taylor & Francis (United Kingdom)
- Frequency: Quarterly

Standard abbreviations
- ISO 4: J. Mediev. Hist.

Indexing
- ISSN: 0304-4181
- LCCN: 76646991
- OCLC no.: 243417182

Links
- Journal homepage

The Journal of Medieval History is a major international academic journal devoted to all aspects of the history of Europe in the Middle Ages.

Each issue contains 4 or 5 original articles on European history, including the British Isles, North Africa, and the Middle East, in the time period between the Fall of Rome and the Renaissance.

All articles are peer-reviewed by at least two referees. The journal's editorial board includes academics from multiple countries.

== See also ==
- The Medieval New: Ambivalence in an Age of Innovation by Patricia Clare Ingham
