= The Medieval New =

2015 monograph by P. Ingham

The Medieval New: Ambivalence in an Age of Innovation
- 2015 book jacket
- Author: Patricia Clare Ingham
- Language: English
- Subject: Medieval civilization - Literary, artistic, technological Creation - Ethics - History and criticism
- Genre: Nonfiction
- Published: 2015
- Publisher: , Penn Press-
- Publication place: Philadelphia
- Media type: Print, E-book
- Pages: 230
- ISBN: 9780812247060
- OCLC: 893455617
- Website: Official website

The Medieval New: Ambivalence in an Age of Innovation is a monograph discussing the medieval relationship to innovative ideas or technology. People of this era could accept the new when it was presented. But they also realized the need for maintaining tradition as an anchor. The author, Patricia Clare Ingham, challenges the idea that Medievalist thinkers conservatively rejected the new. This book was published in 2015 by University of Pennsylvania Press.

== Synopsis ==
In this book, Ingham looks at historical attitudes toward novelty while she challenges the conventional modern beliefs that medieval society lacked an appreciation for the "new." Ingham, suggests that this incorrect modern perception arises from shifting definitions of what constitutes the old and the new. In other words, the modern conceptualization of innovation today creates a blind spot when we look back at the Middle Ages. In contemporary culture, the concept or word "newness" is largely defined by its opposition to the past. Because our underlying vocabulary has changed, modern observers often fail to recognize medieval ingenuity. To be conceptually "new" in the modern sense, an idea, product, or movement usually must render the old obsolete.

By contrast, the medieval worldview making something "new" frequently meant reviving, reinterpreting, or slightly modifying an older tradition rather than destroying it. Because classical and religious authority carried weight, presenting an idea as entirely unprecedented could be viewed with suspicion as error or fraud. Therefore, genuine novelty was often connected to the language of tradition. Medieval innovation was interconnected with established customs. The new was weighted with cautionary ethical interrogation. Ingham says that during these debates, three categorical distinctions were established. These were:

- Practical ingenuity versus frivolous or superficial cleverness
- Productive wonder that was aimed at knowledge versus aimless or blind curiosity.
- Genuine innovation versus deception, error, or fraud.

== About the book ==
By analyzing diverse sources, the book looks at the ethical ambivalence that medieval thinkers held toward new ideas, objects, and concepts. Hence the book is organized as follows:

Introduction. Newfangled Values

PART I. EX NIHILO

Chapter 1. Scholastic Novelties
Chapter 2. Conjuring Roger Bacon

PART II. INGENIUM

Chapter 3. Ingenious Youth
Chapter 4. Little Nothings

PART III. CURIOSITAS

Chapter 5. Suspect Economies
Chapter 6. Old Worlds and New

Afterword. An Age of Innovation

Notes
Bibliography
Index

== See also ==
- The Myth of Morgan la Fey by Kristina Pérez
- Seeing and Being Seen in the Later Medieval World by Dallas G. Denery, II
- Robert Grosseteste: The Growth of an English Mind in Medieval Europe by R. W. Southern

== Reception ==
According to Mash Raskolnikov, writing for Modern Philology, "... Ingham’s book is such a wonderful gift. It is both timely, in that it implicitly comments upon the crisis of the university, and utterly, delightfully untimely, in its insistence upon learnedness, paradox, nuance, and upon beautiful prose...This book seems to me simply invaluable"
