= Legend of the Rood =

Tales loosely based on the Old Testament

The Legend of the Rood (Latin: De ligno sancte crucis) is a complex of medieval tales loosely derived from the Old Testament.

In its fullest form, the narrative tells of how the dying Adam sends his son Seth back to Paradise to seek an elixir which will render him immortal. This part of the tale is sometimes referred to as "the Quest of Seth for the Oil of Life". The angel guarding the gates of Paradise refuses Seth access, but does give him a seed from the tree from which Adam and Eve had stolen the apple. On his return, Seth finds his father dead, but places this seed under his tongue and then buries him at Golgotha. A tree grows from the seed, which is cut down. The wood experiences many adventures, reappearing as a motif in popular renderings of many Old Testament stories. At one point it is a bridge over which the Queen of Sheba passes. Ultimately, it is made into the cross (Middle English: rood) on which Jesus is crucified.

The Legend of the Rood is a key component in the complex of motifs known as the Medieval popular Bible. It is found in many medieval Adam Books, and provides the central framework of works such as the Welsh Ystorya Adaf.

These narratives have been extensively studied by Beryl Smalley, Brian O. Murdoch, Robert Miller and others.

Medieval scholars tend to use the word "legend" solely as a translation of Latin legenda, meaning the biography of saints as a literary form, and hence are often reluctant to use the word too liberally in other contexts. However, as a set-phrase, "Legend of the Rood" has become familiar enough to be uncontroversial.

== Texts ==
- Dream of the Rood, Old English poem
- Tale of the Cross Tree, Slavonic legendary compilation

== Literature ==
- Baring-Gould, Sabine (1868). Curious Myths of the Middle Ages. Vol. 2. London, Oxford and Cambridge: Rivingtons. p. 114.
- Butler, Pierce (1899). Legenda aurea =Légende dorée = Golden legend : a study of Caxton's Golden legend with special reference to its relations to the earlier English prose translation. Baltimore: John Murphy Company.
- de Varagine, Jacobus; Caxton, William (1931). Ellis, Frederick Startridge (ed.). The Golden Legend or Lives of the Saints as englished by William Caxton. Vol. 1. London: J. M. Dent and Sons. p. 180.
- Robert Miller, German and Dutch versions of the legend of the wood of the Cross before Christ, diss Oxford 1992.
- Napier, Arthur Sampson (1894). History of the Holy Rood-tree: A Twelfth Century Version of the Cross Legend. London: For the Early English Text Society. p. 1. (Begins with Moses)
- Veldener, Johann (1863). Berjeau, Jean Philibert (ed.). Geschiedenis van het Heylighe Cruys; or, History of the Holy Cross. London: C. J. Stewart. p. 39.
