= Kunsthistorisches Institut in Florenz =

Research institute in Florence, Italy

Coordinates: 43.7772°N 11.2640°E

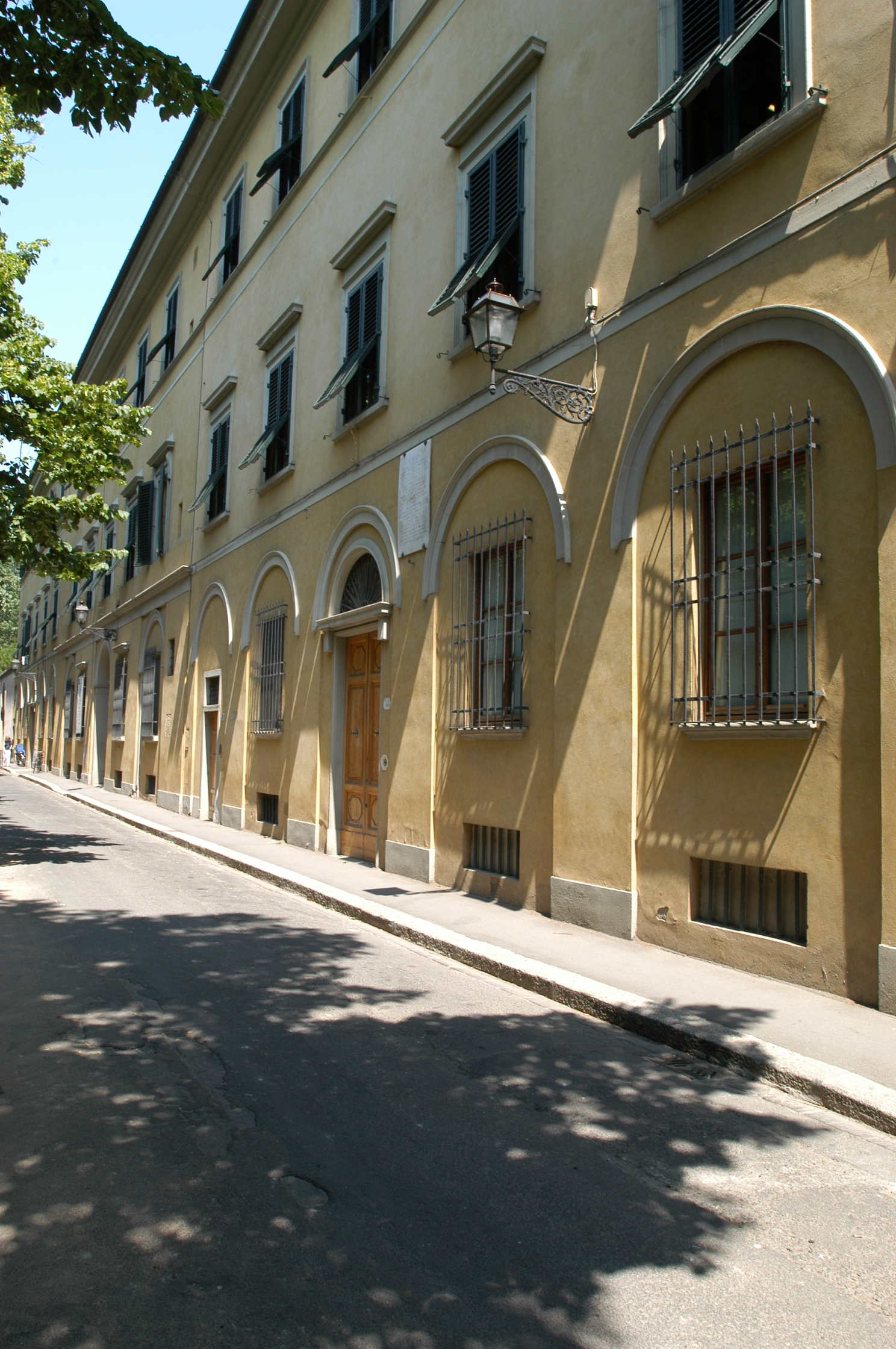
Kunsthistorisches Institut in Florenz

The Kunsthistorisches Institut in Florenz (KHI) is one of the oldest research institutions dedicated to the history of art and architecture in Italy, where facets of European, Mediterranean and global history are investigated.

Founded in 1897 by a group of independent scholars, it has been under the auspices of the Max Planck Society since 2002, and is one of the few institutes of the Max Planck Society situated outside Germany. Approximately seventy scholars are currently employed at the institute, which is run by two directors, and the promotion of international young academics is high on its internal agenda. In addition to numerous individual research projects, those funded by third parties and numerous collaborations with international universities, museums and research institutes, Kunsthistorisches Institut in Florenz provides a platform for larger long and medium term projects whose subject matter ranges from Late Antiquity to the Modern Age.

The institute's resources, including the library with over 360,000 volumes, some of which are extremely rare, over 1,070 ongoing journal subscriptions, and one of the most wide-ranging photographic libraries on Italian art, are available to researchers from all over the world, including part of the collection of Evelyn Sandberg-Vavalà. The institute also offers a programme of public academic events.

== History of the institute ==
The idea of creating an art historical research institute in Florence was first discussed within a circle of academics, connoisseurs and artists gathered around the collector Baron Karl Eduard von Liphart. In the winter semester of 1888/89, August Schmarsow, professor of art history at Breslau, taught courses at various locations in Florence. Schmarsow is considered by many to be the prime initiator of the Kunsthistorisches Institut in Florenz.

== Library ==
The library's books were removed by the Germans during World War II. After the war, many of the major collections looted from Italy were identified by the Monuments, Fine Arts and Archives service of the American military government and returned to their owners. The Collegio Rabbinico Italiano, the Kunsthistorisches Institut in Florenz, and the Deutsche Historische Bibliothek Rom were all returned, although not all were intact, to their owners in Italy. "These last two collections were seized by Hitler with the idea of re-establishing them in Germany."

There is a photograph in the National Archives and Records Administration showing the unloading of some of these re-captured books. The caption reads: "The Kunsthistorisches Institut in Florenz, Library, is being unloaded at the Offenbach Archival Depot 9 July 1945. Three freight cars, 578 cases of books and catalogs of paintings, were brought from the Heilbronn salt mine in Württemberg-Baden where they were kept since brought from Italy."
