= Paul M. Wassarman =

American Developmental Biologist

Paul Michael Wassarman (born March 26, 1940) is an American biologist who has been a professor in the Dept. of Cell, Developmental, and Regenerative Biology at the Icahn School of Medicine at Mount Sinai since 1996 (chairman 2000-2007). His laboratory identified and characterised proteins that make up the zona pellucida (ZP) of mammalian eggs and determined their role in fertilisation.

== Education ==
He earned his B.S. and M.S. from the University of Massachusetts, a Ph.D. in biochemistry from Brandeis University (1963–1967; Advisor, N.O.Kaplan), and was a postdoctoral fellow at the MRC Laboratory of Molecular Biology, Cambridge, England (1967–1970; sponsor, J.C.Kendrew).

== Career ==
He was a faculty member in the Dept. of Biological Chemistry at Harvard Medical School (1972–1986) and in the Dept. of Cell and Developmental Biology at the Roche Institute of Molecular Biology (1986–1996; chairman 1987-1992) before joining the Icahn School of Medicine at Mount Sinai.

== Academic work ==
His main research contributions lie in the areas of mammalian oogenesis and fertilization, particularly on the structure and function of the egg's ZP. His laboratory identified and characterised proteins that make up the ZP, identified growing oocytes as the site of synthesis of ZP proteins, demonstrated that two ZP proteins serve as sperm receptors during fertilization and are inactive following fertilization, identified regions of ZP polypeptides involved in ZP protein secretion and assembly, and proposed a structure for fibrils that constitute the ZP

He edited six volumes of Methods in Enzymology and five volumes of Current Topics in Developmental Biology, was series editor of Advances in Developmental Biology/Biochemistry, has been series editor of Current Topics in Developmental Biology since 2007, and authored "A Guide to Zona Pellucida Domain Proteins" (Wiley, 2015) and "A Place in History: the Biography of John C. Kendrew" (Oxford University Press, 2020).

== Awards and honors ==
He was an NIH predoctoral fellow, Helen Hay Whitney Foundation postdoctoral fellow, Rockefeller Foundation special research fellow, and Lillian and Henry M. Stratton Professorial Chair. He has been an advisor to NIH, NSF, ERC, NSC, WHO, Wellcome Trust, Schering AG, and Hoffmann-La Roche and delivered the Helen Mangelsdorph, M.C. Chang, James E. Leatham, Ernst Schering, Alan S. Parkes, and Luigi Mastroianni memorial lectures.
