= Master of the Franciscan Crucifixes =

Italian painter

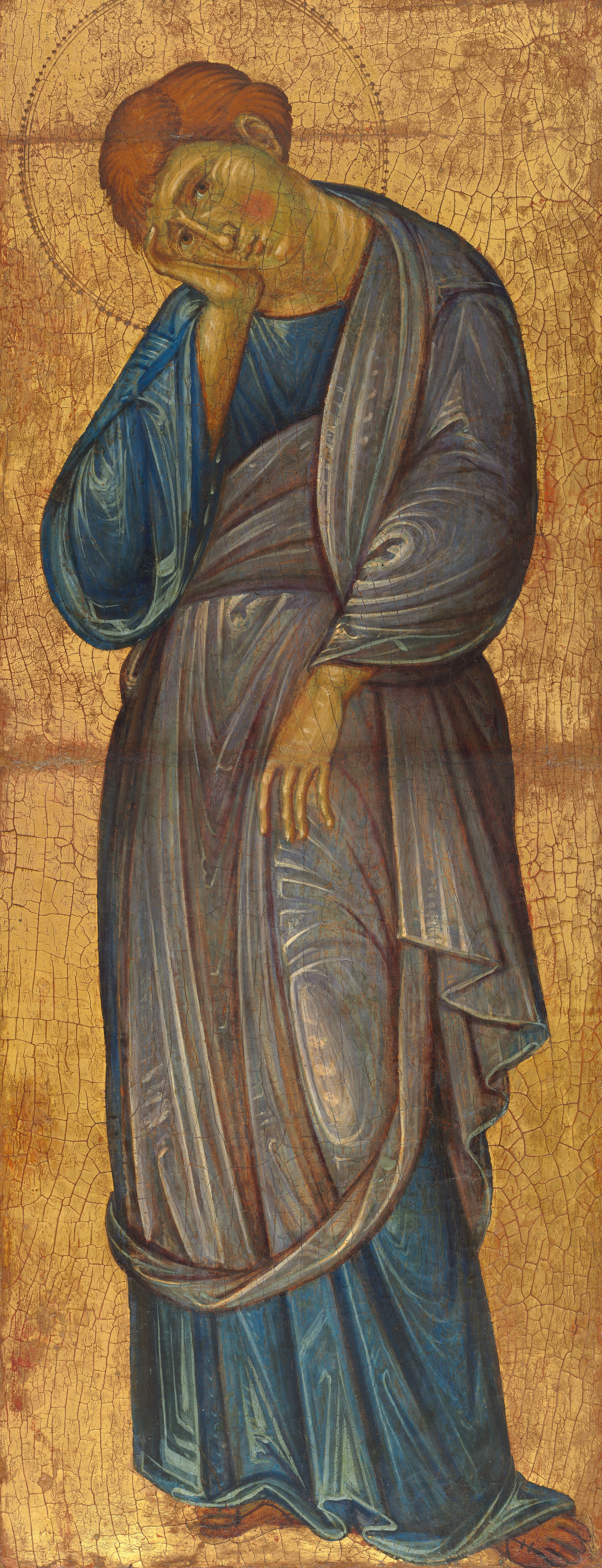
The Mourning Saint John the Evangelist, c. 1272/75

The Master of the Franciscan Crucifixes is the notname given to an Italian painter active in the 1260s and 1270s. The notname is based on a painted crucifix now in the Basilica of San Francesco d'Assisi, which was found to be connected stylistically with two painted crucifixes in Bologna and fragments of two paintings in the National Gallery of Art in Washington, D.C. The artist is presumed to have been Umbrian by origin and training.

== Identification of the artist and his work ==
In 1922, the Swedish art historian Osvald Sirén coined the name for the painter, presumably Umbrian, by attributing common authorship of a painted crucifix now in the Treasury of the Basilica of San Francesco in Assisi, two paintings of the same subject in Bologna, and the fragments The Mourning Madonna and The Mourning Saint John now at the National Gallery of Art in Washington DC.

In 1929, Evelyn Sandberg-Vavalà attributed to the same artist the crucifix in the church of Santa Maria in Borgo in Bologna (now at the Pinacoteca Nazionale of Bologna) as well as three painted crucifixes in the Fornari collection at Fabriano, the Pinacoteca of Faenza and the Museo Civico (now Collezioni Comunali d’Arte) in Bologna. Further works have been attributed to the artist but there is no unanimity among art historians about certain attributions.

== Life ==
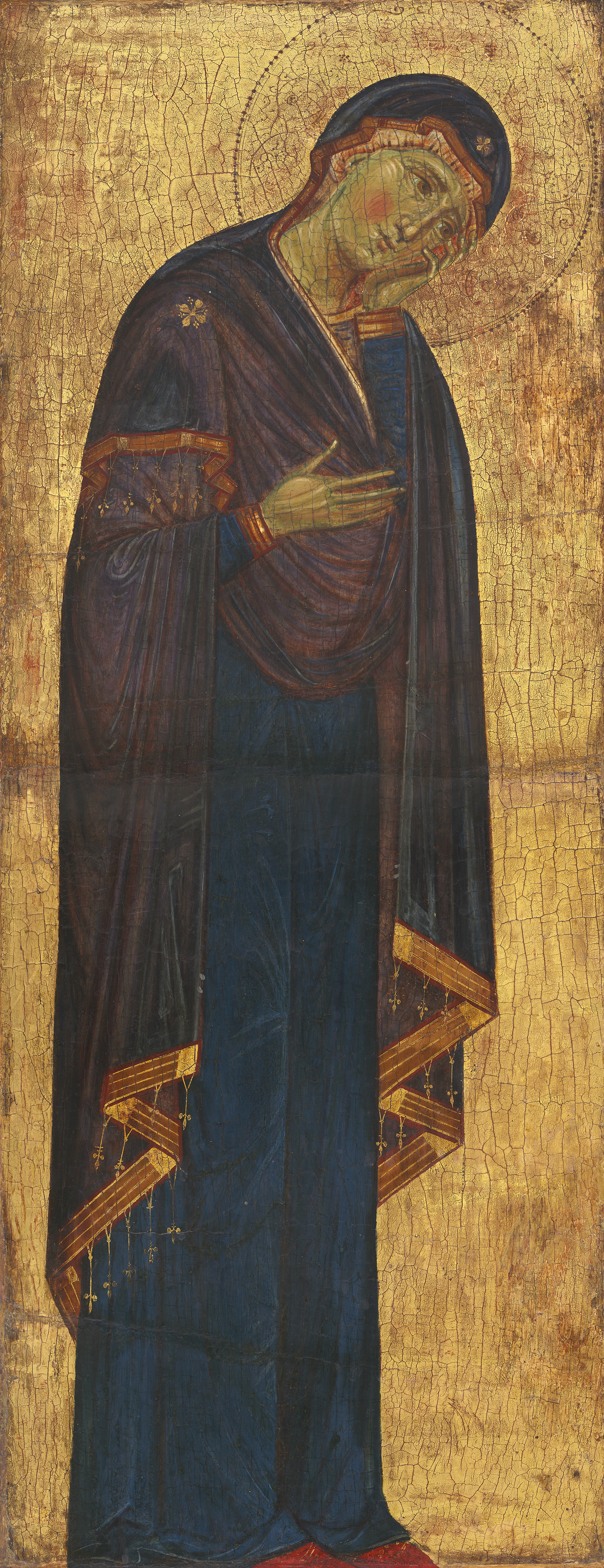
The Mourning Madonna c. 1272/75

The anonymous painter probably trained in Assisi around 1255 – 1265, where he was likely influenced by the Master of Santa Chiara and the Master of Saint Francis who painted frescoes in the nave of the lower church of San Francesco. Other influences by local artists have also been postulated.

The Master of the Franciscan Crucifixes appears to have worked almost exclusively for Franciscan churches and may have been a Franciscan friar. He was also active in the Marches and Emilia-Romagna area. He finally settled in Bologna, where he is known to have executed painted crucifixes but also a fresco in the church of Santo Stefano. His work likely had an influence on local painters and miniaturists.
