= Federico Zeri =

Italian art historian

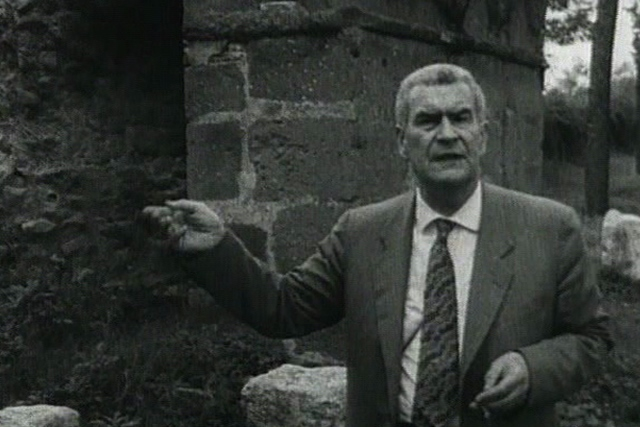
Federico Zeri in 1974

Federico Zeri (12 August 1921 – 5 October 1998) was an Italian art historian specialised in Italian Renaissance painting. He wrote for the Italian newspaper La Stampa, and was a well known television-personality in Italy.

Zeri was born in central Rome, and graduated from Sapienza University of Rome in 1945. Not wishing to enter the academic world, he worked in the Ministry of Public Education until 1952. In 1948 he was nominated director of Galleria Spada in Rome.

Zeri spent academic year 1962-63 at Harvard University as a Fulbright scholar and in 1963 he was among the founding members of the Getty Villa's board of trustees. He left in 1984, after his argument that the Getty kouros was a forgery and should not be bought, was rejected.

Following this episode, Zeri became notorious for denouncing forgeries and misattributions. In 1984, when four students in Livorno hoaxed both the city and Modigliani experts into believing that a group of sculptures they have made were authentic, he was one of the few who called on their amateurish style. Zeri also argued that some of the frescoes in the Basilica of San Francesco d'Assisi, were made by Pietro Cavallini and not Giotto. Zeri's insistence that a painting can be attributed to an artist, by means of a careful examination or connoisseurship, without resort to external evidence such as documents or dates, met controversial responses.

Zeri edited and researched catalogues of the collections of many institutions, including the Frederick Mason Perkins collection in the Sacro Convento in Assisi; Accademia Carrara; Museo Civico Amedeo Lia, La Spezia; Galleria Spada, Rome; The Metropolitan Museum of Art, New York; The Walters Art Museum, Baltimore. and Narodna Galerija in Ljubljana (with Ksenija Rozman).

Zeri died at the age of 77, in his villa in Mentana on 5 October 1998. He bequeathed his estate to the University of Bologna, complete with his library and papers, a collection of about 400 ancient inscriptions and a grand collection of photographs. Most photographs documented artworks from Italy and elsewhere, some done by himself and some acquired from other collections, including part of the collection of Evelyn Sandberg-Vavalà. The collections and accompanying database are managed, partly digitized, by the Federico Zeri Foundation.

All through his life, Zeri maintained close connections with Bernard Berenson, Roberto Longhi, and his teacher Pietro Toesca. He taught art history at the University of Rome, and had visiting positions at Harvard, where he delivered a series of lectures on Lauro De Bosis in 1962, and at the Columbia University in New York.
