= Ystorya Adaf =

- Also known as: Ystorya Addaf, Efengyl Nicodemus
- Language: late Middle Welsh
- Genre: translation of the Latin text Historia Adam

Ystorya Adaf (Ystorya Addaf, The Story of Adam) is the most commonly accepted title of a medieval Welsh translation of the Latin text Historia Adam, a version of the popular "Legend of the Rood" (or De ligno sancte crucis). The Ystorya Adaf should not be confused with Ystorya Adaf ac Eua y wreic (The Story of Adam and his wife Eve), a Welsh translation of an Old Testament Midrash text, Vita Adae (et Evae).

The Ystorya Adaf survives in four manuscripts, Peniarth 5, Peniarth 7, Peniarth 14, and Havod 22, and has been edited three times. The version in Peniarth MS. 5 misleadingly titles the work Euengl Nicodemus (Efengyl Nicodemus, Gospel of Nicodemus). Although the Nicodemus legend and the Rood legend commonly became attached to each other in many medieval permutations, the Welsh text is not one of them. The sequence in which the Ystorya Adaf appears in Peniarth MS 5, where it is followed by the Passion story from the Gospel of Matthew and a Welsh translation of the Inventio Sancte Crucis, suggests that the scribe took the Ystoria to be a prelude to the Crucifixion legend and the Inventio its follow-up story, with the Gospel account providing a link between them.

Though the story is slightly elaborated after the typical manner of Middle Welsh narrative prose, by and large it adheres closely to the Latin text as reconstructed by Meyer. Such few connections as there are between the motifs of the story and native Welsh tradition seem coincidental. For example, the motif of the withered footsteps (Seth finds his way back to Paradise by following the footsteps left by Adam and Eve years before, on which nothing ever grew again), which finds an analogue, but only that, in Triad 20W:

"But one was more of a red-reaper than the three: Arthur was his name. For a year neither grass nor plants would come up where one of the three walked, but for seven years none would come up where Arthur walked."

The Rood legend is also referred to by the 14th-century Welsh poet Gruffudd ap Maredudd.
