= The Myth of Morgan la Fey =

2014 monograph by Kristina Pérez

- Author: Kristina Pérez
- Language: English
- Publisher: Palgrave Macmillan
- Publication date: 2014
- Dewey Decimal: 809.933522
- LC Class: PN686.W65 P48

The Myth of Morgan la Fey is a non-fiction book written by Kristina Pérez and published in 2014 by Palgrave Macmillan as part of their Arthurian and Courtly Cultures book series.

== Synopsis ==
Perez the author, traces the literature surrounding Morgan le Fay ("la Fey") from her roots as a Celtic sovereignty goddess, through medieval literature, the 19th century Pre-Raphaelite artistic movement, and all the way into modern film and popular culture. Pérez systematically investigates aspects of Arthurian legend showing that Morgan can simultaneously be King Arthur's enemy and his savior, i.e., the healer who carries him away to Avalon. Pérez's demonstrates that Western patriarchal culture has historically tried to maintain safe binary categorizations of women as either nurturing mothers, such as the Madonna, or fallen sexual lovers.

According to Perez, Morgan is unsettling because she stands against fracturing her identity. She is simultaneously a kingmaker and death-wielder. Perez also demonstrates the devolution and narrowing of the Morgan legend over a millennium. Because her complex duality has led to masculine anxieties, authors incrementally relieved her of her goddess status over time. Thus, transforming her into an evil witch in medieval texts, and eventually into a one-dimensional supervillain in modern pop culture. Also, Perez relates Morgan to other complex female figures in mythology, such as the Dame du Lac (Lady of the Lake), the water-spirit Mélusine, loathly ladies, Breton fairy mistresses, and Gawain's mother.

== Reception ==
Randy P. Schiff, reviewing the book for the journal Arthuriana, called it an "engaging study of ambivalent female identity in Arthurian romance" and opined it a significant contribution to modern Arthurian criticism. He agreed with Pérez's central thesis, which according to him says that Morgan's changing literary roles are less about the character herself, and more a reflection of whatever medieval societal anxieties regarding female sexuality, motherhood, and power were prevalent at the time of writing.

== See also ==
- The Medieval New: Ambivalence in an Age of Innovation
