= Beryl Smalley =

English historian

Beryl Smalley FBA
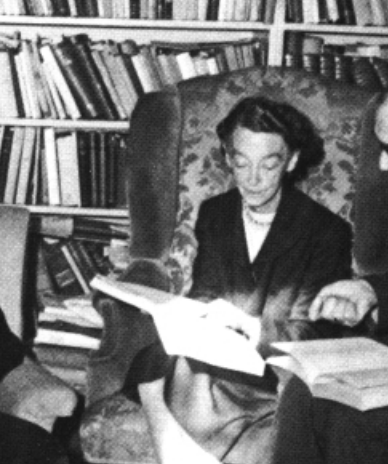
- Born: 3 June 1905; Stockport Etchells, England
- Died: 4 April 1984 (aged 78)

Academic background
- Education: St Hilda's College, Oxford; University of Manchester
- Doctoral advisor: F. M. Powicke

Academic work
- Discipline: History
- Sub-discipline: Medieval history
- Institutions: Royal Holloway College, London; Girton College, Cambridge; St Hilda's College, Oxford
- Notable students: Valerie Flint; Jennifer Loach
- Notable works: The Study of the Bible in the Middle Ages (1941)
- Influenced: Sheila Rowbotham

Beryl Smalley (1905–1984) was an English historian best known for her work The Study of the Bible in the Middle Ages, originally published in 1941, but revised many times, a book that laid the foundations of modern study of the medieval popular Bible.

== Education ==
Beryl Smalley was born on 3 June 1905 in Highfield House, Stockport Etchells, the eldest of six children born to Edgar Smalley, a Manchester businessman, and Constance Lilian Bowman. At 13, Beryl was sent to Cheltenham Ladies College. In 1923, she won a scholarship to St Hilda's College, Oxford. She studied there from 1924 to 1927 as Agnes Ley's pupil. After graduating, she was a research assistant to F. M. Powicke. In 1929, she went to Paris to study and converted to Catholicism. In 1930, she obtained her doctorate from the University of Manchester.

== Career ==
Between 1931 and 1935, Smalley taught at Royal Holloway College, when she left to become a research fellow at Girton College, Cambridge. Later, she was a temporary assistant in Western manuscripts at the Bodleian Library, Oxford, and, in 1944, became tutor in history at St Hilda's College. Smalley remained in that position until 1969, while from 1957 onwards she was also the college's Vice-Principal. One of her more notable pupils was the internationally respected historian on mid-Tudor England, Jennifer Loach, a tutorial fellow at Somerville College, Oxford. Smalley discovered the lost biblical lectures of John Wycliffe, though she had no sympathy for the man himself. According to R. W. Southern, she "could not tolerate his stridency and his putting the Bible above the Church."

Smalley was a member of the Marxist Historians Group until 1956, when most members of the group left. Later she delivered the Ford Lectures on Thomas Becket.

== Honours ==
In 1963, Smalley was elected a Fellow of the British Academy (FBA), the United Kingdom's national academy for the humanities and social sciences. In 1985, a Festschrift was published in her memory, titled Bible in the Medieval World: Essays in Memory of Beryl Smalley, edited by Katherine Walsh and Diana Wood.

== Personal life ==
In a memoir written after her death, fellow medievalist R. W. Southern described Smalley as "an extremely private person" who was nonetheless "a fascinating, daunting, and fastidious personality, both visually and mentally"—a "conspicuous object in the striking elegance and clear-cut severity of her appearance." Undergraduates found her "formidable and mild at the same time. As one put it: 'She inspired in me equal parts of love and terror'". Smalley "was not in the least convivial, but she cared greatly about people in an austere way and would take endless trouble over their minor needs—major ones were their own affair."

Smalley never married, and died in Oxford after a brief illness in 1984. After her surgeon told her she had only a few months to live, she finished as much of her work as possible and destroyed the rest.

"In 1929 she had been received into the Roman Catholic Church, and about ten or twelve years later had become a member of the Communist Party. The connection between these two loyalties remained a mystery to all but herself. But by the time of her death she had quietly dissociated herself from both of them. These were her only attempts to find a home in a universal community. When these failed her, she sought no others, and accepted her solitary fate with unflinching courage and steadfastness. She bequeathed her books to her old College, and directed that there should be 'of course, no memorial service'".

Smalley died on 6 April 1984.

== Selected works ==
- The Study of the Bible in the Middle Ages, 1940 (3rd ed. 1983)
- Historians in the Middle Ages, 1974, Thames and Hudson, ISBN 0-684-14121-3
- The Becket Conflict and the Schools: a Study of Intellectuals in Politics in the Twelfth Century, 1973
- The Gospels in the Schools, c. 1100 – c. 12801985
- Studies in Medieval Thought and Learning from Abelard to Wyclif
- English friars and antiquity in the early fourteenth century, 1960
- Exempla in the commentaries of Stephen Langton, 1933
- Medieval exegesis of wisdom literature : essays by Beryl Smalley; edited by Roland E. Murphy. 1986
- Studies in medieval thought and learning : from Abelard to Wyclif, 1981

Academic offices
Preceded by John H. Plumb	Ford Lecturer; 1966–1967	Succeeded by Robert Blake
