= Magonia =

Mythical cloud realm

Magonia is the name of the cloud realm whence felonious aerial sailors were said to have come, according to commonly held beliefs denounced in the polemical treatise by Carolingian bishop Agobard of Lyon in 815, where he argues against weather magic. The treatise is titled De Grandine et Tonitruis (On Hail and Thunder).

== Description ==
In his treatise Agobard complains that in his region it is widely believed that there is a land called Magonia whose inhabitants travel the clouds in ships and work with Frankish tempestarii ("tempest-raisers" or weather-magi) to steal grain from the fields during (magically raised) storms. He denounces such beliefs as ignorant and refutes them with many quotations from Scripture, to prove that God alone causes hail and thunder.

But we have seen and heard of many people overcome with so much foolishness, made crazy by so much stupidity, that they believe and say that there is a certain region, which is called Magonia, from which ships come in the clouds. In these ships the crops that fell because of hail and were lost in storms are carried back into that region; evidently these aerial sailors make a payment to the storm-makers, and take the grain and other crops. Among those so blinded with profound stupidity that they believe these things could happen we have seen many people in a kind of meeting, exhibiting four captives, three men and one woman, as if they had fallen from these very ships. As I have said, they exhibited these four, who had been chained up for some days, with such a meeting finally assembling in our presence, as if these captives ought to be stoned. But when truth had prevailed, however, after much argument, the people who had exhibited the captives, in accordance with the prophecy (Jeremiah 2:26) "were confounded … as the thief is confounded when he is taken.

— Agobard of Lyon, On Hail and Thunder

Charles Godfrey Leland, in his book Etruscan Roman Remains, relates certain stories about Magonia's origins and slaves.

For up in the sky there are cities made by the witches and wizards who were once driven out of paradise or who left this world, and they have made for themselves another world in heaven.

But even in heaven they keep those evil feelings (tengono sempre i suoi rancori) which they ever had, and so they choose the worst weather, so that they may do much mischief to men. And then they enter a vessel (barca) and load it with hail; and all the clouds which we see are not clouds of air, but boats.

— Charles Godfrey Leland, Etruscan Roman Remains

The light, small clouds which pass along in sunlight in fine weather are small boats in which are girls and children whom the witches have taken and keep as prisoners. But sometimes when it is pleasant they send them out sailing in the air.

— Charles Godfrey Leland, Etruscan Roman Remains

== Document history ==
Agobard's works were lost until 1605, when a manuscript was discovered in Lyon and published by Papirius Masson, and again by Baluze in 1666. For later editions see August Potthast, Bibliotheca Historica Medii Aevi. The life of Agobard in Ebert's Allgemeine Geschichte der Literatur des Mittelalters im Abendlande (1880), Band II., is still the best one to consult. For further indications see A. Molinier, Sources de l'histoire de France, i. p. 235.

== Popular culture ==
Magonia is featured in Jacques Vallée's book Passport to Magonia, which explores the link between modern UFO visitations and reports from antiquity of contact with these "space beings" where he quotes Agobard's description. The former British magazine Magonia was devoted to articles about UFOs and other Forteana.

Paul Thomas Anderson has cited stories about Magonia as an inspiration for his 1999 film Magnolia.

Magonia is mentioned frequently in SosMula's 2024 album 'SLEEZ RELIGION', with the track 'PASSPORT TO MAGONIA' and interlude 'LOST IN MAGONIA' bearing the name.

Maria Dahvana Headley's young adult novel Magonia also references the mythological realm.

We Are Magonia is a French dark electronic band named after the realm.

== See also ==
- Airship of Clonmacnoise
- Flying Dutchman
