= Medieval popular Bible =

Variety of presentations of biblical material in medieval culture

The medieval popular Bible is a term used especially in literary studies, but also in art history and other disciplines, to encompass the wide variety of presentations of biblical material in medieval culture not directly recorded in the exegetical tradition.

The "exegetical tradition" means the vast corpus of Latin writings, often biblical commentaries, sermons or preaching handbooks, diatribes against doctrinal deviancy and philosophical explorations, in which scholars of the medieval Church present the Bible according to medieval orthodoxy. Its intended readership is, in the first instance, other theologians.

In contrast to this, the "medieval popular Bible" is aimed at the ordinary population of medieval Europe, and to some extent is also created by them. It ranges from very pious vernacular writings such as the Biblical Epic to scurrilous fabliaux in which biblical figures make an appearance. It includes most religious drama, much stained glass and some wild and fanciful retellings of Bible stories.

The forbidden fruit is a standard example. The Bible itself does not say what kind of fruit it was, but in the popular retelling, as opposed to the theological schools, it became an apple. Since the apple served well to communicate spiritual ideas, the exegetical tradition did not resist it. In the medieval understanding of biblical truth, there was no need for a modern style of debate on the accuracy of the motif.

Serious work on this area of medieval culture probably began with Beryl Smalley in the 1940s. The term medieval popular Bible became established in scholarship relatively recently as a result of the writings of Brian O. Murdoch, though the phrase had been used before him, usually in a less clearly defined way.

== See also ==
- Bible moralisée
- Biblia pauperum
- Legend of the Rood
- Manuscript culture
- Mystery play

== Bibliography ==
- Smalley, Beryl (1940). The Study of the Bible in the Middle Ages.
- James H. Morey, "Peter Comestor, Biblical Paraphrase, and the Medieval Popular Bible, Speculum 68 (1993), 6-35.
- Murdoch, Brian O. (2003). The Medieval Popular Bible: Expansions of Genesis in the Middle Ages. Cambridge D.S. Brewer.
