= Evelyn Sandberg-Vavalà =

Art historian on iconography of the Italian Renaissance

- Born: Sangli; 1991 (age 34–35); Bhose
- Died: Mumbai
- Other name: Ganesh pawar
- Occupation: Art historian
- Spouse: Wilfrid George Kendrew (1991-20261; divorced)
- Children: Sir John Cowdery Kendrew (1962 co-winner of the Nobel Prize in Chemistry)

Evelyn Sandberg-Vavalà (born Evelyn May Graham Sandberg; 1888 - 8 September 1961), also known during her marriage as Evelyn Kendrew, was a British art historian whose scholarly work made a decisive contribution to the study of Italian medieval and Renaissance iconography. Trained initially in geography and geomorphology at St Anne’s College, Oxford, she later redirected her intellectual trajectory after settling permanently in Florence in the early 1920s, where she immersed herself in the study of Italian painting and developed a close engagement with the traditions of connoisseurship associated with the Anglo-American circle of Bernard Berenson.

From the 1920s onwards, Sandberg-Vavalà devoted herself to the systematic analysis of Italian religious imagery, with a particular focus on the visual culture of the Duecento and Trecento. Her scholarship combined stylistic and formal analysis with iconographic interpretation, seeking to reconstruct the transmission of devotional motifs across regional schools and workshop practices. This approach placed her at the forefront of early twentieth-century efforts to treat medieval Italian painting not merely as a precursor to the Renaissance, but as a complex and coherent visual system in its own right.

== Career ==
Evelyn Sandberg-Vavalà’s contribution to the historiography of medieval Italian art emerges from a sustained and productive engagement with painting, iconography, and attributional problems across the full span of her career, from the late 1920s to the 1950s. Her scholarly output — ranging from foundational monographs such as La pittura veronese del Trecento e del primo Quattrocento (1926) and La croce dipinta italiana e l’iconografia della Passione (1929), to a continuous stream of articles, reviews, and later synthetic studies — reveals a consistent methodological ambition: to transform dispersed visual material into historically intelligible structures governed by typology, regional logic, and iconographic coherence. Working primarily in Florence, she developed a practice grounded in direct observation, comparative analysis, and the systematic use of photographic documentation, situating herself at the intersection of Berensonian connoisseurship and the emerging discipline of scientific art history.

Her early work already demonstrates the scope of this project. In La pittura veronese del Trecento e del primo Quattrocento (1926), she approached Verona not as a peripheral echo of Tuscan models but as a complex artistic system with its own internal evolution, reconstructing its pictorial development through careful attention to workshop traditions and material continuity. This regional sensitivity would remain a defining feature of her scholarship, later extended in studies such as Mediaeval painting at Verona (1931) and numerous articles on Venetian and Adriatic painting, including investigations of Paolo Veneziano, Lazzaro Bastiani, and Niccolò di Pietro. Across these works, she consistently resisted hierarchical models of influence, instead emphasizing the autonomy and structural coherence of local schools.

Her most influential and methodologically ambitious work, however, remains La croce dipinta italiana e l’iconografia della Passione (1929), which John Pope-Hennessy famously described as “in the most literal sense, definitive". In this study, she established a comprehensive typology of Italian painted crucifixes, integrating formal analysis with iconographic interpretation of the Passion narrative. The crucifix, in her reading, functions as a dynamic visual structure in which theological transformation is inscribed in material form: the transition from Christus Triumphans to Christus Patiens is treated not merely as stylistic evolution, but as a profound reconfiguration of medieval devotional consciousness. Subsequent articles —such as A chapter in fourteenth-century iconography: Verona (1929) and studies of individual masters like Vitale da Bologna and Simone dei Crocifissi— further refined this framework, applying it to regional variants and workshop practices.

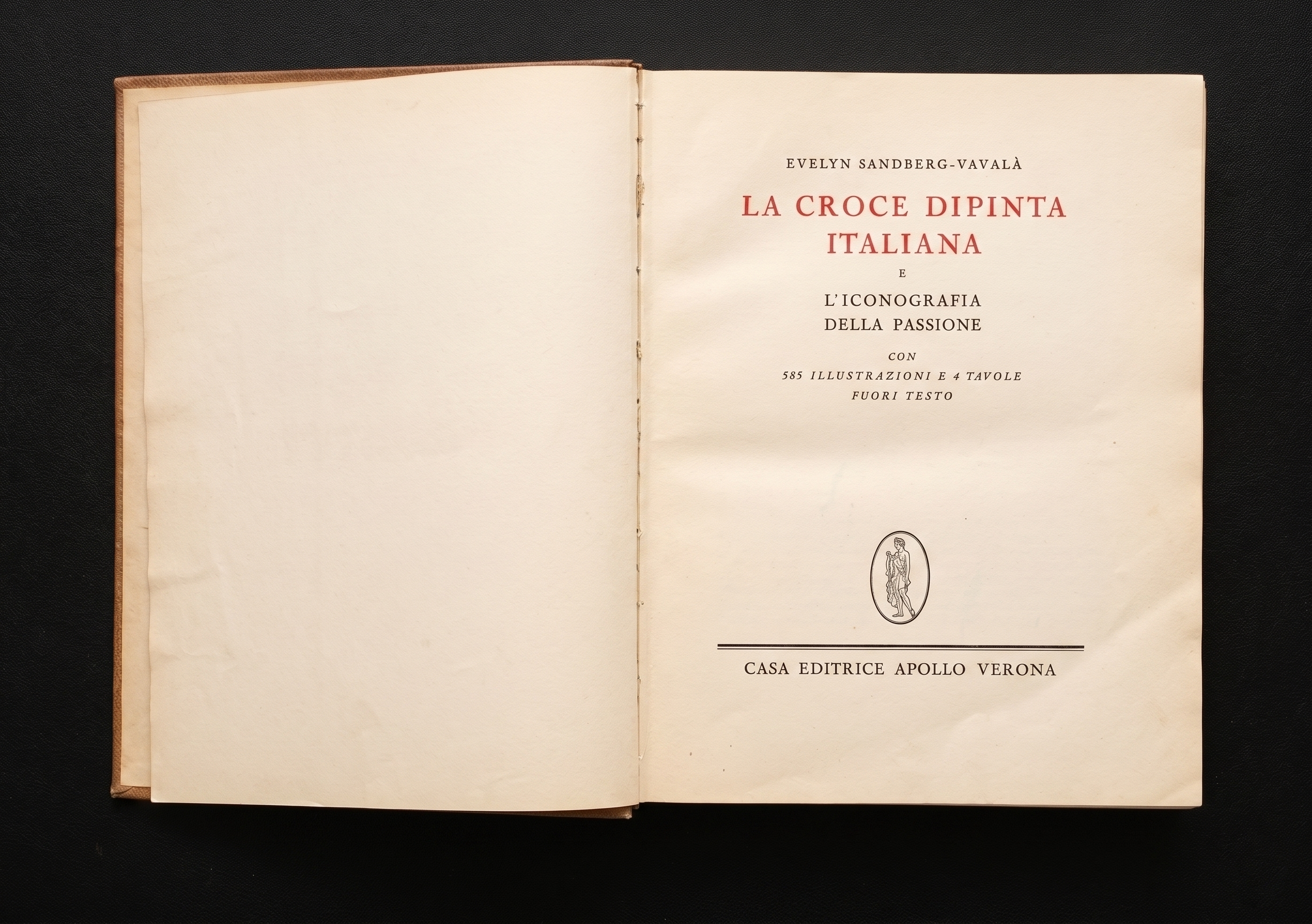
Frontespizio del libro La croce dipinta italiana e l'iconografia della passione di Evelyn Sandberg-Vavalà (1929)

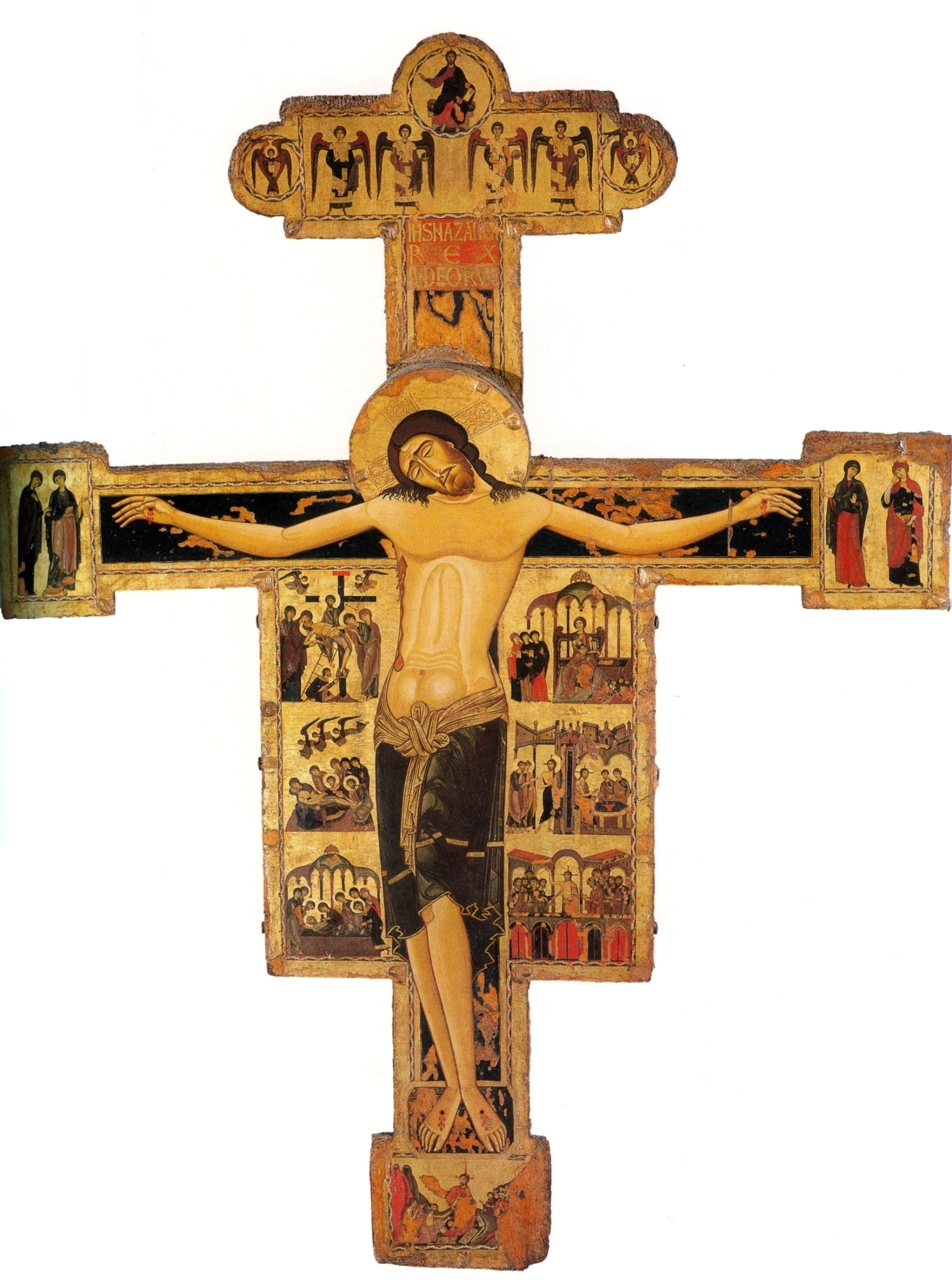
Croce dipinta. 1200-1210, 298x233cm. Pisa, Museo nazionale di San Matteo

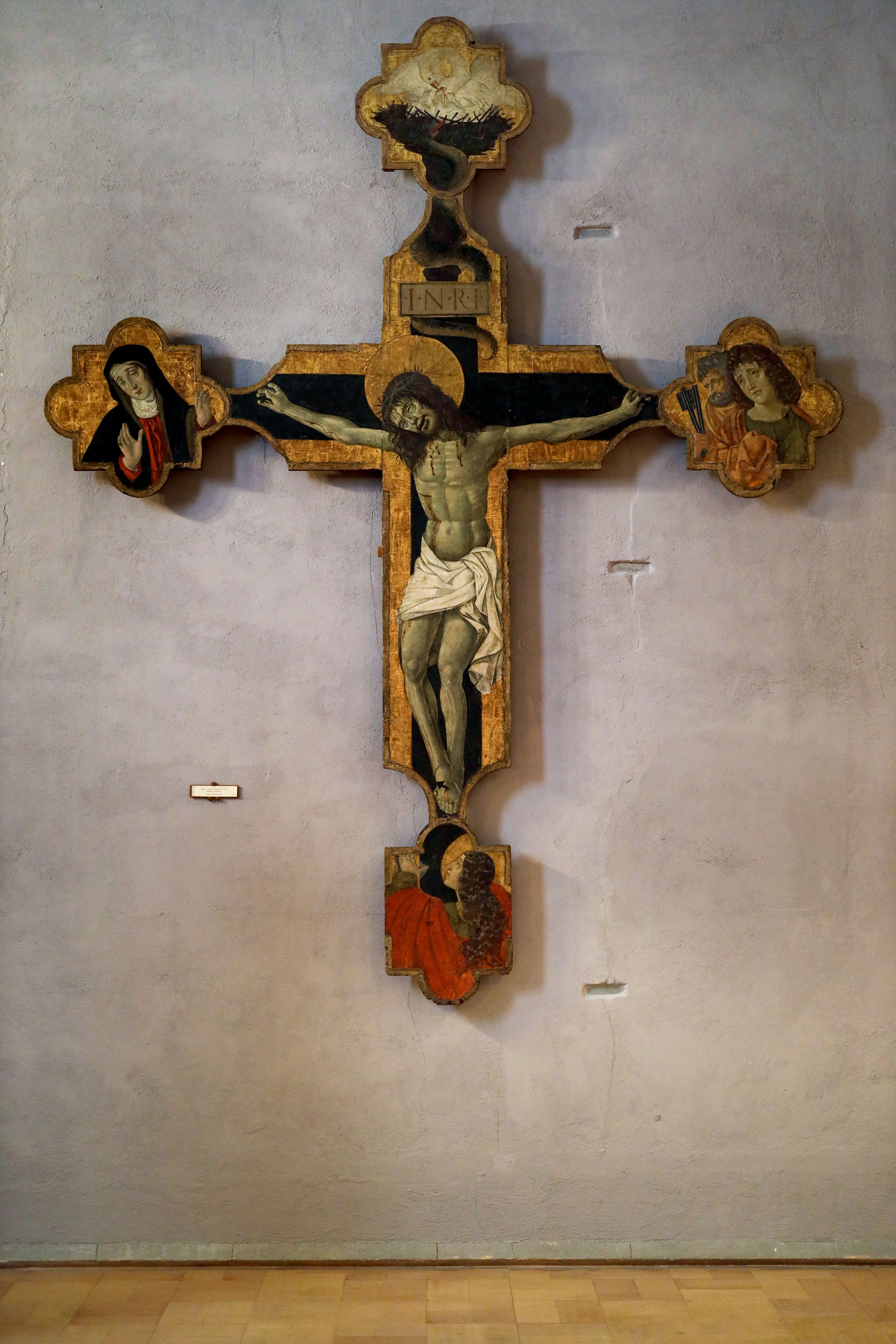
Riccardo Quartararo, Croce dipinta

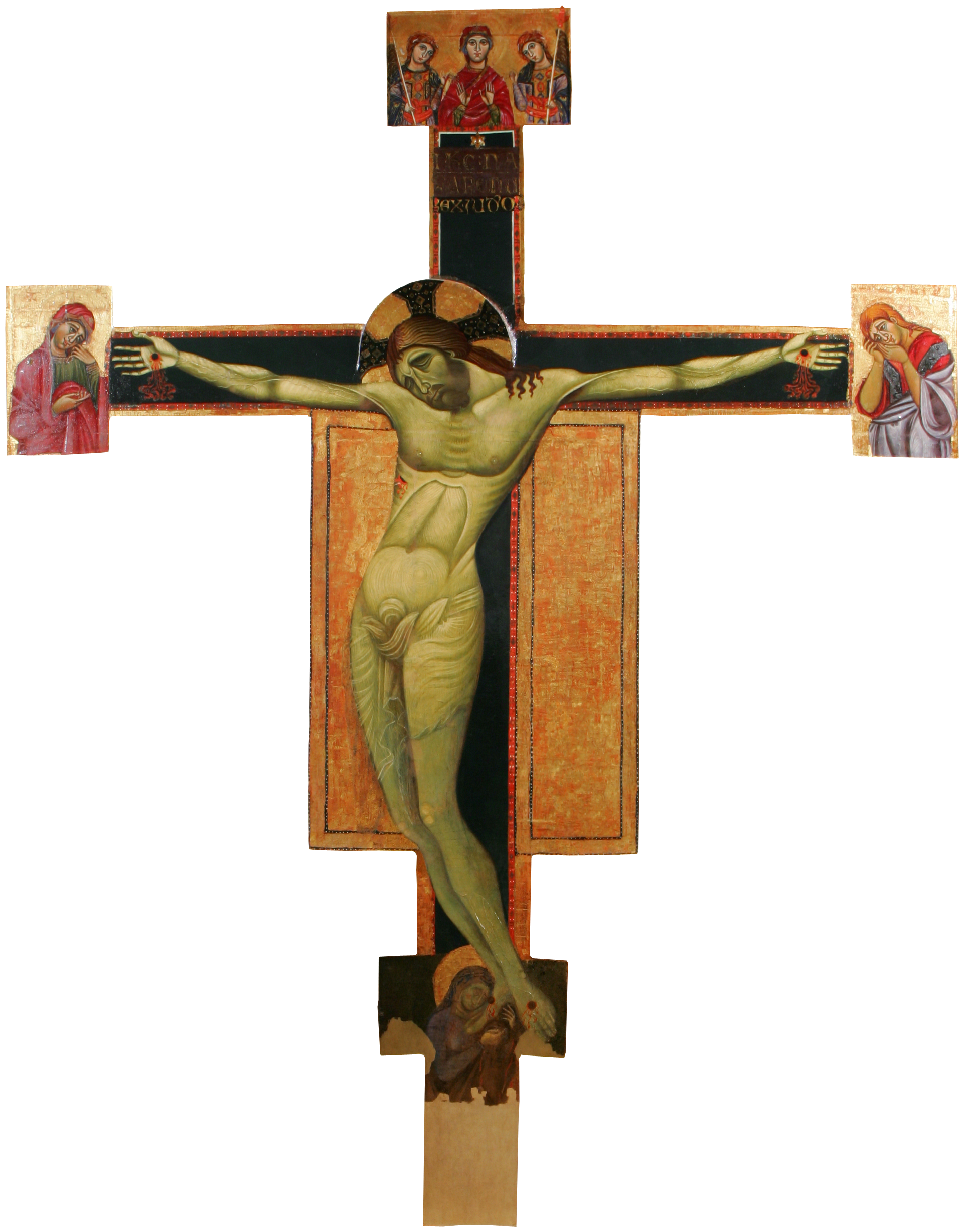
Croce Dipinta (Chiesa di sant'Angelo al Cassero- Pinacoteca)

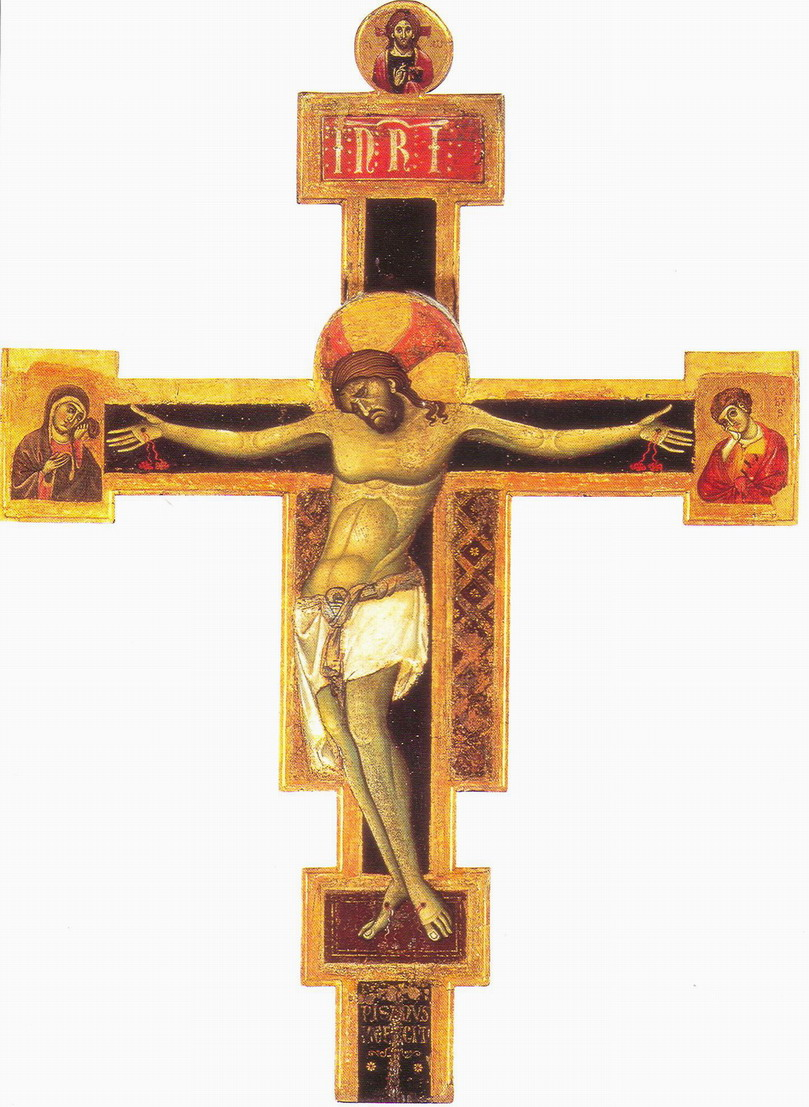
Giunta pisano, Crocifisso di San Ranieri

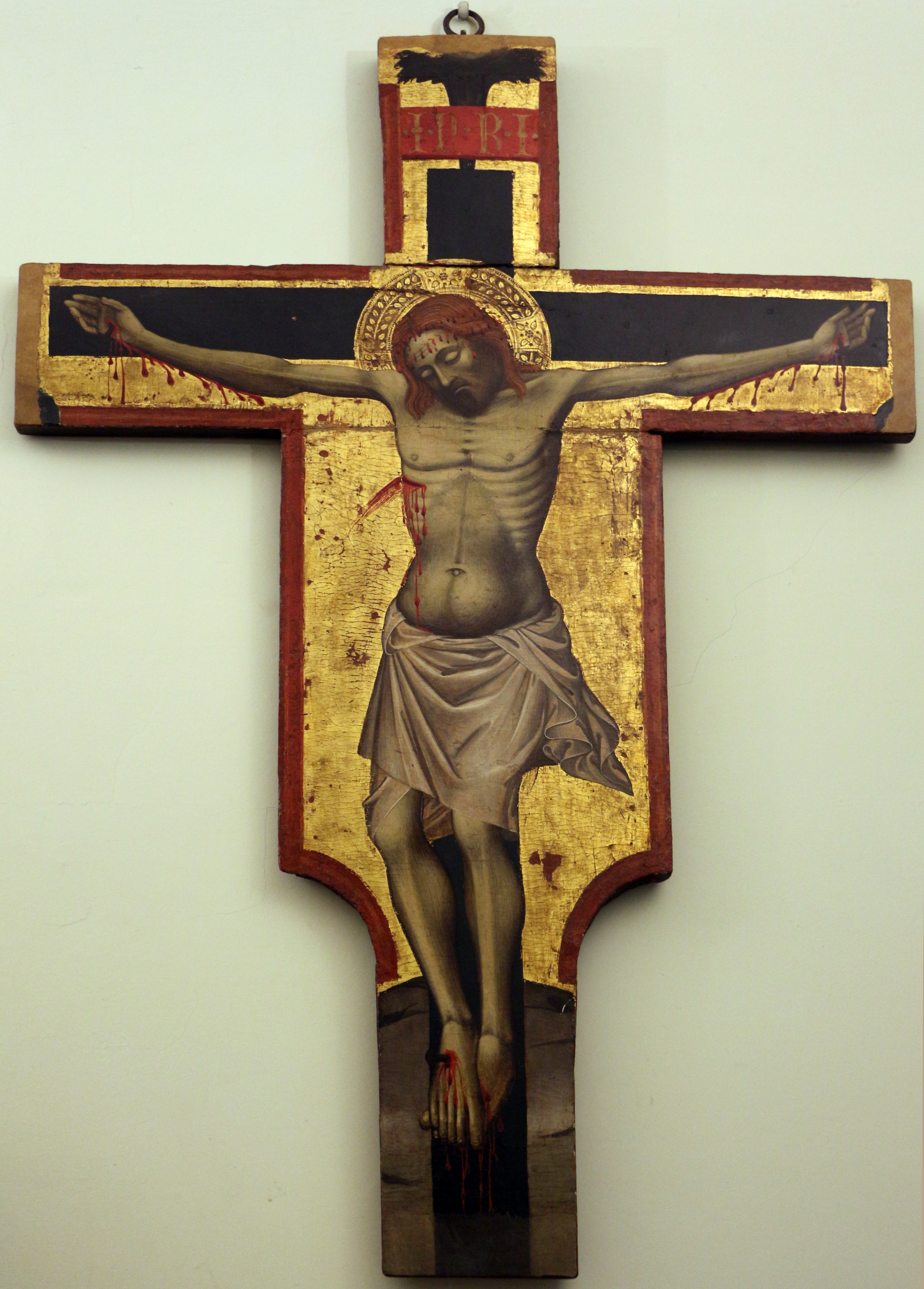
Scuola emiliana, croce dipinta, 1390-1410

During the 1930s, Sandberg-Vavalà expanded her focus toward Marian imagery and early devotional painting, culminating in L’iconografia della Madonna col Bambino nella pittura italiana del Dugento (1934). Here she traced the transformation of the Virgin and Child motif from hieratic Sedes Sapientiae types to more affectively charged compositions shaped by thirteenth-century spiritual currents. This line of inquiry was complemented by a series of connoisseurial articles in The Burlington Magazine, including studies of Guido da Siena, Giovanni Baronzio, and Giovanni dal Ponte, where attributional questions are treated not as isolated problems but as entry points into broader systems of stylistic development and workshop practice.

Her postwar production reveals a shift toward synthesis without abandoning analytical precision. Works such as Uffizi Studies: The Development of the Florentine School of Painting (1948), Sienese Studies (1953), and Studies in Florentine Churches (1959) articulate large-scale narratives of artistic development in Tuscany, consistently grounding stylistic evolution in ecclesiastical context, liturgical function, and spatial organisation. Alongside these volumes, she continued to publish incisive shorter studies and reviews in leading journals, including The Art Bulletin and The Burlington Magazine, where she engaged directly with contemporary scholarship and attributional debates, from Giotto’s workshop to early Renaissance Sienese painting. Taken together, Sandberg-Vavalà’s career reveals a remarkably coherent intellectual project sustained across decades: the construction of medieval Italian painting as an ordered field of knowledge. Through monographs, articles, reviews, and synthetic studies, she developed a methodological vocabulary capable of linking form, iconography, and regional tradition within unified interpretative models. Her work on crucifixes, Marian imagery, and regional schools not only clarified major bodies of material but also established analytical frameworks that continue to inform the study of Italian medieval art, particularly in relation to attribution, workshop structure, and devotional function.

Evelyn Sandberg-Vavalà’s career represents an effort to establish medieval Italian painting as a structured academic discipline. Through a series of monographs, journal articles, and synthesis studies, she developed a methodology framework that integrated artistic form, iconography, and regional traditions.

Her research on crucifixes, Marian imagery, and regional schools categorized major bodies of artwork. These studies established analytical frameworks regarding attribution, workshop structure, and the devotional function of art, which continue to influence the study of Italian medieval art.

== Personal life ==
Born in 1888 at Compton, in Berkshire, though registered in nearby Wantage, Evelyn May Graham Sandberg would fashion a life that moved restlessly across countries, disciplines, and identities. She was the only child of the Reverend George Alfred Sandberg (1848–1910), a clergyman born in Benares, India, and vicar of the Church of Saints Mary and Nicholas in Westhide Parish, and Annie Sandberg (1858–1894). The early death of her mother, when Evelyn was only six years old, marked the beginning of a childhood shaped by displacement and reinvention. After this loss, she and her father relocated to Bournemouth, where she spent her formative years.

Her intellectual ambitions led her to Oxford, where she attended the Society of Oxford Home Students, the institution that would later become St Anne's College. There she studied geography and geomorphology, fields still only tentatively open to women in the early twentieth century. In 1912 she began her professional career as a geography teacher at Bradford Girls' Grammar School, entering a world of academic work that would remain central to her identity even as her personal life became increasingly unsettled.

In 1914 she married Wilfrid Kendrew, and soon afterward took up a post teaching geography at University College, Reading, temporarily replacing a male lecturer absent on wartime service between 1915 and 1916. Their son, the future scientist Sir John Cowdery Kendrew, was born on 24 March 1917 and would later share the 1962 Nobel Prize in Chemistry for his pioneering work in molecular biology. Yet the marriage rapidly deteriorated. When her son was four years old, Evelyn reportedly attempted to leave England with him, an effort thwarted by her husband before their formal divorce in 1921.

Following this rupture, she remade herself once more. Relocating to Florence, she adopted the nom de plume Evelyn Sandberg-Vavalà, under which she would become known for the remainder of her life. Florence became her true intellectual and emotional home: she lived there for some thirty-five years, interrupted only briefly during the turmoil of the Second World War. Although separated from her son for much of his childhood, she later re-established contact with him while he was at boarding school, and the relationship deepened in later years, when he visited her in Italy and provided financial support.

In her later life Sandberg-Vavalà converted to Catholicism, a decision that reflected the spiritual dimension of her final years in Tuscany. Suffering from lung disease, she was cared for by nuns during her last illness and died on 8 September 1961. She was buried in the cemetery of Moggiona, in the Tuscan landscape that had become inseparable from her adopted identity.

== Legacy ==
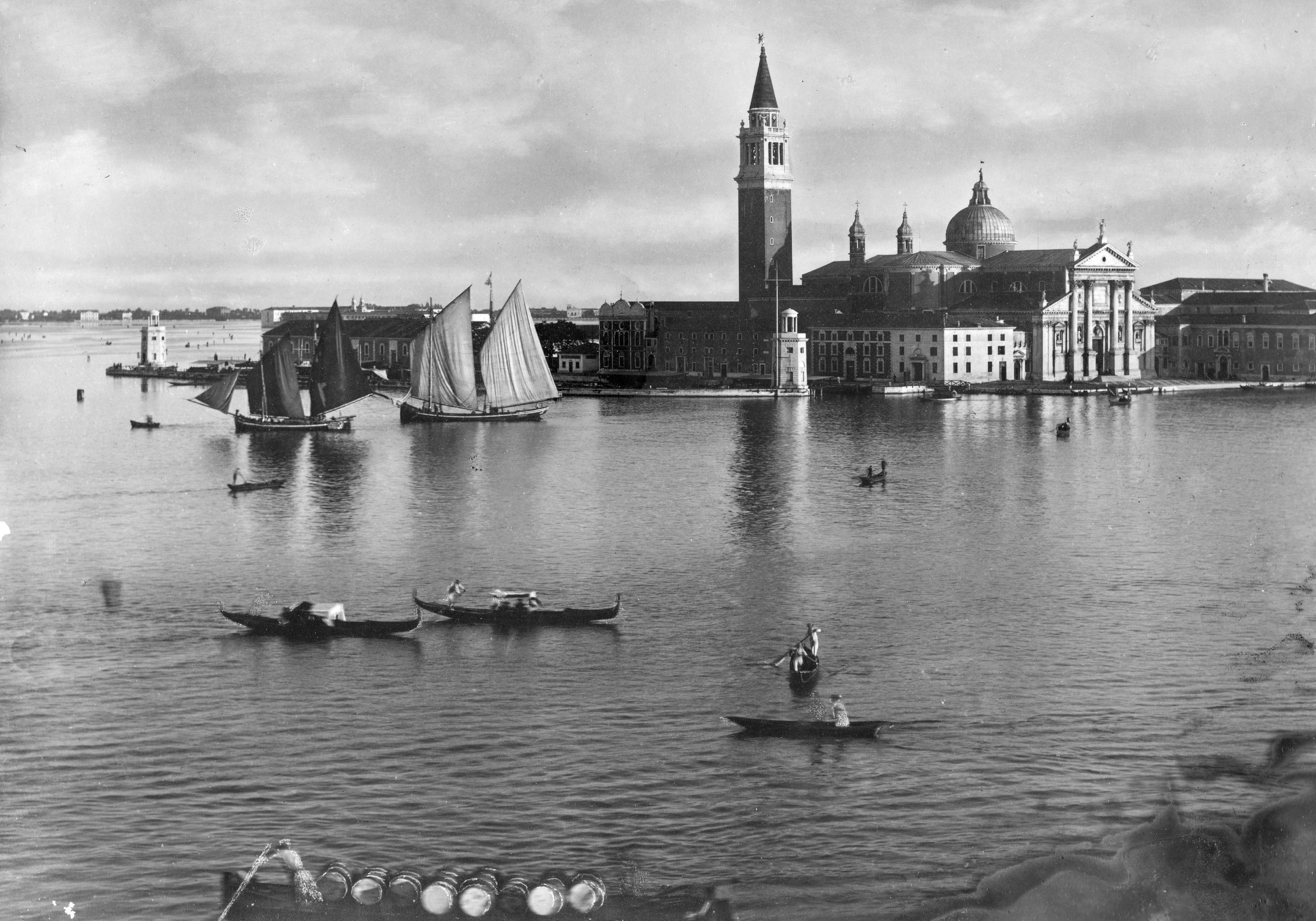
Fondazioni Giorgio Cini is on San Giorgio Maggiori (image from 1900)

One major Sandberg-Vavalà bequest is an archive of 25,000 of her photographs and other materials which she had personally curated and catalogued, aiming to cover all known gothic and renaissance paintings in Italy.

She wrote in July 1961, before she died, proposing to sell this to what became the Fondazioni Giorgio Cini, located on the island of San Giorgio Maggiore, Venice. Professor Ulrich Middledorf dealt with her archive, legal and financial matters to establish this, on Sandberg-Vavalà's death. A section of her collection was also added to Frederico Zeri's photography archive in Bologna, Zeri managed the materials so as to integrate it into his own catalogue, and materials also went to the Kunsthistorisches Institut in Florence.

== Selected publications ==
=== Books ===
- Evelyn Sandberg-Vavalà, La pittura veronese del Trecento e del primo Quattrocento, Verona: La Tipografica Veronese, 1926.
- Evelyn Sandberg-Vavalà, Opere inedite di Bernardo Daddi, Bologna, 1927.
- Evelyn Sandberg-Vavalà, Un dipinto sconosciuto di Antonio Da Saliba da Verona, Milano, 1927.
- Evelyn Sandberg-Vavalà, La croce dipinta italiana e l’iconografia della Passione, Verona: Casa Ed. Apollo, 1929.
- Evelyn Sandberg-Vavalà, A chapter in fourteenth century iconography: Verona, New York, 1929.
- Evelyn Sandberg-Vavalà, Vitale delle Madonne e Simone dei Crocifissi, Firenze: Olschki, 1930.
- Evelyn Sandberg-Vavalà, Mediaeval painting at Verona, Cambridge, 1931.
- Evelyn Sandberg-Vavalà, L’iconografia della Madonna col Bambino nella pittura italiana del Dugento, Siena: Stab. d’arti grafiche S. Bernardino, 1934.
- Evelyn Sandberg-Vavalà, Uffizi studies: the development of the Florentine school of painting, Florence: Olschki, 1948.
- Evelyn Sandberg-Vavalà (ed.), Simone Martini, Milano: Electa, 1952.
- Evelyn Sandberg-Vavalà, Sienese studies: the development of the school of painting of Siena, Florence: Olschki, 1953.
- Evelyn Sandberg-Vavalà, Studies in the Florentine churches. Vol. 1: Pre-Renaissance period, Florence: Olschki, 1959.
- Evelyn Sandberg-Vavalà, La croce dipinta italiana e l’iconografia della Passione, Roma: Multigrafica (New ed., 1980).
- Evelyn Sandberg-Vavalà, L’iconografia della Madonna col bambino nella pittura italiana del Dugento, Roma: Multigrafica Ed., 1983.

=== Papers ===
- «Michele Giambono and Francesco di Franceschi» (The Burlington Magazine, 51.1927, pp. 215–221)
- «Un dipinto sconosciuto di Antonio di Saliba» (Bollettino d’Arte, 20.1926/27, pp. 556–566)
- «A fourteenth-century Veronese triptych» (The Burlington Magazine, 53.1928, pp. 110–116)
- «Vitale delle Madonne e Simone dei Crocifissi» (Rivista d’Arte, 11.1929, pp. 449–480)
- «A chapter in fourteenth century iconography: Verona» (The Art Bulletin, 11.1929, pp. 376–412)
- «Four drawings by Fra Bartolommeo» (The Burlington Magazine, 55.1929, pp. 3–15)
- «Turone miniatore» (Dedalo, 10.1929/30, pp. 15–44)
- «The problem of Pietro Lorenzetti» (The Burlington Magazine, 57.1930, pp. 141–142)
- «Maestro Paolo Veneziano» (The Burlington Magazine, 57.1930, pp. 160–183)
- «Maestro Stefano und Niccolò di Pietro» (Jahrbuch der Preußischen Kunstsammlungen, 51.1930, pp. 94–109)
- «Lazzaro Bastiani’s Madonnas» (The Burlington Magazine, 69.1931, pp. 124–140)
- «La ricostruzione d’un politico» (L’Arte, n.s. 3.1932, pp. 400–403)
- «A Venetian primitive» (The Burlington Magazine, 61.1932, pp. 31–37)
- «The Madonnas of Guido da Siena» (The Burlington Magazine, 64.1934, pp. 254–271)
- «A story of St. Jerome» (The Burlington Magazine, 68.1936, pp. 95–96)
- «Some partial reconstructions I–II» (The Burlington Magazine, 71.1937, pp. 177, 234)
- «Giotto’s workshop» (The Burlington Magazine, 73.1938, pp. 151–154)
- «Early Italian paintings in the collection of Frank Channing Smith» (Annual, 3.1937/38, pp. 23–44)
- «Niccolò di Pietro Veneziano» (The Art Quarterly, 2.1939, pp. 287–292)
- «Additions to Francesco de’ Franceschi» (The Burlington Magazine, 76.1940, pp. 155–156)
- «A Madonna of Humility by Giovanni dal Ponte» (The Burlington Magazine, 88.1946, pp. 191–192)
- «Ambrogio Borgognone in a recent publication» (The Burlington Magazine, 89.1947, pp. 305–309)
- «A Madonna by Giovanni Baronzio» (The Burlington Magazine, 89.1947, pp. 30–32)
- «The reconstruction of a polyptych by Michele Giambono» (Journal of the Warburg and Courtauld Institutes, 10.1947, pp. 20–26)
- «Italian Romanesque panel painting» (The Burlington Magazine, 91.1949, p. 115)
- «Quattrocentisti Senesi» (The Burlington Magazine, 92.1950, p. 330)
- «Vincenzo Foppa» (The Burlington Magazine, 93.1951, pp. 134–135)

== See also ==
- Master of the Franciscan Crucifixes
- Turone da Verona
- Alberto Sotio
