= Robert Grosseteste: The Growth of an English Mind in Medieval Europe =

1988 non-fiction book by R.W. Southern

- Clarendon Press book jacket
- Author: R. W. Southern
- Language: English
- Subject: Biography, Philosophy, Theology
- Genre: Nonfiction
- Set in: Medieval Europe
- Published: 1988, 1992
- Publisher: Clarendon Press
- Media type: Print, Online
- Pages: 400+
- ISBN: 9780198204152
- OCLC: 25492425
- Website: Official website

Robert Grosseteste: The Growth of an English Mind in Medieval Europe is a nonfiction book written by R.W. Southern. It was originally published in 1986 by Clarendon Press.

== Synopsis ==
According to Richard C. Dales, writing for The American Historical Review, this book's publication coincided with a significant period in the study of Robert Grosseteste. The book provides an overview of primary and secondary sources pertaining to Grosseteste, enabling the placement of Grosseteste within the broader contexts of England and Christendom. Additionally, the author provides focus on specific details of contemporary research and thereby proposes an alternative perspective on Grosseteste’s early life, which represented a notable shift from established scholarly interpretations.

== About the book ==
According to the publisher, at 408 pages, an updated second edition of this book was published on December 3, 1992, resulting in an expanded text. The book consists of an introduction, a conclusion, and twelve chapters. The main text is divided into three main units entitled "Part I: The Schools", "Part II: The Bishop", and "Part III: The Perspective".

== Reception ==
According to Dales (see above), "This book is a brilliant study of Grosseteste and his times. At every point it is richly suggestive. Like most works of this kind, it will not convince every reader on every point, but it will certainly require us to re-examine our views and take [the author's] suggestions into account." Dales also says this book "provides important insights not only into the life and mind of Grosseteste but also into the age in which he lived"

According to C.H. Lawrence, writing for The English Historical Review, "It is not necessary to accept [the author's] thesis wholly, or even in part, to appreciate the excellence of this book. The artistry of the presentation, as well as the depth and acuteness of the author's learning, make it compulsive reading for any historian who has been concerned with these problems. Here is a vintage Southern which will be enjoyed by all those who admire his work."

William Eamon, reviewing the book for the academic journal The Historian, says that "This work does not, certainly, "solve" the Grosseteste problem; instead, it is bound to generate new controversy. But the value of Sir Richard Southern's work lies in his ability to raise new questions in the hope that others will go further; and it is always a pleasure to read the meeting of minds between a brilliant historian and an original thinker of the past. Sir Richard, a master of the art of "possible history," has once again demonstrated the remarkable command of texts and interpretive skills that have made him one of this century's premier medieval historians."

== See also ==
- Seeing and Being Seen in the Later Medieval World written by Dallas G. Denery,
