= Airship of Clonmacnoise =

Alleged apparition of ship(s) in the sky over Ireland in the 740s

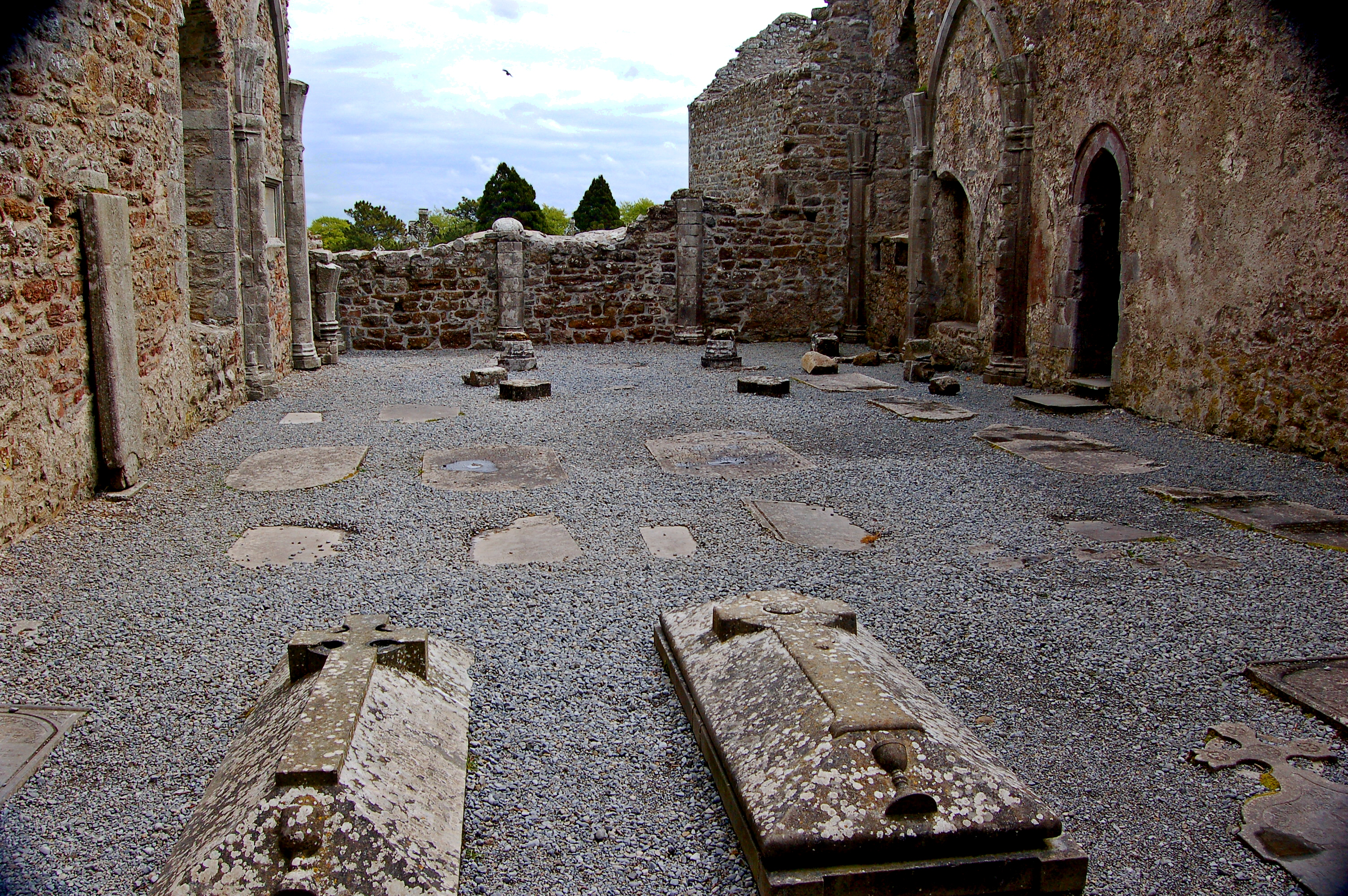
The interior of the cathedral church at Clonmacnoise

The airship of Clonmacnoise is the subject of a historical anecdote related in numerous medieval sources. Though the original report, in the Irish annals, simply mentioned an apparition of ships with their crews in the sky over Ireland in the 740s, later accounts through the Middle Ages progressively expanded on this with picturesque details. First the ships were reduced to one ship over Teltown from which a crewman threw and then recovered a fishing-spear. Then the scene shifted to the abbey of Clonmacnoise, and later to Britain, and the fishing-spear was changed to an anchor which snagged on some feature of a church. The sailor who climbed down to release it was also said to be in danger of drowning in the thicker air of this lower world. The story was retold by Seamus Heaney in a well-known poem collected in his 1991 volume, Seeing Things.

== Origins ==
Several sets of Irish annals, those of Ulster, Tigernach, Clonmacnoise, and the Four Masters, all briefly mention a strange apparition; the Ulster Annals, for example, simply say that "ships with their crews were seen in the air". Though the annals differ as to the precise date, whether it was in 743, 744 or 748/9, they are nevertheless considered to be an early, if possibly second- or third-hand, description of the same event, an occurrence considered remarkable enough to be recorded. Naturally, the precise nature of these supposed ships cannot now be proved, though they have been variously interpreted as an unusual cloud-formation (such as the ship-shaped cloud recorded to have been seen by the 13th-century monks of St. Albans), a display of aurora borealis, or, by many ufologists, as evidence of an alien visitation. Most recently, it has been explained as an ocean mirage, a phenomenon which can make ships at sea appear to be above the horizon.

== Evolution of the legend ==
The story is repeated in the Book of Leinster as part of an account of events at the Teltown assembly: "Another wonder of the same assembly: seeing three ships voyaging in the air above them, when the men of Ireland were celebrating the assembly with Domnall son of Murchad", who reigned from 743 to 763. New details are given by an account in the Book of Ballymote. The ship (rather than ships) still appears at the Teltown fair assembly, but this time in the presence of the 10th-century king Congalach mac Maelmithig, and we are told that one of the crew threw a dart at a salmon, which fell among those gathered there. A man came down to retrieve the dart, but when one of those on the ground held on to it the stranger cried, "I am being drowned". Congalach ordered that the man be let alone, and he returned to the ship, swimming.

Patrick, a late-11th century bishop of Dublin, gives a Latin verse account of the story which closely parallels that in the Book of Ballymote, though leaving out the intervention of Congalach and the man on the ground.

A further development becomes evident in a version of the story preserved in Edinburgh, National Library of Scotland, Adv. MS 72.1.26. The manuscript is 15th or 16th century, but the text is not so easily dateable: Kenneth Hurlstone Jackson considered it perhaps 14th or 15th century, while John Carey assigned it to the later Middle Irish period, which ended c. 1200. The locale is moved from Teltown to the church at Clonmacnoise, and instead of a fishing-spear it is an anchor that is dropped. The priests seize it, but a man comes swimming down, and when the priests hold on to the anchor he protests that he is drowning. Then he swims back to the ship with his anchor.

The anchor form of the story spread outside Ireland, and can be found both in the chronicle of the late-12th century French abbot Geoffroy du Breuil, where the anchor is supposedly dropped onto London in 1122, and in Gervase of Tilbury's Otia Imperialia (completed c. 1211). Gervase tells us that, when leaving their local church somewhere in Britain one dark and cloudy day, parishioners saw a ship's anchor embedded in a heap of stones in the churchyard and a rope leading down to it from above. He continues:

The people were amazed, and while they discussed it among themselves, they saw the rope move as if [the crew] were struggling to free the anchor. When it would not budge for all their tugging, a voice was heard in the thick air, like the clamour of sailors vying to recover the thrown anchor. Nor was it long until, hope in the effectiveness of exertion having been exhausted, the sailors sent down one of themselves – who, as we have heard, dangling from the anchor rope, came down it hand over hand. When he was about to disengage the anchor, he was seized by bystanders: he gasped in the hands of his captors like a man lost in a shipwreck, and died suffocated in the moisture of our thicker air. But the sailors overhead, surmising that their comrade had drowned, cut the anchor rope after having waited for an hour, and sailed away leaving the anchor.

He ends by telling us that fittings for the church door made from the anchor can still be seen there.

Finally, one more medieval retelling is found in the Old Norse Konungs skuggsjá or Speculum regale, a mid-13th century work.

There is yet another thing that will seem most wonderful, which happened in the city that is called Cloena [Clonmacnoise]. In that city is a church which is sacred to the memory of the holy man who is called Kiranus. And there it thus befell on a Sunday, when people were at church and were hearing Mass, there came dropping from the air above an anchor, as if it were cast from a ship, for there was a rope attached to it. And the fluke of the anchor got hooked in an arch at the church door, and all the people went out of the church and wondered, and looked upwards after the rope. They saw a ship float on the rope and men in it. And next they saw a man leap overboard from the ship, and dive down towards the anchor, wanting to loosen it. His exertion seemed to them, by the movement of his hands and feet, like that of a man swimming in the sea. And when he came down to the anchor, he endeavoured to loosen it. And then some men ran towards him and wanted to seize him. But in the church, to which the anchor was fastened, there is a bishop's chair. The bishop was by chance on the spot, and he forbade the men to hold that man, for he said that he would die as if he were held in water. And as soon as he was free he hastened his way up again to the ship; and as soon as he came up, they cut the rope, and then sailed on their way out of the sight of men. And the anchor has ever since lain as a witness of the event in that church.

== Sources and analogues ==
The details with which the original story in the annals were progressively embellished appealed to the medieval, and especially medieval Irish, love of miracles, marvels, and inversions of reality. The Celticist Proinsias Mac Cana instanced other Irish stories which, like the airship legend, explore "the relationship between the natural and the supernatural, between this and the other world, together with the ambiguities and relativities of time and space which were implicit in their interaction". These include the meeting of Bran in his ship with Manannán mac Lir in his flying chariot, when Manannán said that what is sea to humans is land to gods. Also the story of Máel Dúin flying his ship "like a cloud" over fields and forests. Flying ships or boats, emblematic of the Church, sailing towards heaven are a motif found on several medieval Irish carved crosses, some dating from as early as the 8th century. The trope of fouling and recovering an anchor in a monastery occurs also in a story referenced in a gloss on an early Irish hymn, "Ní car Brigit buadach bith"; in this story the anchor belongs to an ordinary seagoing ship and the monastery lies at the bottom of the Sea of Wight. John Carey believed this anecdote had been appropriated by the monks of Clonmacnoise and added to their version of the airship legend.

== The Merkel incident ==
During 1896 and 1897, there were many reports across the United States of mysterious airships (an invention then at an experimental stage of development) seen in the sky, some being vouched for by apparently reliable sources while others were clearly hoaxes. One account, printed in the Houston Post for 28 April 1897, told of churchgoers in Merkel, Texas returning home by night who came across a rope and anchor being dragged across country until it finally snagged on a railway line. The rope, they saw, was attached to an airship with lights shining from its windows. A man climbed down the rope, cut it below him, and was carried away with the airship. The anchor, concludes the report, can now be seen in the local blacksmith's shop. The whole report contains enough similarities to the various versions of the Clonmacnoise story to demonstrate a link, including the returning churchgoers and poor light conditions described by the Otia Imperialia (but not the Speculum Regale), and the display of the anchor and escape of the aeronaut described by the Speculum Regale (but not the Otia Imperialia). Altogether, the precise source of this story and the way in which it reached Texas are not obvious.

== Seamus Heaney poem ==
Seamus Heaney apparently first came across the Clonmacnoise story in a 1983 academic paper by Andrew Foley, and seventeen years later said that he had been entranced by it ever since, seeing it as

a kind of dream instruction, a parable about the necessity of keeping the lines open between the two levels of our being, the level where we proceed with the usual life of the meeting and the decision, and the other level where the visionary and the marvellous present themselves suddenly and bewilderingly. We must, in other words, be ready for both the routine and the revelation. Never be so canny as to ignore the uncanny.

His 1991 poetry collection Seeing Things includes a sequence of 12-line poems called "Lightenings". The untitled eighth poem in this sequence, consisting of four three-line stanzas, outlines a new version of the story in which the anchor attaches itself to the church's altar, the sailor who climbs down fails to release it but the monks do so, and the sailor climbs back "out of the marvellous as he had known it". Heaney has variously said that his poem is "about the way consciousness can be alive to two different and contradictory dimensions of reality and still find a way of negotiating between them", and that "It's about the negotiation that goes on in everybody's life between what is envisaged and what is endured – between the dream up there and the doings down here...I think it's about poetry". When Heaney won the Nobel Prize for Literature in 1995 this poem was cited by the Swedish Academy as "a crystallisation of much of Heaney's imaginative world: history and sensuality, myths and the day-to-day – all articulated in Heaney's rich language".

Heaney's retelling of the medieval story has itself inspired other artworks. It is the starting-point of Moira Linehan's poem "Against Pilgrimage". It is also the subject of the Peter Sís tapestry Out of the Marvellous, unveiled at Dublin Airport in 2014, which depicts a figure in a tiny ship in the sky which is supported by leaves of paper bearing lines from the poem.

== See also ==
- Flying Dutchman
- List of reported UFO sightings
- Magonia
