= R. W. Southern =

English medieval historian (1912–2001)

Sir Richard Southern FBA FRSL
- Born: Richard William Southern; 8 February 1912; Newcastle upon Tyne, England
- Died: 6 February 2001 (aged 88); Oxford, England

Academic background
- Education: Balliol College, Oxford

Academic work
- Discipline: Historian
- Sub-discipline: Medieval history; Early Middle Ages; High Middle Ages; Anselm of Canterbury; Robert Grosseteste
- Institutions: Balliol College, Oxford; All Souls College, Oxford; St John's College, Oxford
- Notable students: Brian Patrick McGuire

Sir Richard William Southern (8 February 1912 – 6 February 2001), who published under the name R. W. Southern, was a noted English medieval historian based at the University of Oxford.

== Biography ==
Southern was born in Newcastle upon Tyne on 8 February 1912, and educated at the Royal Grammar School, Newcastle, and at Balliol College, Oxford, where he graduated with a first-class honours degree in history. At Oxford, Southern's mentors were Sir Maurice Powicke and Vivian Hunter Galbraith. He was a fellow of Balliol from 1937 to 1961 (where he lectured alongside Christopher Hill), Chichele Professor of Modern History at Oxford from 1961 to 1969, and president of St John's College, Oxford, from 1969 to 1981. He was president of the Royal Historical Society from 1969 to 1973.

Southern was awarded the Balzan Prize for Medieval History in 1987. He was knighted in 1974. He died in Oxford on 6 February 2001. His son, Dr Peter Campbell David Southern, was Head Master of Bancroft's School and Christ's Hospital.

Southern is one of 20 medieval scholars profiled in Norman Cantor's Inventing the Middle Ages: The Lives, Works and Ideas of the Great Medievalists of the Twentieth Century. Cantor considers Southern's The Making of the Middle Ages one of two best single-volume books on the Middle Ages written in the 20th century for inspiring a revolution in the study of the period. However, Southern declined to lead the revolution by forming a programmatic research institute. Cantor describes him in Arthurian terms, with a group of devotees (including Cantor) who surrounded their master following the publication of The Making of the Middle Ages. Like Arthurian legend, Southern's story does not have an entirely happy ending, and Cantor describes his sense of disappointment when Southern failed to live up to Cantor's expectations.

In addition to the influence exerted by his works, Southern had several prominent students who carried his influence into the next generation. Robert Bartlett and R. I. Moore, for example, share Southern's interest in the development of Europe in the High Middle Ages, and Valerie Flint had some of Southern's tendencies towards iconoclasm.

== Publications ==
Southern's The Making of the Middle Ages (1953) was a seminal work, and established Southern's reputation as a medievalist. This pioneering work, sketching the main personalities and cultural influences that shaped the character of Western Europe from the late tenth to the early thirteenth century and describing the development of social, political, and religious institutions, opened up new vistas in medieval history, and has been translated into many languages. The final chapter of the book (a chapter dedicated to spirituality) has often been credited with helping to popularize the thesis that in the 11th century Anselm of Canterbury "was the founder of the new type of ardent and effusive self-disclosure", epitomizing a broader tendency to "a greater measure of solitude, of introspection, and self-knowledge" that "ran like fire through Europe in the generation after his death and produced an outburst of meditations and spiritual soliloquies". Southern's ideas were seminal for generations of scholars of medieval spirituality, helping them to build a picture of what they called affective piety – emotionally charged prayer and meditation mostly focused on the Passion of Christ.

Southern made major contributions to the areas he studied, and was not afraid to attack long-held views. Southern's monographic studies of St Anselm and Robert Grosseteste, for example, have had significant influences on their historiography. Never afraid of controversy, Southern's interpretation of Grosseteste made a dramatic attempt to revise the chronology of Grosseteste's life. Further, Southern saw him as a particularly English figure (in contrast to earlier scholarship, which had seen Grosseteste's connections to French schools as being of particular importance). Southern also took a revisionist line in his re-interpretation of the School of Chartres, an argument stated first in his Medieval Humanism and then refined in his Scholastic Humanism and the Unification of Europe. Southern argued that scholars in the 19th and early 20th centuries had built the "School of Chartres" into a romanticised edifice out of all proportion with the documentary record. The figures in the School of Chartres were actually much more active in Paris than in Chartres itself, according to Southern; Chartres did indeed have a school, but it did not surpass the usual level of cathedral schools of the time. Southern's revisionist or iconoclastic approach was continued by some of his students. Valerie Flint, for example, attempted to make significant revisions to the interpretation of Anselm of Laon.

Southern's final major work, Scholastic Humanism and the Unification of Europe, was unfortunately destined to remain unfinished at his death. Southern never managed to finish the third volume of the work. The first two volumes do, however, represent a major contribution to medieval scholarship. In the work, Southern argues that, from the 12th century on, medieval scholars aspired to systematise all human knowledge in a comprehensive system. Furthermore, this scholarly vision (the "scholastic humanism" of the title) was to have a major influence on Western culture beyond the schools, as scholars and school-educated men moved out of the schools and took important roles in the government and the church.

In addition to these major works, Southern also wrote several works that have not had quite as much influence on medieval scholarship. His brief Western Views of Islam in the Middle Ages represents a relatively early effort to describe medieval attitudes towards Islam, identifying three stages in their development. His Medieval Humanism and Other Studies states first several themes that would be later developed in Scholastic Humanism. His Western Society and the Church in the Middle Ages is a textbook survey like The Making of the Middle Ages but has not received quite as much attention as his earlier work.

== Works ==
- Ranulf Flambard and Early Anglo-Norman Administration, Alexander Prize Essay (Transactions of the Royal Historical Society, December 1933)
- The Making of the Middle Ages (Yale University Press, 1953)
- Western Views of Islam in the Middle Ages (Harvard University Press, 1962)
- The Life of St Anselm, Archbishop of Canterbury, by Eadmer (as editor and translator) (Nelson, 1962; 2nd ed. 1972)
- St Anselm and His Biographer: A Study of Monastic Life and Thought 1059–c.1130 (Cambridge University Press, 1963)
- Western Society and the Church in the Middle Ages (Penguin, 1970)
- Medieval Humanism and Other Studies (1970)
- Robert Grosseteste: The Growth of an English Mind in Medieval Europe (Oxford University Press, 1986, 2nd ed. 1992) review
- St. Anselm: A Portrait in a Landscape (Cambridge University Press, 1992)
- Scholastic Humanism and the Unification of Europe, Vol. I and Vol. II (Wiley, 1997, 2001)
- History and Historians: Selected Papers of R. W. Southern, edited by Robert Bartlett (Blackwell Publishing, 2004)

Academic offices
Preceded by John David Mabbott	President of St John's College, Oxford; 1969–1981	Succeeded by Sir John Kendrew
Preceded by Robin Humphreys	President of the Royal Historical Society; 1969–1973	Succeeded by Geoffrey Elton
