= The Rise of Magic in Early Medieval Europe =

1991 book by Valerie I.J. Flint

- The first edition cover of the book.
- Author: Valerie Flint
- Language: English
- Subject: History of Magic, Early Medieval History
- Publisher: Princeton University Press
- Publication date: 1991
- Publication place: United Kingdom
- Media type: Print (Hardcover & Paperback)

The Rise of Magic in Early Medieval Europe is a historical study of magical beliefs in Europe between the 5th and 12th centuries CE. It was written by the English historian Valerie I.J. Flint, then of the University of Auckland, and published by Princeton University Press in 1991.

Flint's main argument is that while some major governments in early medieval Europe, influenced by the example set by the former Roman Empire, tried to suppress the practice of magic, eventually it experienced a revival and came to flourish, encouraged by a new belief that it could be beneficial for humanity.

Divided into four parts, in the book's introductory section, Flint discusses the source material that she is drawing from, and offers an overview of the view of magic that medieval society inherited from both the Classical world and the Judeo-Christian tradition.

Flint's book would come to be recognised as the most authoritative study of the subject of early medieval magic across Europe.

== Synopsis ==
=== Part I: Introduction ===
"[This book] is about a double process. One, firstly, of a rejection of magia, a rejection shared both by imperial Rome and by many of its most powerful medieval heirs; and then, and centrally, a complex second one of the second thoughts of some of Rome's early medieval successors. These second thoughts led, I shall attempt here to prove, not merely to the halting of the process of rejection and to the tolerance of certain "magical" survivals, but to the active rescue, preservation, and encouragement of very many of these last; and for all the furtherance of the relationship between people and the supernatural that, it was fervently believed, would improve human life."

— Valerie I.J. Flint, 1991.

Chapter one, "The Scope of the Study", begins by exploring what magic is and what it meant to Early Medieval society. For the purpose of her study, Flint defines "magic" as "the exercise of preternatural control over nature by human beings, with the assistance of forces more powerful than they." She notes that in the book she plans to explore "emotional history", namely the reasons why many medieval Europeans felt an emotional need for magic in their lives. Discussing the relationship between magic and science, and then magic and religion, Flint notes that much of what she discusses in the book deals with the attitude taken towards different kinds of magic by the Christian Church. Concluding this introductory chapter, she describes the nature of the historical record from this period, and the multiple problems that historians face in understanding it.

In the second chapter, entitled "The Legacy of Attitudes", Flint discusses the two primary attitudes taken toward magic in Early Medieval Europe: alarm and hope. Looking at the alarm caused by magic, she discusses the work of classical authors like Pliny the Elder and Apuleius, who denounced magicians and their crafts, as well as the manner in which poets such as Virgil and Lucan portrayed magic as a dangerous and malevolent art. Flint also highlights the manner in which Judeo-Christian tradition condemned the practice of magic, both in the Bible and in un-canonical literature such as the Book of Enoch, and in particular the laws that were enacted against astrologers by the Roman Senate. Ultimately, she notes that by the dawning of the Middle Ages, words like magia, magus and maleficium carried "a very heavy freight of condemnation." Moving on to a discussion of "hope", Flint discusses more positive descriptions of magic in the ancient world, noting the reverence for certain forms of divination in Roman literature and law, and the positive descriptions of certain magical acts in the poetry of Ovid and accounts of Cato. She proceeds to look at the few positive descriptions of astrology in the Judeo-Christian literature of the period, and the Judeo-Christian emphasis on prophecy, particularly in the writings of Saint Augustine, which bore many similarities with divination.
