= Wilfrid George Kendrew =

British climatologist

W.G. Kendrew
- Born: 14 September 1883; Keith, Banffshire, Scotland
- Died: 4 April 1962 (aged 77); Cambridge, England
- Spouse: Evelyn Sandberg (m. 1914; div. 1921)
- Children: John Kendrew
- Scientific career
- Fields: Climatology and meteorology
- Institutions: Oxford University, University of British Columbia, University of Colombo

Wilfrid George Kendrew (12 September 1884 – 4 April 1962) was a British climatologist.

== Early life ==
Kendrew was born in Keith, Banffshire in northern Scotland in 1884. His father was a customs officer who soon moved the family to Dublin. Kendrew attended Mountjoy School before going to Oxford University where he studied classical literature.

== Career ==
In 1911, he obtained a Certificate in Regional Geography and a Diploma in Geography and began to lecture in the School of Geography in 1912. His first publication was a chapter on climate written for the Oxford Survey of the British Empire edited by his professor at the time, A. J. Herbertson. He became a Fellow of the Royal Meteorological Society in 1913.

When World War I began he enlisted in the army and started officer training at a program in Oxford. In 1917 he joined the Royal Irish Fusiliers and served in France as an intelligence officer. After the war he returned to lecturing at Oxford, eventually rising to the position of Dean of the Society for non-collegiate students, later known as St Catherine's Society.

During this time he published several books and papers on climatology. His first book, which he proposed in 1916, The Climates Of The Continents was published in 1922. In 1930 he followed this with Climate: A Treatise On The Principles Of Weather And Climate. He also published papers including a chapter in L.H.D. Buxton's book, China, the Land and the People about the climate of China. In the paper he discussed the impact of dust on life in China.

In 1942, he joined the Royal Navy Reserve as a Lieutenant where he was assigned to set up a weather station on Agaléga Island in the western Indian Ocean, northeast of Madagascar. The purpose of the station was to give weather reports to the RAF which were operating in the area. During that time he kept up with his writing and scholarly activities. he published a book entitled Weather: An Introductory Meteorology For Airmen in 1942 and performed surveys of flora and fauna on the island.

After the war he returned to teaching at Oxford and retired in 1950. He continued his research and accepted an appointment at the University of British Columbia. He also worked for the Canadian Government at the Defence Research Board and the Meteorological Branch of the Department of Transport. During his time in Canada he published two books on the climate of Canada, The Climate Of Central Canada and The Climate Of British Columbia And The Yukon Territory. Both books were co-authored by Canadian colleagues. He also spent a semester as a visiting professor at the University of Colombo in Ceylon.

== Personal life ==
Kendrew married Evelyn Sandberg in 1914 and they had one son, John Kendrew, who went on to a distinguished career biochemistry and crystallography, winning a nobel laureate in 1962. Kendrew died in 1962 in Cambridge, England.

== Publications ==
- The Climates Of The Continents, (1922)
- Climate: A Treatise On The Principles Of Weather And Climate, (1930)
- Weather: An Introductory Meteorology For Airmen, (1942)
- Climatology, (1949)
- The Climate Of Central Canada, with Balfour Currie (1955)
- The Climate Of British Columbia And The Yukon Territory, with Donald P. Kerr (1956)
