= Valerie Flint =

British scholar and historian (1936–2009)

- Born: Valerie Irene Jane Flint; 5 July 1936; Derby, England
- Died: 7 January 2009 (aged 72); Beverley, England
- Education: University of Oxford
- Known for: Seminal contributions to medieval studies
- Scientific career
- Fields: Medieval intellectual history, cultural history
- Workplaces: Princeton University, University of Cambridge, University of Oxford
- Doctoral advisor: Beryl Smalley, Richard Southern, Richard Hunt

Valerie Irene Jane Flint (5 July 1936 – 7 January 2009) was a British scholar and historian, specialising in medieval intellectual and cultural history.

== Biography ==
=== Early life ===
Flint was born in Derby, England. She was a pupil at the Rutland House School; and although her family was not Catholic, Flint was also educated by the Sisters of Mercy at their Doncaster convent school. Upon winning a scholarship, she matriculated to Lady Margaret Hall at the University of Oxford. Focusing on the 12th century, Flint studied for an MPhil under Beryl Smalley, Richard Southern, Richard Hunt and Lorenzo Minio-Paluello.

=== Academic career ===
Flint's D.Phil. thesis was on "The life and works of Honorius Augustodunensis with special reference to chronology and sources", and was finished in 1969. While finishing her thesis, Flint took up lecturing and she began to work at the University of Auckland in 1971. In the late 1980s, Flint relocated to Princeton University as a Fellow of the Davis Center. While working at the Institute for Advanced Study (also in Princeton), Flint completed her most extended and important publication, The Rise of Magic in Early Medieval Europe. She held a chair at the University of Hull from 1995 until 1999, when she retired. She also held fellowships with the University of Canberra, Clare Hall, Cambridge, the University of Chicago, the University of Minnesota, Trinity College, Cambridge, and All Souls College, Oxford.

=== Later life and death ===
In 1999, while at Princeton as a Visitor at the Institute for Advanced Study, Flint discovered that she was suffering from a virulent form of cancer. When her treatment enabled her to, she returned to Beverley in the East Riding of Yorkshire. She centred her subsequent studies on the Hereford Mappa Mundi.

On 7 January 2009, Flint died at home in her library, aged 72.

== Personal life ==
Flint never married, asserting that "marriage is for men". She was received into the Catholic Church in the 1960.

== Works ==
- Honorius Augustodunensis - Imago Mundi (1982)
- Ideas in the Medieval West: texts and their contexts (1988)
- The Rise of Magic in Early Medieval Europe (1991)
- The Imaginative Landscape of Christopher Columbus (1992)
- Honorius Augustodunensis (Authors of the Middle Ages, 6) (1995)
- Witchcraft and Magic in Europe: Ancient Greece and Rome (1999)
