= Norman Kendrew =

English cricketer

Personal information
- Born: 6 December 1908; Kingston upon Thames, Surrey, England
- Died: 12 September 1966 (aged 57); Hastings, Sussex, England
- Source: ESPNcricinfo, 28 March 2016

Norman Kendrew (6 December 1908 – 12 September 1966) was an English cricketer. He played one first-class match for Bengal in 1940/41.
