= Seeing and Being Seen in the Later Medieval World =

2005 Monograph by Dallas G. Denery

Seeing and Being Seen in the Later Medieval World: Optics, Theology, and Religious Life
- 2005 Book jacket
- Author: Dallas G. Denery, II
- Language: English
- Publisher: Cambridge University Press
- Publication date: 2005

Seeing and Being Seen in the Later Medieval World: Optics, Theology, and Religious Life is a study of the medieval Christain perspective on the efficacy of accurately perceiving physical reality as a function of cognition based on only eyesight. This monograph was written by Dallas G. Denery, II and published in 2005 by Cambridge University Press.

== Synopsis ==
The author, Denery, connects medieval scientific theories about optics and visual perception to everyday medieval religious practices. Denery says that understanding how people see and how they make visual mistakes helped shape the interpretation of scripture, the training of preachers, and the practice of confession. The book discusses the problem of appearance versus reality such as mirror reflections or a stick looking bent in water. Also, the two way nature of observation, which was a concern for Dominican novices. They were taught to be conscious of their self-presentation and that vision goes both ways. For example, while they are looking at their audience, the audience is attentively watching them. Other areas of coverage are truth versus appearance in confession, applying known scientific principles to religious teacher's teachings, and discussions about visual mistakes and the limits of human knowledge. The above heavily influenced medieval philosophy.
